= List of women in statistics =

This is a list of women who have made noteworthy contributions to or achievements in statistics.

== A ==
- Helen Abbey (1915–2001), American biostatistician known for prolific mentorship of students
- Edith Abbott (1876–1957), American economist, social worker, educator, and author
- Sarah Abramowitz (born 1967), American statistics educator and textbook author
- Sophie Achard (born 1977), French statistical neuroscientist
- Atinuke Olusola Adebanji, first female professor of statistics in Ghana
- Dorothy Adkins (1912–1975), psychologist concentrating on psychometrics
- Ana María Aguilera, Spanish expert on principal component analysis, functional data analysis, and categorical data
- Susan Ahmed (born 1946), American biostatistician and educational statistician
- Laura Ahtime, chief executive of the Seychelles National Bureau of Statistics
- Beatrice Aitchison (1908–1997), transportation economist who became the top woman in the United States Postal Service
- Martha Aliaga (1937–2011), Argentine statistics educator and president of the Caucus for Women in Statistics
- Betty Allan (1905–1952), Australian statistician and biometrician, first statistician at CSIRO
- Genevera Allen, American statistician, expert on interpretable learning, reproducibility, and the neuroscience of synesthesia
- I. Elaine Allen, American survey statistician and biostatistician
- Naomi Altman, Canadian–American biostatistician known for her work in kernel methods
- Garnet Anderson, American biostatistician, identified risks of postmenopausal hormone therapy
- Christine Anderson-Cook (born 1966), Canadian expert on design of experiments, reliability, and nuclear forensics
- Mariza de Andrade, Brazilian-American biostatistician known for her work in statistical genetics
- Rebecca Andridge, American expert on imputation of missing data and group-randomized trials
- Svetlana Antonovska (1952-2016), Macedonian sociologist and statistician, founder of contemporary statistics in North Macedonia
- Kellie Archer (born 1969), American biostatistician specializing in microarray analysis techniques
- Margaret Armstrong, Australian geostatistician and textbook author
- Arlene Ash, American statistician who works on risk adjustment in health services
- Jana Asher, American expert in the statistics of human rights and sexual violence
- Deborah Ashby (born 1959), British statistician who specialises in medical statistics and Bayesian statistics
- Susan Assmann (1956–2020), American discrete mathematician and biostatistician
- Marie Auger-Méthé, Canadian statistical ecologist, expert on the movement of polar and marine animals

== B ==
- Julie E. Backer (1890–1977), Norwegian health and population statistician in Norway's Central Bureau of Statistics
- Anita K. Bahn (1920–1980), chief epidemiologist of Maryland
- Barbara A. Bailar, American statistician, president and executive director of the American Statistical Association
- Rosemary A. Bailey (born 1947), British statistician who works in the design of experiments and the analysis of variance
- Joan Bailey-Wilson (born 1953), American statistical geneticist
- Rose Baker, British physicist, mathematician, and statistician
- Huldah Bancroft (died 1966), American biostatistician and expert on tropical diseases
- Karen Bandeen-Roche, American biostatistician known for her research on aging
- Rina Foygel Barber, American statistician who studies graphical models, false discovery rates, and regularization
- Mildred Barnard (1908–2000), Australian biometrician, mathematician and statistician
- Jill S. Barnholtz-Sloan, American biostatistician specializing in brain tumors
- Pauline Barrieu, French financial statistician
- Kaye Basford, Australian statistician and biometrician who applies statistical methods to plant genetics
- Saonli Basu, Indian-American statistical geneticist
- Carmen Batanero, Spanish statistics educator
- Nancy Bates, senior researcher at the United States Census Bureau
- Mary Batcher, American tax statistician, chair of National Institute of Statistical Sciences
- Marijka Batterham, director of National Institute for Applied Statistics Research Australia
- M. J. Bayarri (1956–2014), Spanish Bayesian statistician, president of International Society for Bayesian Analysis
- Betsy Becker, American researcher on meta-analysis and educational psychometrics
- Laurel Beckett, American biostatistician, expert on Alzheimer's disease and other neurodegenerative diseases
- Grace Bediako, former head of Ghana Statistical Service
- Melissa Begg, American population health statistician and academic administrator
- Alexa Beiser, American biostatistician
- Andriëtte Bekker (born 1958), South African mathematical statistician
- Scarlett Bellamy, American biostatistician, expert on interventions in longitudinal behavioural modification trials
- Emma Benn, American biostatistician, performs causal inference on health disparities
- Helen Berg (1932–2010), American feminist economic statistician and mayor of Corvallis, Oregon
- Agnes Berger, Hungarian-American biostatistician
- Elza Berquó (1925–2026), Brazilian demographer
- Lisa Bersales, National Statistician of the Philippines
- Nicky Best, British statistician, expert on Bayesian inference
- Rebecca Betensky, biostatistician at Harvard University and Massachusetts General Hospital
- Julia Bienias, American expert on the biostatistics of Alzheimer's disease
- Ayse Bilgin, Australian statistician and statistics educator, president-elect of International Association for Statistical Education
- Lynne Billard (born 1943), Australian-American AIDS researcher, president of American Statistical Association and International Biometric Society
- Nedret Billor, Turkish statistician, works in robust statistics and outlier detection
- Sheila Bird (born 1952), British biostatistician whose assessment of misuse of statistics led to statistical guidelines for medical journals
- Yvonne Bishop (died 2015), American expert in multivariate analysis who studied anaesthetics and air pollution
- Lenore E. Bixby (died 1994), American statistician who worked with the Social Security Administration and National Academy of Sciences
- Erin Blankenship, American statistics educator
- Carol Joyce Blumberg, American statistician interested in survey methodology, design of experiments, and statistics education
- Eileen Boardman (c. 1942 – 2018), American statistician, applied statistical quality measures to solar power
- Mary Ellen Bock, first female full professor in statistics and first female chair of statistics at Purdue University
- Graciela Boente, Argentine mathematical statistician known for her research in robust statistics
- Małgorzata Bogdan, Polish mathematical statistician
- Jane M. Booker, American statistician, expert in expert elicitation and fuzzy logic
- Connie M. Borror (1966–2016), American statistician and industrial engineer interested in quality control and forensic toxicology
- Jonaki Bose, Indian-American government statistician, expert on survey methodology
- Bertha C. Boschulte (1906–2004), Virgin Islands educator, women's rights activist, statistician and politician
- Claire McKay Bowen, American statistician, expert in data privacy
- Kimiko O. Bowman (1927–2019), Japanese-American statistician, approximated the distribution of maximum likelihood estimators, advocated for people with disabilities
- Veronica Bowman, British military statistician known for her work aggregating COVID-19 predictions
- Barbara Boyes (circa 1932 – 1981), American government survey statistician
- Jelena Bradic, Serbian-American expert on causal inference and robust and high-dimensional statistics
- Dorothy Brady (1903–1977), American professor of economics at the Wharton School
- Amy Braverman, American statistician, analyzes remote sensing data and climate models
- Erica Brittain, American biostatistician, expert on clinical trials and hypothesis testing
- Donna Brogan (born 1939), American statistician who works in mental health statistics and analysis of complex survey data
- Eileen Brooke (1905–1989), British statistician and health policy professional
- Jennifer Brown, New Zealand environmental statistician, president of the New Zealand Statistical Association
- Cavell Brownie, Jamaican-American expert on wildlife statistics and capture-recapture methods
- Laurence Broze (born 1960), Belgian applied mathematician, statistician, and economist
- Babette Brumback, American biostatistician, expert on causal inference
- Antonella Buccianti (born 1960), Italian geostatistician, expert on compositional data
- Caitlin E. Buck (born 1964), British archaeologist and statistician known for her work in radiocarbon dating
- Florentina Bunea (born 1966), Romanian statistician interested in machine learning, empirical processes, and high-dimensional statistics
- Lynne Butler (born 1955), American combinatorialist and mathematical statistician
- Margaret K. Butler (1924–2013), statistician at the Bureau of Labor Statistics, developed software for nuclear simulations
- Cristina Butucea, French statistician known for her work on non-parametric statistics, density estimation, and deconvolution
- Christine Bycroft, New Zealand statistician and demographer

== C ==
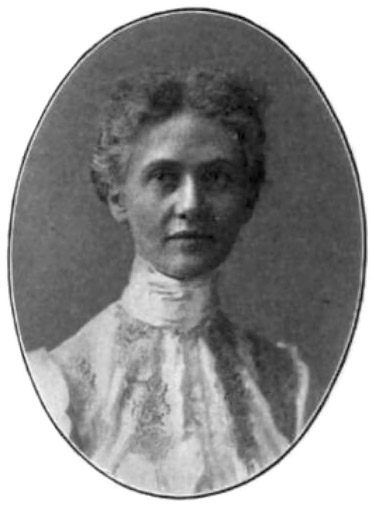
Kate Claghorn became the first female ASA Fellow.

- Jianwen Cai, Chinese-American biostatistician, expert on recurrent event analysis
- Kate Calder, American expert on spatiotemporal Bayesian modeling
- Marion Campbell, Scottish medical statistician and academic administrator
- Violet Cane (1916–2008), British expert on statistics and stochastic processes, first woman professor in University of Manchester Faculty of Science
- Ann R. Cannon, American statistics educator
- Eva Cantoni (born 1970), Swiss robust statistician, president of Swiss Federal Statistics Committee
- Jing Cao, Chinese-American statistician, expert in Bayesian methods, clinical trials, text analysis, and statistics of wine tasting
- Lynda Carlson (born 1943), American government statistician, director of National Center for Science and Engineering Statistics
- Alexandra Carpentier (born 1987), French mathematical statistician and machine learning researcher
- Peggy G. Carr, American expert on educational assessment
- Alicia L. Carriquiry, Uruguayan statistician, applies Bayesian statistics to nutrition, genomics, forensics, and traffic safety
- Mavis B. Carroll (1917–2009), American statistician who pioneered the industrial use of statistics at General Foods
- Carol S. Carson, American economic statistician, director of Bureau of Economic Analysis, director of statistics for International Monetary Fund
- Ann Cartwright (born 1925), explored issues with the use and perception of primary medical care in Britain
- Ana Casís, Panamanian sociologist, statistician, and demographer
- Mine Çetinkaya-Rundel, Turkish statistics educator known for her open source textbooks
- Kathryn Chaloner (1954–2014), expert in Bayesian experimental design, worked on HIV, AIDS, infectious diseases, and women's health
- Beth Chance (born 1968), American statistics educator
- Anne Chao, Taiwanese environmental statistician known for her work on mark and recapture methods
- Enid Charles (1894–1972), British pioneer in demography and population statistics and expert on fertility rates
- Helen C. Chase, president of Statistics Section of American Public Health Association
- Valérie Chavez-Demoulin, Swiss expert on extreme events and risk management
- Cathy Woan-Shu Chen, Taiwanese statistician interested in Bayesian methods and economic statistics
- Jie Chen, Chinese–American professor of biostatistics and epidemiology and expert on change detection
- Jinbo Chen, Chinese-American biostatistician and epidemiologist, expert on two-phase studies
- Debbie Cheng, American biostatistician, researches applied statistics and clinical trial design
- Ming-Yen Cheng, Chinese statistician specializing in nonparametric regression
- Amanda Chetwynd, British combinatorist and spatial statistician
- Francesca Chiaromonte, Italian statistician, expert on statistical genetics and dimensionality reduction
- Christy Chuang-Stein, Taiwanese-American academic and pharmaceutical industry biostatistician
- Marcia Ciol, Brazilian-American expert on comorbidity
- Constance F. Citro (born 1942), American political scientist and statistician, director of the Committee on National Statistics
- Gerda Claeskens, Belgian expert on model selection and model averaging
- Kate Claghorn (1864–1938), American sociologist, economist, statistician, legal scholar, and Progressive Era activist
- Cynthia Clark (born 1942), American government statistician, executive director of Council of Professional Associations on Federal Statistics
- Virginia A. Clark (1928–2018), American biostatistician and statistics textbook author
- Merlise A. Clyde, American statistician known for her work in model averaging for Bayesian statistics
- Clara Collet (1860–1948), British social reformer who collected statistical and descriptive evidence of life for working women and poor people
- Katharine Coman (1857-1915), American historian, economist, sociologist, educator, and social activist, first woman to teach statistics in the US
- Fabienne Comte, French financial statistician, expert on stochastic volatility, autoregressive conditional heteroskedasticity, and deconvolution
- Alanna Connors (1956–2013), Hong Kong-born American astronomer and statistician, introduced Bayesian statistics to high-energy astronomy
- Delores Conway, American statistician, expert on real estate markets
- Dianne Cook, Australian editor of the Journal of Computational and Graphical Statistics
- Cathy A. Cowan, American economist and social scientist
- Gertrude Mary Cox (1900–1978), researcher on experimental design, president of the American Statistical Association
- Stella Cunliffe (1917–2012), British statistician, first female president of the Royal Statistical Society
- Adele Cutler, English-born New Zealand and American statistician who developed archetypal analysis and random forests
- Claudia Czado, German expert on copulas, vines, and their applications in statistical finance
- Veronica Czitrom, Mexican-American statistician, applied statistics to the quality control of semiconductor manufacturing

== D ==
- Dorota Dabrowska, Polish statistician known for her research on counting processes and survival analysis
- Estelle Bee Dagum, Argentine–Canadian–Italian expert in time series and seasonal adjustment
- Angela Dale (born 1945) British statistician known for secondary analysis of government survey data
- Sarah Darby, British epidemiologist and medical statistician
- Nairanjana Dasgupta, Indian statistician, expert on large-scale multiple testing and on the statistics of apple growth
- Susmita Datta, Indian–American biostatistician and Bengali folk musician
- Florence Nightingale David (1909–1993), English statistician, winner of first Elizabeth L. Scott Award
- Marie Davidian, American biostatistician known for her work in longitudinal data analysis and precision medicine
- Beth Dawson, American biostatistician and biostatistics textbook author
- Besse Day (1889–1986), American statistician who pioneered the use of design of experiments in engineering
- Maria De Iorio (born 1972) Italian statistician, uses Bayesian methods in bioinformatics
- Angela Dean, British expert in design of experiments
- Charmaine Dean (born 1958), statistician from Trinidad, president of International Biometric Society and Statistical Society of Canada
- Charlotte Deane (born 1975), statistician and bioinformatics researcher focused on the protein structure of antibodies
- Aurore Delaigle, Australian expert in nonparametric statistics, deconvolution and functional data analysis
- Elizabeth DeLong, American biostatistician interested in outcomes research and comparative effectiveness
- Jill DeMatteis, American statistician specializing in survey methodology
- Lorraine Denby, American statistician and Civil Air Patrol pilot
- Rebecca DerSimonian, American biostatistician, introduced random-effects meta-analysis and its application in clinical trials
- Jill Dever, American survey statistician
- Susan J. Devlin, American statistician, expert on robust statistics and local regression
- María del Pilar Díaz, Argentine statistician
- Marie Diener-West, American statistician, ophthalmologist, and expert on clinical trials
- Paula Diehr, American biostatistician and health systems researcher
- E. Jacquelin Dietz, American statistics educator, founding editor of the Journal of Statistics Education
- Ying Ding, Chinese-American biostatistician, expert on survival analysis, causal inference in precision medicine, and chronic diseases
- Cathryn S. Dippo, American government statistician
- Susanne Ditlevsen, Danish mathematical biologist and biostatistician
- Kim-Anh Do, Australian biostatistician of Vietnamese descent at the University of Texas MD Anderson Cancer Center
- Lori E. Dodd, American biostatistician specializing in clinical trial methodology
- Deborah Donnell, New Zealand and American biostatistician, expert on HIV prevention
- Annette Dobson (born 1945), Australian researcher in biostatistics, epidemiology, longitudinal studies, and social determinants of health
- Rebecca Doerge, American researcher in statistical bioinformatics, known for her research on quantitative traits
- Francesca Dominici, Italian statistician who performs collaborative research on projects that combine big data with health policy and climate change
- Christl Donnelly, uses statistics and biomathematics to study epidemiological patterns of infectious diseases
- Miriam Gasko Donoho, American statistician, expert on binary regression, survival analysis, robust regression, and data visualization
- Sandrine Dudoit, applies statistics to microarray and genetic data, co-founder of Bioconductor project
- Vanja Dukic, American biostatistician who uses internet search patterns to track diseases
- Olive Jean Dunn (1915–2008), American statistician, contributed to the development of confidence intervals in biostatistics
- Karen Dunnell (born 1946), Chief Executive of the UK Office for National Statistics and head of the Government Statistical Service
- Debbie Dupuis, Canadian statistician, applies decision science and robust statistics to statistical finance and environmental statistics
- Josée Dupuis, Canadian and American biostatistician, president of International Genetic Epidemiology Society

== E ==
- Morgan Earp, US government statistician
- Lynn Eberly, American researcher in longitudinal studies, medical imaging, and other forms of correlated data
- Stephanie Eckman, American data scientist, expert on data quality and survey methodology
- Constance van Eeden (1927–2021), Dutch nonparameteric statistician who contributed to the development of statistics in Canada
- Nathalie Eisenbaum, French probability theorist
- Janet D. Elashoff, director of biostatistics for Cedars-Sinai Medical Center
- Ethel M. Elderton (1878–1954), British eugenics researcher
- Marie D. Eldridge (1926–2009), director of statistics and analysis at the National Highway Traffic Safety Administration
- Susan S. Ellenberg, American biostatistician, expert in the design of clinical trials and in the safety of medical devices
- Jane Elliott (born 1966), British sociologist who uses longitudinal methods to explore issues of gender and employment
- Lila Elveback (1915–2004), American biostatistician, founder of American College of Epidemiology
- Kathy Ensor, American statistician who discovered correlations between ozone and heart attacks
- Andreea Erciulescu, Romanian agricultural and survey statistician
- Elena Erosheva, Russian social statistician
- Valentina Escott-Price, Soviet-British biostatistician and genetic epidemiologist
- Sylvia Esterby, Canadian environmental statistician, founder of the International Environmetrics Society
- Alison Etheridge (born 1964), English researcher in theoretical population genetics and mathematical ecology
- Ruth Etzioni, biostatistician, develops statistical computer models of cancer progression

== F ==
- Yingying Fan, American mathematical statistician and data scientist
- Polly Feigl, American biostatistician, expert on survival distributions and cancer clinical trials
- Eleanor Feingold, American statistical geneticist
- Rachel Fewster, British and New Zealand environmental statistician and statistical ecologist
- Krista Fischer, Estonian biostatistician
- Carol Fitz-Gibbon (1938–2017), British expert and activist in education evaluation
- Evelyn Fix (1904–1965), American statistician who invented the nearest neighbor method
- Betty Flehinger (c. 1922 – 2000), American biostatistician, pioneer of computerized medical diagnosis
- Nancy Flournoy (born 1947), American statistician known for the design of adaptive clinical trials and for the graft-versus-tumor effect in bone marrow transplants
- Mary Foulkes (1949–2025), American biostatistician, director of Biostatistics and Epidemiology in the US Food and Drug Administration
- Emily B. Fox, American statistician, expert in Bayesian modeling of time series and in Monte Carlo methods
- Liliana Forzani, Argentine applied mathematician and statistician, expert in dimensionality reduction
- Carolina Franco, American statistician, expert in complex surveys and small area estimation
- Christine A. Franklin, American statistics educator
- Laura J. Freeman, American statistician and reliability engineer
- Birgitte Freiesleben de Blasio, Norwegian biostatistician and epidemiologist
- Sylvia Frühwirth-Schnatter (born 1959), Austrian statistician working in Bayesian inference, president of International Society for Bayesian Analysis
- Rongwei Fu, biostatistician who uses meta-analysis to understand disease patterns
- Montserrat Fuentes, Spanish statistician who applies spatial analysis to atmospheric science
- Cathy Furlong, American statistician active in volunteer work for statistical organizations, president of Statistics Without Borders

== G ==
- Linda Gage, California state demographer
- Margaret Gamalo, Filipino-American biostatistician and drug development executive
- Nina Gantert, Swiss and German probability theorist
- Nancy L. Garcia, Brazilian spatial statistician
- Tanya P. Garcia, Peruvian-American biostatistician, applies robust statistics to Huntington's disease
- Martha M. Gardner, American statistician associated with GE Global Research
- Joan Garfield, American educational psychologist specializing in statistics education
- Élisabeth Gassiat (born 1961), French mathematical statistician
- Ursula Gather (born 1953), German robust statistician, rector of TU Dortmund
- Geneviève Gauthier (born 1967), Canadian financial mathematician, statistician, and decision scientist
- Sara van de Geer (born 1958), Dutch statistician, president of the Bernoulli Society
- Hilda Geiringer (1893–1973), Austrian researcher on Fourier series, statistics, probability, and plasticity, refugee from Nazi Germany
- Yulia Gel, American expert in the nonparametric statistics of spatiotemporal data
- Nancy Geller (born 1944), director of biostatistics research at the National Heart, Lung, and Blood Institute
- Maria-Pia Geppert (1907–1997), German mathematician and biostatistician who founded the Biometrical Journal
- Misrak Gezmu, Ethiopian-American biostatistician
- Nadia Ghazzali (born 1961), Moroccan-Canadian expert on numbers of clusters and university president
- Bonnie Ghosh-Dastidar, Indian-American public policy statistician, president of American Statistical Association
- Jean D. Gibbons (born 1938), American expert in nonparametric statistics and a prolific author of books on statistics
- Alison Gibbs, Canadian statistics educator
- Irène Gijbels, Belgian mathematical statistician and expert in nonparametric statistics
- María Ángeles Gil (born 1953), Spanish fuzzy statistician
- Ethel Gilbert, American expert in the risks of radiation-induced cancer
- Krista Gile, American expert on respondent-driven sampling and exponential random graph models
- Dorothy M. Gilford (1919–2014), head of mathematical statistics at the Office of Naval Research and of the National Center for Education Statistics
- Ingrid Kristine Glad (born 1965), Norwegian statistician, expert in non-parametric regression, microarray data, and image processing
- Beth Gladen, American statistician known for children's environmental health and prevalence estimation
- Amanda L. Golbeck, American biostatistician and academic administrator
- Judith Goldberg, American biostatistician, founder of NYU biostatistics division
- Lisa Goldberg, American mathematical finance scholar and statistician
- Rebecca Goldin, American director of the Statistical Assessment Service
- Christina Goldschmidt, British probability theorist
- Graciela González Farías, Mexican statistician, expert on shape parameters of skewed data
- María Elena González Mederos (1932–1996), Cuban-American government statistician, poetry translator, and human rights activist
- Melody Goodman, American biostatistician interested in social risk factors, health literacy, and stakeholder engagement
- Nancy Gordon, American economist and statistician, president of Caucus for Women in Statistics
- Malka Gorfine (born 1967), Israeli statistician, expert in survival analysis
- Carol A. Gotway Crawford, American expert in biostatistics, spatial analysis, environmental statistics, and public health
- Selma Fine Goldsmith (1912–1962), American economic statistician who estimated personal income distribution
- Patricia Grambsch, American biostatistician, expert on proportional hazards models
- Mary W. Gray (born 1938), author in applied statistics and founding president of the Association for Women in Mathematics
- Jennifer L. Green, American scholar of statistics education
- Celia Greenwood, Canadian biostatistician and statistical geneticist
- Cindy Greenwood, Canadian statistician, winner of Krieger–Nelson Prize
- Beth Ann Griffin, American expert on causal inference in public health statistics
- Deborah H. Griffin, American census statistician
- Clare Griffiths, British expert in mortality statistics
- Emily H. Griffith, American spatial statistician and statistics educator
- Ulrike Grömping, German expert on regression analysis with variable importance
- Montserrat Guillén (born 1964), Spanish expert in actuarial statistics, fraud detection, and kernel density estimation
- Marcia Gumpertz, American agricultural statistician, uses statistics to study employment of women and minorities in STEM
- Ying Guo, Chinese-American biostatistician and neuroimaging researcher
- Margaret Gurney (1908–2002), American mathematician, survey statistician, and pioneering computer programmer

== H ==
- Margaret Jarman Hagood (1907–1963), president of the Population Association of America
- Marjorie Hahn, American probability theorist and tennis player
- Linda M. Haines, English and South African expert in the design of experiments
- Susan Halabi, American biostatistician known for her research on prostate cancer
- Betz Halloran, biostatistician who studies causal inference and the biostatistics of infectious diseases
- Katherine Halvorsen, American statistician and statistics educator
- Ellen Hamaker (born 1974), Dutch-American psychologist and statistician, analyzes longitudinal data in psychology
- Dorit Hammerling, Austrian-American environmental statistician and engineer, expert on greenhouse gas emissions
- Asta Hampe, German engineer and statistician and first German member of the Women's Engineering Society
- Bronwyn Harch, Australian environmental statistician, applies mathematical sciences to agriculture, environment, health, manufacturing and energy
- Alison Harcourt, Australian mathematician and statistician known for branch and bound algorithms and quantification of poverty in Australia
- Jo Hardin, American statistician who develops high-throughput methods for human genome data
- Rachel M. Harter, American expert on small area estimation and survey methodology
- Dominique Haughton, French-American statistician specializing in business analytics, standards of living, and music analytics
- Lee-Ann C. Hayek, chief mathematical statistician at the National Museum of Natural History
- Martha S. Hearron (1943–2014), American statistician, helped found and later headed the Biopharmaceutical Section of the American Statistical Association
- Nancy E. Heckman, Canadian statistician interested in nonparametric regression, smoothing, functional data analysis, and applications in evolutionary biology
- Inge Henningsen (born 1941), Danish statistician and feminist
- Amy H. Herring, American biostatistician and public health researcher working on methods for correlated data
- Vicki Hertzberg, American biostatistician and public health researcher
- Agnes M. Herzberg (1938–2026), first female president of the Statistical Society of Canada
- Irene Hess, American expert on survey methodology for scientific surveys
- Stephanie Hicks, American biostatistician, data scientist, and open source genomics software developer
- Jennifer Hill, American statistician, applies causal inference to social statistics
- MaryAnn Hill, American statistical software developer
- Rachel Hilliam, British statistician, founding chair of Alliance for Data Science Professionals
- Susan Hinkins, American government and survey statistician, expert on human rights
- Marthana Hjortland (1929–2025), American dietician and biostatistician
- Ho Weang Kee, Malaysian statistical geneticist
- Jennifer A. Hoeting, American statistician known for her work on Bayesian model averaging
- Heike Hofmann (born 1972), researcher on interactive data visualization
- Susan P. Holmes, American statistician who applies nonparametric multivariate statistics, bootstrapping methods, and data visualization to biology
- Virginia Thompson Holran, American expert on the statistics of life insurance
- Susan Horn, American biostatistician, developed models for in-practice use by clinicians
- Carol House, American government statistician specializing in agricultural statistics
- Jeanine Houwing-Duistermaat, Dutch biostatistician and genetic epidemiologist
- Chao Agnes Hsiung, Taiwanese biostatistician, president of International Chinese Statistical Association
- Joan Hu, Chinese–Canadian statistician, researcher on pseudolikelihood, estimating functions, missing data, and applications
- Chiung-Yu Huang, Taiwanese-American biostatistician focusing on vaccine efficacy
- Rebecca Hubbard, American biostatistician, studies electronic health record data
- Haiyan Huang, Chinese-American biostatistician, expert on human genome and on reproducibility
- Li-Shan Huang, Taiwanese biostatistician
- Mia Hubert, Belgian robust statistician
- Jacqueline Hughes-Oliver, Jamaican–born American statistician known for her research in drug discovery and chemometrics
- Ying Hung, Taiwanese-American expert in the statistics of computer experiments
- Sharon Hutchinson, British researcher on the epidemiology of blood-borne viruses
- Shelley Hurwitz, American biostatistician and expert in ethics for statisticians
- Marie Hušková (born 1942), Czech mathematician who worked in theoretical statistics and change-point problems
- Jane Hutton, British medical statistician
- Aparna V. Huzurbazar, American statistician who uses graphical models to understand time-to-event data, sister of Snehalata
- Snehalata V. Huzurbazar, American statistician, known for her work in statistical genetics and statistical geology, sister of Aparna
- Shih-Jen Hwang, Taiwanese-American biostatistician and epidemiologist
- Wei-Ting Hwang, Taiwanese biostatistician

== I ==
- Pilar Ibarrola (born 1944), Spanish statistician and stochastic control theorist
- Lurdes Inoue, Japanese–Brazilian specialist in Bayesian inference
- Telba Irony, Brazilian–American statistician, operations researcher, and proponent of Bayesian statistics at the Food and Drug Administration
- Kathi Irvine, American ecological statistician
- Valerie Isham (born 1947), British applied probabilist, president of Royal Statistical Society
- Anastasia Ivanova, biostatistician focusing on clinical trials
- Julie Ivy, American health care statistician, applies systems engineering to health care and to food bank distribution

== J ==
- Eva E. Jacobs (died 2015), edited Handbook of U.S. Labor Statistics and headed the U.S. Bureau of Labor Statistics Division of Consumer Expenditure Surveys
- Linda A. Jacobsen, American demographer
- Monica C. Jackson, American statistician and academic administrator, applies spatial statistics to disease monitoring
- Janis Johnston (born 1957), American statistician and sociologist, author of several books on permutation tests in statistics
- Laura Lee Johnson, American government biostatistician
- Mikyoung Jun, Korean-American spatial and environmental statistician
- Jana Jurečková (born 1940), Czech expert in nonparametric and robust statistics
- Ana Justel, Spanish statistician and Antarctic scientist

== K ==
- Karen Kafadar, American statistician, president of American Statistical Association
- Shirley Kallek (1926–1983), American economic statistician at the Bureau of the Census
- Lulu Kang, Chinese-American interdisciplinary data scientist
- Haya Kaspi (born 1948), Israeli probability theorist
- Tena Katsaounis, Greek-American statistician, president of Caucus for Women in Statistics
- Emilie Kaufmann (born 1987), French statistician and computer scientist, expert on machine learning and multi-armed bandits
- Amarjot Kaur, Indian statistician, president of International Indian Statistical Association
- Katerina Kechris, American biostatistician, uses omics data to study relations between genetics and disease
- Nataša Kejžar, Slovenian Olympic swimmer and network scientist
- Sündüz Keleş, Turkish statistician specializing in statistical methods in genomics
- Sallie Ann Keller (born 1956), American statistician, president of American Statistical Association
- Elizabeth J. Kelly, American statistician, applies statistics to environmental remediation and plutonium disposal
- Gabrielle Kelly, Irish statistician, president of Irish Statistical Association
- Sheryl F. Kelsey (born 1945), first female statistics PhD at Carnegie Mellon University, made significant contributions to heart disease treatment
- Adrienne W. Kemp (1930–2022), British expert on discrete distributions
- Christina Kendziorski, American biostatistician, analyzes high-throughput genetic sequencing data
- Ingrid C. Kildegaard (died 1984), American advertising statistician and market researcher
- Dong-Yun Kim, biostatistician, president of Caucus for Women in Statistics
- Hyune-Ju Kim, Korean-American expert in change-point detection and segmented regression
- Mimi Kim, American statistician in epidemiology, population health, and biostatistics
- Eileen King (born 1954), American biostatistician specializing in the design and analysis of clinical trials
- Ruth King, British expert on the Bayesian analysis of population size
- Charlotte Kipling (1919–1992), English statistician, ichthyologist, and cryptographer
- Nancy Kirkendall, American government statistician
- Grace E. Kissling, chief statistician for the National Toxicology Program
- Claudia Klüppelberg, German mathematical statistician and applied probability theorist, known for risk assessment and statistical finance
- Inge Koch, Australian statistician, author and advocate for gender diversity in mathematics
- Daphne Koller (born 1968), Israeli–American author of text and online course on probabilistic graphical models, 2004 MacArthur Fellow
- Olga Korosteleva, Russian-American statistician and author of statistics books
- Hildegarde Kneeland (1889–1994), American home economist, social statistician, and expert on time-use research
- Mariana Kotzeva (born 1967), Bulgarian statistician and econometrician, head of National Statistical Institute of Bulgaria and of Eurostat
- Mary Grace Kovar (1926–2015), American biostatistician at the National Center for Health Statistics
- Helena Chmura Kraemer, American biostatistician
- Marlene Kretschmer, German statistician and climatologist, applies causal inference to climate change
- Frauke Kreuter, German researcher on in survey methodology, sampling error, and observational error
- Tatyana Krivobokova, Kazakh statistician, expert on spline smoothing
- Shonda Kuiper, American statistics educator
- Lynn Kuo (born 1949), American statistician known for her work on Bayesian inference in phylogeny
- Ana Kupresanin, Croatian-American statistician, head of scientific data at Lawrence Berkeley National Laboratory
- Bärbel-Maria Kurth (born 1954), German statistician and epidemiologist
- Mary Kwasny, American biostatistician

== L ==
- Nan Laird (born 1943), American biostatistician, discoverer of the EM algorithm
- Helen Humes Lamale (1912–1998), American labor statistician
- Diane Lambert, American statistician known for zero-inflated models
- Kathleen Lamborn, American biostatistician known for her highly cited publications on glioma
- Mary Beth Landrum, British-American statistician specializing in health services and the quality of health care
- Julia Lane, New Zealand, British, and American economist and economic statistician
- Jodi Lapidus, American biostatistician interested in Native American health and injury prevention
- Lisa Morrissey LaVange, American biostatistician, president of American Statistical Association
- Nicole Lazar (born 1966), American–Canadian–Israeli researcher on empirical likelihood and functional neuroimaging
- Kim-Anh Lê Cao, French and Australian statistician and computational biologist
- Alice Lee (1858–1939), British researcher on biometrics
- Elisa T. Lee, Chinese-American statistician who directs the Center for American Indian Health Research
- Hollylynne Lee, American mathematics and statistics educator
- Ji-Hyun Lee, American expert on clinical trials for cancer, president of Caucus for Women in Statistics
- Mei-Ling Ting Lee, Taiwanese-American biostatistician known for her research on microarrays
- Yoonkyung Lee, Korean–American expert on multicategory support vector machines
- Julie Legler, American biostatistician, statistics educator, and interdisciplinary undergraduate educator
- Virginia Lesser, American researcher on non-sampling error, survey methodology, and agricultural applications of statistics
- Judith T. Lessler, American expert on survey methodology and organic farmer
- Sue Leurgans, American expert on the biostatistics of human body movement
- Elizaveta Levina, Russian–American mathematical statistician known for her work in high-dimensional statistics and covariance estimation
- Bo Li, Chinese-American geostatistician and paleoclimatologist
- Fan Li, Chinese-American biostatistician, applies causal inference to comparative effectiveness
- Jingyi Jessica Li, Chinese-American biostatistician, integrates statistics with genomics and transcriptomics
- Mingyao Li, Chinese-American biostatistician and statistical geneticist
- Denise Lievesley, British director of Statistics at UNESCO, founder of the Institute for Statistics, and director of the UK Data Archive
- Huazhen Lin, Chinese statistician, expert on survival analysis and nonparametric statistics
- Shili Lin, American statistician who studies applications of statistics to genomic data
- Xihong Lin, Chinese statistician known for contributions to mixed models, non- and semi-parametric regression, and statistical genetics
- Benmei Liu, Chinese-American survey statistician, president of Washington Statistical Society
- Fang Liu, Chinese-American expert on statistical machine learning and data privacy
- Ivy Liu, Taiwanese and New Zealand statistician specializing in categorical and ordinal data
- Regina Liu, American statistician, invented simplicial depth
- Lisa Lix (born 1966), Canadian health scientist and biostatistician
- Greta M. Ljung (born 1941), Finnish–American statistician, namesake of Ljung–Box test for time series data
- Patti Frazer Lock (born 1953), American mathematics and statistics educator and textbook author
- Jane Loevinger (1918–2008), American psychologist and psychometrician, originator of Loevinger's H coefficient
- Regina Loewenstein (1916–1999), American public health statistician
- Po-Ling Loh (born 1987), American high-dimensional statistician
- Sharon Lohr, American statistician, applies survey sampling and design of experiments to education and criminology
- Wendy Lou, Canadian biostatistician, expert on runs and patterns in sequences
- Isobel Loutit (1909–2009), one of the earliest female professional statisticians in Canada
- Wilhelmina Luten (1906–1986), American government statistician

== M ==
- Shujie Ma, Chinese-American expert in nonparametric and semiparametric regression
- Yanyuan Ma, Chinese-American expert in semiparametric statistics and dimension reduction
- Marloes Maathuis (born 1978), Dutch statistician, researcher on causal inference
- Eleanor Josephine Macdonald (1906–2007), American cancer epidemiologist who established the first cancer registry in the US
- Brenda MacGibbon, Canadian mathematician, statistician, and decision scientist
- Helen MacGillivray, Australian statistician, president of International Statistical Institute and Statistical Society of Australia
- Winifred Mackenzie (1896–1954), English statistician and missionary
- Jennifer Madans, American health statistician, acting director of National Center for Health Statistics
- Linda Malone (born 1944), American statistician, textbook author, and industrial engineer
- Amita Manatunga, Sri Lankan biostatistician
- Elizabeth Margosches, American statistician at the US Environmental Protection Agency
- Nancy Mann, American statistician known for her research on quality management, reliability estimation, and the Weibull distribution
- Elizabeth Mannshardt, American environmental statistician, studies climate change and extremes of weather and climate
- Angela Mariotto, Italian statistician, expert on cancer progress measures
- Marianthi Markatou, Greek-American biostatistician, expert on pharmacovigilance
- Cathie Marsh (1951–1993), British sociologist and statistician who made a case for the use of surveys in sociology
- Elizabeth A. Martin, American census statististian, introduced cognitive science principles to surveys and improved count of homeless
- Gael M. Martin, Australian Bayesian econometrician
- Margaret P. Martin (1915–2012), American biostatistician, published a series of papers on maternal and infant nutrition
- Wendy L. Martinez, American statistician, author of two books on MATLAB and coordinating editor of Statistics Surveys
- Rochelle Martinez, American government statistician
- Hélène Massam, Canadian statistician known for her research on the Wishart distribution and on graphical models
- Jil Matheson, former National Statistician of the UK
- Nancy Mathiowetz, American sociologist and statistician, combined cognitive psychology with survey methodology
- Margaret T. May, British biostatistician and epidemiolist, expert on life expectancy of HIV patients
- Deborah Mayo, frequentist statistician and professor of philosophy of science at Virginia Tech; author of books on probability and risk management
- Sally McClean, Northern Irish statistician, computer scientist, and operations researcher
- Leslie McClure, American biostatistician, champion for diversity, and statistics blogger
- Kelly McConville, American statistics educator and survey and environmental statistician
- Laura McKenna, American census statistician, expert on statistical disclosure control
- Lisa McShane, American biostatistician, oncologist, and expert on biomarkers and biometrics
- Fabrizia Mealli (born 1966), Italian researcher on causal inference, missing data, and the statistics of employment
- Elizabeth Meckes, American probability theorist
- Kerrie Mengersen (born 1962), Australian director of the Bayesian Research and Applications Group at Queensland University of Technology
- Margaret Merrell (1900–1995), American biostatistician known for her research on the construction of life tables
- Ida Craven Merriam (1904–1997), American Social Security economist and statistician who founded the National Academy of Social Insurance
- Jacqueline Meulman (born 1954), Dutch expert in multivariate analysis
- Mary C. Meyer, American expert in nonparametric density estimation with shape constraints
- Weiwen Miao, Chinese-American expert on legal statistics
- Ruth Mickey (born 1954), American expert in selection of confounding variables
- Diana Miglioretti, American biostatistician, expert on breast cancer screening and radiation hazards from medical imaging
- Ana Fernández Militino, Spanish spatial statistician
- Claire Miller, Scottish environmental statistician focusing on water quality
- Antonietta Mira, Italian expert in Markov chain Monte Carlo methods and in mathematical magic
- Lisa Mirel, American government statistician, president of Washington Statistical Society
- Carmen A. Miró (1919–2022), Panamanian demographer
- Nandita Mitra, American biostatistician, expert in causal inference, difference-in-difference, and health economics
- Yash Mittal (born 1941), first female program director for probability at US National Science Foundation
- Leyla Mohadjer, expert in survey methodology, total survey error, quality control, and participation bias
- Francesca Molinari, Italian econometrician and economic and survey statistician
- Katherine Monti, American statistician known for graphical methods and the statistics of pet health
- Irene Montie (1921–2018), American statistician for the Census Bureau; president of Caucus for Women in Statistics
- Erica Moodie, Canadian biostatistician, expert on dynamic treatment regimes
- Leslie M. Moore, applies statistics to scientific experiments and simulations
- Reneé H. Moore, American biostatistician, expert on obesity and sleep
- Knashawn H. Morales, American biostatistician
- Carolyn Morgan, American statistician and applied mathematician
- Motomi Mori, Japanese–American biostatistician who has studied hospital-acquired infections, bone marrow transplants, and personalized medicine
- June Morita, American statistics educator
- Pamela Morse (c. 1923–2009), British and Canadian agricultural statistician
- Alison Motsinger-Reif, American biostatistician and geneticist
- Irini Moustaki, Greek statistician, expert in psychometrics
- Bhramar Mukherjee, Indian-American biostatistician, chair of COPSS
- Jeri Mulrow, American government statistician, president of American Statistical Association
- Mary Mulry, American census statistician
- Susan Murphy (born 1958), applies statistical methods to clinical trials of treatments for chronic and relapsing medical conditions
- Susan Murray, American biostatistician, developed lung allocation score used to prioritize transplants
- Kary Myers, American expert on scientific data analysis and radiation monitoring
- Janet Myhre, founded Reed Institute for Decision Science at Claremont McKenna College

== N ==
One of Florence Nightingale's pioneering works in statistical graphics

- Mary Gibbons Natrella (1922–1988), author of a widely used handbook on statistics for scientific and engineering experiments
- Jennifer Clark Nelson, American biostatistician, expert on vaccine and drug safety and efficacy and the use and misuse of electronic health data
- Johanna G. Nešlehová, Czech-Canadian mathematical statistician, known for work on copula modeling and operational risk
- Anna Nevius, American biostatistician and expert in veterinary medicine
- Ethel Newbold (1882–1933), English epidemiologist and statistician, namesake of Ethel Newbold Prize for excellence in statistics
- Helen Alma Newton Turner (1908–1995), Australian authority on sheep genetics
- Florence Nightingale (1820–1910), English founder of modern nursing, pioneer in information visualization and statistical graphics
- Jing Ning, Chinese-American biostatistician
- Deborah A. Nolan, American statistician and statistics educator
- Sharon-Lise Normand, Canadian biostatistician who evaluates the quality of care provided by physicians and hospitals
- Delia North, a leader in statistics education in South Africa
- Janet L. Norwood (1923–2015), first female Commissioner of the U.S. Bureau of Labor Statistics
- Paula Norwood, American biostatistician, worked in pharmaceutical industry
- Rebecca Nugent, American statistician, data scientist, and statistics educator
- Sarah Nusser (born 1957), American survey statistician
- Regina Nuzzo, American statistician, science communicator, and teacher of statistics to the deaf
- Philomena Nyarko, chief executive of the Ghana Statistical Service
- Vera Nyitrai (1926–2011), president of the Hungarian Central Statistical Office and first female chair of the United Nations Statistical Commission

== O ==
- Nancy Obuchowski (born 1962), American biostatistician and radiologist
- Laura O'Dwyer, Irish-American statistician, performs statistical analyses of science education outcomes
- Judith O'Fallon, American medical statistician
- Sofia Olhede, British mathematical statistician known for her research on wavelets, graphons, and high-dimensional statistics
- Beatrice S. Orleans (died 2011), chief statistician in the US Naval Sea Systems Command
- Mollie Orshansky (1915–2006), American economist and statistician, set poverty thresholds for household income

== P ==
- Susan Paddock, American expert on nonparametric inference for substance abuse and autonomous vehicles
- Edna Paisano (1948–2014), demographer who improved the accuracy of the Native American US census category
- Gladys L. Palmer (1895–1967), American social statistician known for her work on labor mobility and labor statistics
- J. Lynn Palmer, American biostatistician known for her research on missing data and on treatments for cancer
- Mari Palta, Swedish biostatistician, president of the Caucus for Women in Statistics
- Anna Panorska, Polish-American expert on extreme events in stochastic processes and on the effect of weather on baseball performance
- Layla Parast, American biostatistician and public health commentator
- Cristina Parel, first Filipino to earn a doctorate in statistics
- Eun Sug Park, Korean-American transportation statistician
- Jennifer D. Parker, American statistician who studies connections between socioeconomics, pollution, and reproductive health
- Vera Pawlowsky-Glahn, Spanish statistician and geoscientist
- Roxy Peck, American statistics educator
- Magda Peligrad, Romanian probability theorist known for her work on stochastic processes
- Jane Pendergast, American biostatistician specializing in multivariate statistics and longitudinal data
- Olga Pendleton, American expert on road traffic safety and multiple linear regression
- Limin Peng, Chinese biostatistician, won Mortimer Spiegelman Award
- Marianna Pensky, Soviet and American mathematical statistician, expert on wavelets and Bayesian analysis
- Sharina Person, American biostatistician, directs Diversity Engagement Survey of the Association of American Medical Colleges
- Sonia Petrone, Italian statistician who uses Bernstein polynomials in nonparametric Bayesian methods
- Sonja Petrović, American mathematical statistician
- Maxine Pfannkuch, New Zealand statistics educator
- Ruth Pfeiffer, American biostatistician focusing on risk prediction, molecular epidemiology, and electronic medical records
- Polly Phipps, American survey and labor statistician
- Dominique Picard (born 1953), French expert on the statistical applications of wavelets
- Linda Williams Pickle, American expert on spatial data analysis
- E. C. Pielou (1924–2016), Canadian statistical ecologist
- Iris Pigeot (born 1960), German biostatistician, biometrician, and epidemiologist
- Shirley Pledger, New Zealand mathematician and statistician known for her work on mark and recapture methods
- Elżbieta Pleszczyńska (born 1933), Polish statistician, disability rights activist
- Anne Polivka, American economic statistician
- Raquel Prado (born 1970), Venezuelan statistician specializing in Bayesian analysis of time series
- Dionne Price, African-American statistician at the US Food and Drug Administration
- Megan Price, American statistician, uses statistics to investigate human rights violations
- Ruth Rice Puffer (1907–2002), led the Inter-American Investigation of Childhood Mortality at the Pan American Health Organization

== Q ==
- Annie Qu, Chinese statistician known for her work on estimating equations and semiparametric models

== R ==
- Sophia Rabe-Hesketh, American expert on generalized linear mixed models with latent variables
- Kavita Ramanan, Indian–American probability theorist
- Lila Knudsen Randolph (1908–1965), chief statistician at the Food and Drug Administration
- Nalini Ravishanker, Indian statistician interested in time series analysis and applications to actuarial science, business, and transportation
- Bonnie Ray, American statistician and data scientist
- Carol K. Redmond, American biostatistician known for her research on breast cancer
- Nancy Reid (born 1952), Canadian theoretical statistician, president of Institute of Mathematical Statistics and Statistical Society of Canada
- Gesine Reinert, German statistician at Oxford, expert on biological sequences and biological networks
- Jian-Jian Ren, Chinese-American statistician, expert in longitudinal data and survival analysis
- Patricia Reynaud-Bouret (born 1978), French expert on Hawkes processes with applications in neuroscience and genomics
- Gladys H. Reynolds, American statistician who did pioneering research on modeling sexually transmitted diseases
- Dorothy P. Rice (1922–2017), American health statistician who helped create the National Death Index
- Sylvia Richardson, French expert on Bayesian Markov Chain Monte Carlo methods for spatial statistics
- Jeanne Clare Ridley (1925–2007), American sociologist, statistician, and demographer, known for her work on fertility
- Carmen L. Rivera-Medina, Puerto Rican psychologist, statistician, and methodologist
- Naomi B. Robbins, American expert in data visualization
- Paula Roberson, American biostatistician, president of Caucus for Women in Statistics
- Rosemary Roberts, statistics educator who led the creation of AP Statistics
- Veronika Ročková, Czech-American Bayesian statistician
- Eliane R. Rodrigues, Brazilian-Mexican researcher on stochastic models for pollution and health
- Kathryn Roeder, American statistician who laid the foundations for DNA forensics
- Jennifer Rogers, British statistician and statistics communicator
- Judith Rousseau, French statistician who studies frequentist properties of Bayesian methods
- Sherri Rose, American biostatistician, focuses on statistical machine learning for health care policy
- Joan R. Rosenblatt, American statistician, director of computing and applied mathematics at the National Institute of Standards and Technology
- Naomi D. Rothwell, introduced behavioral research to the US Census, wrote about experiences running a halfway house
- Andrea Rotnitzky, Argentine expert on causal inference for medical interventions with missing data
- Gerta Rücker (born 1955), German expert on meta-analysis
- Cynthia Rudin (born 1976), American computer scientist and statistician known for her work in explainable artificial intelligence
- Pat Ruggles, American economist and social statistician who studies poverty
- Deborah J. Rumsey (born 1961), American statistics educator, founder of Consortium for the Advancement of Undergraduate Statistics Education
- Estelle Russek-Cohen, American biostatistician and expert in biometrics
- Barbara Falkenbach Ryan, American mathematician, computer scientist, statistician and business executive
- Louise M. Ryan, Australian expert on the statistics of cancer and risk assessment in environmental health
- Karen Ryberg, American hydrologist and environmental statistician

== S ==
- Chiara Sabatti, Italian-American statistical geneticist
- Mary D. Sammel, American biostatistician also known for her work with guide dogs
- Ester Samuel-Cahn (born 1933), winner of the Israel Prize for her work in statistics
- Lilly Sanathanan, Indian statistician, applied statistics to particle physics and drug development
- Brisa Sánchez, Mexican-American biostatistician and environmental epidemiologist
- Susan M. Sanchez (born 1959), American expert on data farming from agent-based simulation
- Matilde Sanchez-Kam, Filipino-American pharmaceutical statistician
- Huiyan Sang, Chinese-American spatial statistician
- Marta Sanz-Solé (born 1952), Catalan researcher on stochastic processes, president of the European Mathematical Society
- Jaya Satagopan, Indian-American biostatistician and epidemiologist, expert on genetic risk factors for cancer
- Sophie Schbath (born 1969), French statistician of patterns in strings and DNA
- Nora Cate Schaeffer, American sociologist and survey statistician
- Edna Schechtman (born 1948), Israeli expert on mean absolute difference methods, president of Israel Statistical Association
- Kendra Schmid, American statistician and academic administrator, expert on facial symmetry and attractiveness
- Alexandra M. Schmidt, Brazilian biostatistician and epidemiologist, president of ISBA
- Elizabeth Scott (1917–1988), applied statistics to astronomy and weather modification, promoted equal opportunity for women
- Marian Scott (born 1956), Scottish statistician specialising in environmental statistics and statistical modelling
- Marilyn Seastrom (born 1951), American educational statistician
- Paola Sebastiani, Italian biostatistician and genetic epidemiologist
- Nell Sedransk, American statistician who directed the National Institute of Statistical Sciences
- Esther Seiden (1908–2014), Polish–Israeli–American mathematical statistician known for her research on design of experiments and combinatorial design
- Kimberly Sellers, American expert on count data, statistical dispersion, and the Conway–Maxwell–Poisson distribution
- Diallo Sène (born 1952), Malian statistician, national minister for the promotion of women, children, and the family
- Damla Şentürk, Turkish-American biostatistician, expert on longitudinal and functional analysis for autism and dialysis
- Juliet Popper Shaffer (born 1932), American psychologist and statistician known for her research on multiple hypothesis testing
- Nagambal Shah, Indian-American mathematician and statistician known for her mentorship of minority students
- Michelle Shardell, American biostatistician, studies biomarkers for aging-related health outcomes
- Julia Sharp, American statistician, expert on scientific statistical collaborations
- Katrina Sharples, New Zealand biostatistician and violist
- Yu Shen, Chinese-American biostatistician, expert on survival data and cancer screening
- Lianne Sheppard, American expert on the health effects of air pollution
- Mindel C. Sheps (1913–1973), Canadian physician, biostatistician and demographer
- Stephanie Shipp, American economist and social statistician
- Galit Shmueli, Israeli expert in business statistics, author of multiple textbooks
- Susan Shortreed, American biostatistician, studies complex longitudinal data for personalized medicine
- Holly Shulman, American reproductive health statistician
- Debra T. Silverman, American biostatistician and cancer epidemiologist
- Eleanor Singer, Austrian-born American expert on survey methodology
- Judith D. Singer, American statistician known for her work on multilevel models, survival analysis, and individual growth models
- Janet Sinsheimer, American statistical geneticist
- Rosedith Sitgreaves (1915–1992), American researcher on random matrices and Kendall's W
- Elizabeth H. Slate, American statistician interested in the Bayesian statistics of longitudinal data and applications to health
- Aleksandra Slavković, American expert on statistical disclosure control, algebraic statistics, and applications in social science
- Margaret Smagorinsky (1915–2011), American government statistician and meteorologist
- Kirstine Smith (1878–1939), Danish statistician, created the field of optimal design of experiments
- Leah M. Smith, Canadian biostatistician and cancer researcher
- Joyce Snell (born 1930), British statistician known for her work on residuals and ordered categorical data, and for her books on statistics
- Rui Song, Chinese-American statistician, expert on causal inference, independence screening, precision medicine, and financial statistics
- Xinyuan Song, Chinese expert on structural equation modeling
- Mary Eleanor Spear (1897–1986), American data visualization specialist
- Donna Spiegelman, American biostatistician and epidemiologist
- Nancy Spruill, American statistician and defense acquisitions analyst
- Dalene Stangl, (1956–), American statistician, promoted use of Bayesian statistics in medicine and health policy
- Joan Staniswalis (1957–2018), American biostatistician, studied effects of air quality and racial inequality on health
- Ana-Maria Staicu, Romanian and American expert on functional regression
- Elizabeth Stasny, American expert on missing data in surveys
- Fiona Steele, British statistician who studies longitudinal data and applications in demography and education
- Alisa Stephens-Shields, American biostatistician, expert in clinical trials, pelvic pain, and testosterone treatment
- Maya Sternberg, American public health statistician
- Sandra Stinnett, American statistician specializing in the biostatistics of ophthalmology
- Victoria Stodden, American statistician focusing on the reproducibility of research in computational science
- Maura Stokes, American statistician, SAS developer, and young-adult novelist
- S. Lynne Stokes, American expert on modeling non-sampling errors, mark and recapture methods, and opinion polls
- Ineke Stoop (born 1953), Dutch survey statistician
- Deborah Street (born 1957), Australian expert on the design of experiments
- Cyntha Struthers (born c. 1954), Canadian mathematical statistician, president of Caucus for Women in Statistics
- Elizabeth A. Stuart, American researcher on causal inference and missing data in the statistics of mental health
- Thérèse Stukel, Canadian statistician interested in surgical mortality, regional variations in healthcare spending, and cardiology
- Catherine Sugar, American biostatistician who studies cluster analysis, covariance, and applications in medicine and psychiatry
- Lisa M. Sullivan (born 1961), American biostatistician associated with the Framingham Heart Study
- Jiayang Sun, Chinese-American statistician, president of Caucus for Women in Statistics
- Lei Sun, Chinese-Canadian statistical geneticist
- Nike Sun, American probability theorist studying phase transitions and counting complexity
- Yanqing Sun, Chinese-American biostatistician
- Rajeshwari Sundaram, Indian biostatistician, expert in survival analysis and reproductive health
- Deborah F. Swayne, American expert on information visualization who wrote the GGobi software package

== T ==
- Loni Tabb, American biostatistician, applies spatial statistics to the geographic distribution of societal problems
- Mahlet Tadesse, Ethiopian-American biostatistican focusing on Bayesian genomics
- Irene Barnes Taeuber (1906–1974), American editor of Population Index who helped establish the science of demography
- Judith Tanur, American editor of the International Encyclopedia of Social Sciences
- Mahbanoo Tata (born 1942), Indian-born Iranian statistician
- Nancy Temkin, American statistician who works on the biostatistics of traumatic brain injury
- Dorothy Swaine Thomas (1899–1977), population growth expert who became first female president of the American Sociological Association
- Lori Thombs, American social statistician, president of Southern Regional Council On Statistics
- C. Jean Thompson (born 1940), president of New Zealand Statistical Association
- Elizabeth A. Thompson (born 1949), English-born American statistician, uses genetic data to infer relationships between individuals and populations
- Jean Helen Thompson (1926–1992), British chief statistician in Office of Population Censuses and Surveys, president of British Society for Population Studies
- Katherine J. Thompson, American statistician in the Census Bureau, president of ASA Section on Government Statistics
- Mary E. Thompson, Canadian statistician known for her work in tobacco control, and president of the Statistical Society of Canada
- Sally Thurston, American biostatistician and environmental health statistician
- Ene-Margit Tiit (born 1934), Estonian mathematician and statistician, founding president of Estonian Statistical Society
- Barbara Tilley, American biostatistician, president of Caucus for Women in Statistics
- Kate Tilling, British statistician interested in applications to epidemiology and health services
- Elizabeth Tipton, American statistician, applies causal inference from meta-analysis to social statistics
- Mary N. Torrey (born 1910), American mathematical statistician and expert in quality control
- Sherry Towers, American and Canadian statistician, studied contagion effect of mass shootings
- Andrea Troxel, American biostatistician, expert in behavioral economics in public health
- Jung-Ying Tzeng, Taiwanese-American statistical geneticist

== U ==
- María Dolores Ugarte, Spanish spatial statistician and epidemiologist
- Caroline Uhler (1935– ), Swiss statistician specializing in algebraic statistics and its applications in genomics
- Theresa Utlaut, American statistical quality control engineer at Intel
- Jessica Utts (born 1952), American parapsychologist, statistics educator, and president of the American Statistical Association

== V ==
- Angelika van der Linde, German expert on Bayesian model complexity
- Ingrid Van Keilegom (born 1971), Belgian statistician interested in nonparametric statistics and survival analysis
- Mary van Kleeck (1883–1972), American social feminist and proponent of scientific management and a planned economy
- Jennifer Van Mullekom, American industrial statistician and statistical consulting educator
- Marina Vannucci (born 1966), Italian expert in wavelets, feature selection, and cluster analysis in Bayesian statistics
- Maria Eulália Vares, Brazilian expert in stochastic processes
- Eva Vedel Jensen (born 1951), Danish spatial statistician, stereologist, and stochastic geometer
- Marit Veierød, Norwegian biostatistian and epidemiologist, studies environmental factors related to melanoma
- Maria-Pia Victoria-Feser, Swiss statistician, applies robust statistics to statistical finance and biostatistics
- Olga Vitek, biostatistician and computer scientist specializing in bioinformatics and proteomics
- Júlia Volaufová, Slovak biostatistician, studies nutrition and mixed models

== W ==
- Jane Wadsworth (1942–1997), British medical statistician and sexual health researcher
- Grace Wahba (born 1934), American pioneer in methods for smoothing noisy data
- Patricia Wahl, American biostatistician and academic administrator at the University of Washington
- Helen M. Walker (1891–1983), first female president of the American Statistical Association
- Melanie Wall (born 1971), American psychiatric biostatistician, psychometrician, and mental health data scientist
- Katherine Wallman, Chief Statistician of the United States and president of the American Statistical Association
- Huixia Judy Wang, Chinese–American expert on quantile regression
- Jane-Ling Wang, studies dimension reduction, functional data analysis, and aging
- Lan Wang, Chinese-American expert on high-dimensional statistics and quantile regression
- Lily Wang, Chinese-American statistician, studies non- and semi-parametric methods for large high-dimensional data sets
- Lu Wang, Chinese-American biostatistician, researches dynamic treatment decisions
- Mei-Cheng Wang, Taiwanese biostatistician known for her work on survival analysis and truncation
- Naisyin Wang, Taiwanese statistician, president of the International Chinese Statistical Association
- Sherry Wang, Chinese-American statistician, applied Bayesian modeling and machine learning to computer security and genomics
- Sue-Jane Wang, biostatistician in the US Food and Drug Administration
- Yuanjia Wang, Chinese-American expert on precision medicine for mental health
- Marie Wann, American government statistician, president of Caucus for Women in Statistics
- Ann E. Watkins, American statistics educator, president of the Mathematical Association of America
- Kimberly Weems, American statistician active in mentoring women and members of underrepresented groups
- Ying Wei, Chinese statistician interested in quantile regression and semiparametric models of longitudinal data
- Clarice Weinberg, American environmental biostatistician and epidemiologist
- Lisa Weissfeld, American biostatistician, coauthor of pneumonia severity index and of WLW model in recurrent event analysis
- Joanne Wendelberger, American statistician and a scientist at the Los Alamos National Laboratory
- Nanny Wermuth (born 1943), German and Swedish expert in graphical Markov models and their applications in the life sciences
- Jessamine S. Whitney (1880–1941), American statistician and public health professional
- Alice S. Whittemore (1936–2025), American group theorist, biostatistician, and epidemiologist who studies the effects of genetics and lifestyle on cancer
- Aryness Joy Wickens (1901–1991), American labor statistician and president of the American Statistical Association
- Rebecca Willett, American statistician and computer scientist working in machine learning, signal processing, and data science
- Ruth J. Williams, American probability theorist, president of Institute of Mathematical Statistics, member of National Academy of Sciences
- Alyson Wilson (born 1967), American expert on Bayesian reliability and military statistics
- Susan R. Wilson (born 1948), Australian statistician known for studying biostatistics, statistical genetics, and the spread of AIDS in Australia
- Sharon Witherspoon (born 1956), British Head of Policy of the Academy of Social Sciences, founding researcher of British Social Attitudes Survey
- Daniela Witten, American biostatistician interested in machine learning and high-dimensional data
- Janet Wittes, American statistician and statistical consultant specializing in clinical trials
- Frances Wood (1883–1919), English medical statistician, namesake of Wood medal of Royal Statistical Society
- Hilda Mary Woods (1892–1971), British epidemiologist, first female lecturer at the London School of Hygiene and Tropical Medicine
- Jane Worcester (died 1989), American biostatistician and epidemiologist, second tenured woman at the Harvard School of Public Health
- Margaret Wu, Australian statistician, developed estimators for genetic diversity
- Margaret C. Wu, American biostatistician, expert on censored data
- Grace Wyshak, American biostatistician, used twin studies to link behavioral factors to health risks

== X ==
- Ronghui Xu, Chinese-American biostatistician, expert on random effects models and developmental toxicity
- Xinyi Xu, Chinese-American Bayesian statistician
- Yanxun Xu, Chinese-American statistician, applies Bayesian methods and generative AI to complex data in biomedicine and materials science

== Y ==
- Grace Yang, Chinese–American expert on stochastic processes in the physical sciences, asymptotic theory, and survival analysis
- Jean Yang, Australian statistician known for her work on microarray and mass spectrometry data
- Shu Yang, Chinese-American expert on causal inference, survey sampling, and missing data
- Grace Y. Yi, Chinese–Canadian expert in event history analysis with missing data in medicine, engineering, and social science
- Linda J. Young (born 1952), Chief Mathematical Statistician at the National Agricultural Statistics Service
- Cleo Youtz (1909–2005), long-time research assistant of Frederick Mosteller
- Ruriko Yoshida, Japanese-American combinatorist, statistician, phylogeneticist, and operations researcher
- Bin Yu, Chinese–American statistician, president of the Institute of Mathematical Statistics
- Qingzhao Yu, Chinese–American biostatistician, expert in mediation analysis
- Yan Yu, Chinese-American financial statistician, expert in nonlinear regression, data privacy, and bankruptcy prediction
- Yi Yu, Chinese statistician in the UK, expert on high-dimensional statistics, change detection, and spectral methods
- Lilly Yue, Statistician in the US Food & Drug Administration, expert on real-world evidence

== Z ==
- Ann Zauber, American biostatistician whose research demonstrated the effectiveness of colonoscopy
- Judy Zeh, American statistician known for Bayesian estimation of bowhead whale populations
- Rita Zemach (1926–2015), American statistician who worked for the Michigan Department of Public Health
- Chunming Zhang, Chinese-American nonparametric statistician and neuroscientist
- Emma Zhang, Chinese–American statistician of complex systems
- Hao Helen Zhang, Chinese–American expert in nonparametric statistics, data mining, and machine learning
- Hongmei Zhang, Chinese-American biostatistician, expert in epigenetics
- Lan Zhang, Chinese-American financial econometrician
- Nancy R. Zhang, American statistical geneticist
- Linda Zhao, Chinese-American statistician, applies machine learning to real estate pricing
- Yingqi Zhao, Chinese-American biostatistician, applies statistical learning to personalized medicine and dynamic treatment regimes
- Tian Zheng, Chinese-American applied statistician, studies complex data for social networks, bioinformatics, and geoscience
- Wenxuan Zhong, Chinese-American statistician, expert on big data
- Jun Zhu, American statistician and entomologist interested in spatio-temporal data and environmental statistics
- Ilze Ziedins, New Zealand queueing theorist, expert on stochastic networks
- Rebecca Zwick, American expert on educational assessment and college admissions

== See also ==
- Caucus for Women in Statistics
- List of female scientists
- List of women in mathematics
