= Regina Loewenstein =

American statistician

Regina L. Loewenstein (February 10, 1916 – May 16, 1999) was an American public health statistician who worked as a lecturer in the Columbia University Mailman School of Public Health.

== Life ==
Loewenstein was born on February 10, 1916. She graduated from Barnard College in 1936, and earned a master's degree in mathematics from Columbia University in 1937, with the master's thesis The elliptic functions of Legendre and Jacobi.

In 1948, she was chief of the operations department of the Study of Child Health Services of the American Academy of Pediatrics. Beginning in the late 1940s, she worked with Gilbert Wheeler Beebe as a statistics researcher in the Medical Follow-up Agency of the National Research Council (NRC), and by 1952 she was listed as chief of the statistics section of the Committee on Veterans Medical Problems of the NRC, before later returning to Columbia as a faculty member.

In 1971, she helped found the Caucus for Women in Statistics of the American Statistical Association, serving as one of its four original executive committee members. She was also active for many years in the American Public Health Association.

== Recognition ==
Loewenstein was named a Fellow of the American Statistical Association in 1976. Columbia University offers a student prize, the Regina Loewenstein Prize for Academic Excellence in Health Policy and Management, named in her honor.
