= Elizabeth Mannshardt =

American environmental statistician

- Education: Sonoma State University, University of North Carolina at Chapel Hill
- Known for: Chair of the Government Statistics Section of the American Statistical Association
- Scientific career
- Fields: Environmental statistics
- Thesis: Asymptotic Multivariate Kriging Using Estimated Parameters with Bayesian Prediction Methods for Non-Linear Predictands
- Doctoral advisor: Richard L. Smith

Elizabeth Mannshardt (also published as Elizabeth C. Mannshardt-Shamseldin and Elizabeth Mannshardt-Hawk) is an executive at a leading research firm, environmental statistician, and adjunct professor. She joined Westat in 2024 as vice president and Director, Statistics and Data Science. She is an adjunct associate professor in the department of statistics at North Carolina State University.

== Education and career ==
Mannshardt is from Yuba City, California, and was the 1995 valedictorian of Yuba City High School. She majored in mathematics at Sonoma State University, and did graduate study in statistics at the University of North Carolina at Chapel Hill, earning a master's degree in 2005 and completing her PhD in 2008. Her dissertation, Asymptotic Multivariate Kriging Using Estimated Parameters with Bayesian Prediction Methods for Non-Linear Predictands, was supervised by Richard L. Smith. Her research focused on climate change and extremes in climate and weather.

While a doctoral student, Mannshardt was also a research fellow at the National Oceanic and Atmospheric Administration. She became a postdoctoral researcher at the Statistical and Applied Mathematical Sciences Institute, working with Peter F. Craigmile, and a visiting assistant professor at Duke University before becoming a government statistician at the EPA.

Mannshardt was the associate director then acting Director of the Information Access and Analytic Services Division at the United States Environmental Protection Agency.

Mannshardt served as the director of the Statistics Methods and Innovation Program at the National Center for Science and Engineering Statistics at the National Science Foundation (2022–2024).

Mannshardt chaired the Government Statistics Section of the American Statistical Association (ASA) in 2019. She is the 2022 chair of the ASA Section on Statistics and the Environment and currently serves as the Vice Chair of ASA's Membership Council (2023-)

== Recognition ==
Mannshardt was named as a Fellow of the American Statistical Association in 2022.

== Personal life ==
Mannshardt is married to software test architect James Hawk. She is also an avid beach and grass volleyball player, occasionally playing in co-ed events with her husband.
