= Jennifer Van Mullekom =

American statistician

Jennifer H. Van Mullekom is an American statistician. She works at Virginia Tech as director of the Statistical Applications and Innovations Group, and as professor of practice in the Department of Statistics. Her work in the Statistical Applications and Innovations Group involves mentoring graduate students in statistics in their collaborations with researchers across the Virginia Tech campus.

== Education and career ==
Van Mullekom was an undergraduate at Concord College in Athens, West Virginia, where she received two bachelor's degrees in mathematics and mathematics education in 1993 and 1994 respectively, and also earned minors in computer science and statistics. She continued her studies in statistics at Virginia Tech, where she received a master's degree in 1995 and completed her Ph.D. in 1998.

After briefly working as an adjunct faculty member in the Case Western Reserve University Department of Chemical Engineering and in the Lakeland Community College Department of Science and Health, both in Ohio, she left academia to work in industry, at Lubrizol, Capital One, and DuPont. In 2016 she returned to Virginia Tech, becoming associate professor of practice and director of the Statistical Applications and Innovations Group.

Van Mullekom has also held various leadership roles in the American Statistical Association (ASA) and American Society for Quality (ASQ), including chairing the ASA Section on Physical and Engineering Sciences in 2007 and 2016, and chairing the ASQ Chemical and Process Industries Division in 2018.

== Recognition ==
Van Mullekom was named as the 2024 Outstanding Mentor of the ASA Section on Statistical Consulting. She was elected to the 2025 class of Fellows of the American Statistical Association, and selected as a plenary speaker for the 2025 Quality and Productivity Research Conference.
