= Kelly McConville =

American statistician

Kelly S. McConville is an American statistician and statistics educator whose research interests include survey methodology, the applications of environmental statistics to forestry, and the effects of voter identification laws. She is the inaugural Director for the Dominguez Center for Data Science at Bucknell University. Through Spring 2024, she was a senior lecturer and the co-director of Undergraduate Studies in statistics at Harvard University.

== Education and career ==
McConville majored in mathematics at St. Olaf College, graduating in 2006. She went to Colorado State University for graduate study in statistics, earning a master's degree there in 2008, and completing her Ph.D. in 2011. Her dissertation, Improved Estimation for Complex Surveys Using Modern Regression Techniques, was jointly supervised by Jay Breidt and Thomas C. M. Lee.

Prior to joining Harvard as a senior lecturer in 2021, she spent ten years teaching statistics in the mathematics departments of small liberal arts colleges, including Swarthmore College, Whitman College, and most recently, as an associate professor of statistics at Reed College.

She is the 2023 chair elect of the Section on Statistics and Data Science Education of the American Statistical Association.

== Recognition ==
In 2022, McConville was elected as a Fellow of the American Statistical Association.
