= Jonaki Bose =

Indian and American statistician

Jonaki Bose is an Indian and American government statistician, expert on survey methodology, senior advisor to the National Center for Health Statistics, and former president of the Washington Statistical Society.

== Education and career ==
Bose is originally from India, where she studied science as a high school student. She emigrated to the United States to begin her undergraduate studies at Purdue University. There she received a bachelor's degree in communications, with minors in mathematics, French, and art and design.

After graduating in the mid-1990s, she obtained a job in data collection at the National Center for Education Statistics (NCES), beginning her lifelong career in government statistics. While continuing to work there, she received a master's degree through part-time study in the Joint Program in Survey Methodology at the University of Maryland, College Park, and began working on survey methodology at the NCES. After being seconded to the Office of Management and Budget, she then moved to the Bureau of Transportation Statistics and then to the Substance Abuse and Mental Health Services Administration. In 2017, she was branch chief of the Populations Surveys Branch there, and by 2022, she had become a senior advisor to the National Center for Health Statistics.

She served as president of the Washington Statistical Society for the 2011–2012 term.

== Recognition ==
Bose was named as a Fellow of the American Statistical Association, in the 2016 class of fellows.
