= Shonda Kuiper =

American statistician

- Education: Wartburg College; Iowa State University (PhD)
- Occupations: Statistician; professor

Shonda Roelfs Kuiper is a professor of statistics and statistics educator at Grinnell College and a former statistician for Hallmark Cards. She chairs the Joint Committee on Statistics Education of the American Statistical Association and Mathematical Association of America, and is the author of a statistics textbook with J. Sklar, Practicing Statistics: Guided Investigations for the Second Course (Pearson, 2012).

Kuiper did her undergraduate studies in mathematics at Wartburg College, graduating in 1990, and earned a master's degree and Ph.D. in statistics at Iowa State University in 1994 and 1997 respectively. Her dissertation, supervised jointly by Herbert T. David and Derrick K. Rollins, was Several techniques to detect and identify systematic biases when process constraints are bilinear. She worked as a quality engineer at Hallmark from 1997 to 2001, when she returned to Wartburg as an assistant professor of mathematics. She moved to Grinnell in 2003.

In 2017, she became a Fellow of the American Statistical Association.
