= Sarah Abramowitz =

American statistician

- Born: 1967 (age 58–59)
- Education: Cornell University; Stony Brook University; New York University (PhD)
- Occupation: Statistician

Sarah Knapp Abramowitz (born 1967) is an American statistician specializing in statistics education and known for her textbooks on the use of statistical software packages. She is the John H. Evans Professor of Mathematics and Computer Science at Drew University, where she chairs the Mathematics & Computer Science Department.

== Education and career ==
Abramowitz majored in mathematics at Cornell University, graduating in 1989, and earned a master's degree in mathematics in 1992 from Stony Brook University. She switched to mathematics education for her doctoral studies, completing her Ph.D. in 1999 at New York University. Her dissertation was A computer-enhanced course in descriptive statistics at the college level: An analysis of student achievement and attitudes, and was supervised by Sharon L. Weinberg.

While still a graduate student, she worked as an adjunct assistant professor of mathematics at St. Francis College. She joined the Drew University faculty as an assistant professor in 1998, was tenured as an associate professor in 2004, and was promoted to full professor in 2011. She was named Evans Professor in 2021. At Drew, she has also served as the faculty representative to the NCAA for Drew's athletics program.

== Books ==
With her doctoral advisor, Sharon L. Weinberg, Abramowitz is the co-author of a series of textbooks on statistical software packages:

- Data Analysis for the Behavioral Sciences Using SPSS (2002)
- Statistics Using SPSS: An Integrative Approach (2nd ed., 2008)
- Statistics Using IBM SPSS: An Integrative Approach (3rd ed., 2016)
- Statistics Using Stata: An Integrative Approach (2016)
- Statistics Using R: An Integrative Approach (also with Daphna Harel, 2020)
