= Rochelle Martinez =

American government statistician

Rochelle (Shelly) Wilkie Martinez is an American government statistician.

== Career ==
Martinez became a researcher for the United States House of Representatives in 1989, associated with the Subcommittee on Census, Statistics, and Postal Personnel. She moved to the United States Department of Commerce in 1995, where she assisted with the design of the 2000 United States census, and in 1997 she moved to the United States Census Bureau itself. At the Census Bureau, she became a branch chief in the Data Integration Division. She moved again to the Office of Management and Budget in 2007. There, she spearheaded an effort to organize the government's statistical application of administrative data.

In 2016 to 2017, Martinez became executive director of the U.S. Commission on Evidence-Based Policymaking. Her work for the commission has included efforts to balance privacy concerns, especially of data on student performance, with the ability to make use of the data across different agencies, as well as the development of processes for creating, releasing, using and managing open data in the federal government.

== Recognition ==
Martinez was elected as a Fellow of the American Statistical Association in 2020.
