= Marianthi Markatou =

Greek-American biostatistician

Marianthi Markatou is a Greek-American biostatistician whose research interests include robust statistics and semiparametric models, the applications of natural language processing in the statistics derived from medical records, drug safety, and chemokines as biomarkers. She is Associate Chair of Research and Healthcare Informatics and SUNY Distinguished Professor at the University at Buffalo.

== Education and career ==
Markatou has a bachelor's degree in mathematics and physics from the University of Patras in Greece, and a master's degree in statistics from the University of Rochester. She completed a Ph.D. at Pennsylvania State University in 1988. Her dissertation, Robust Bounded Influence Tests in Linear Models, was supervised by Thomas Hettmansperger.

She became a professor of biostatistics and biomedical informatics at Columbia University, before taking her present position at the University at Buffalo. She was named a distinguished professor in 2021. In 2022 she was appointed co-editor-in-chief of International Statistical Review.

== Recognition ==
Markatou is a Fulbright Scholar, and an Elected Member of the International Statistical Institute. She was elected as a Fellow of the American Statistical Association in 2004, and as a Fellow of the Institute of Mathematical Statistics in 2021, "for outstanding accomplishments on fundamental research in robust statistics and for a strong commitment to the advancement of statistical science through interdisciplinary research and professional service".
