= Lisa Lix =

Canadian health scientist and biostatistician

Lisa Marie Lix (born 1966) is a Canadian health scientist and biostatistician at the University of Manitoba, where she holds a Canada Research Chair. Topics in her research have included cohort studies and the analysis of variance as well as bowel disease and disease-related bone fracture risk.

== Education and career ==
Lix majored in home economics at the University of Saskatchewan, graduating in 1988. After a 1991 master's degree in human ecology at the University of Manitoba, she earned her Ph.D. at the University of Manitoba in 1995, in an interdisciplinary program combining statistics, psychology, and human ecology. Her dissertation, Probing Interactions in Repeated Measures Designs: Applications in Clothing and Textiles Research, was supervised by Harvey Keselman.

She became a researcher at the University of Manitoba in 2001, and an assistant professor of community health sciences there in 2002. From 2008 to 2012 she also held a position as associate professor at the University of Saskatchewan, while keeping a part-time faculty appointment at the University of Manitoba. She returned to full time at Manitoba as a full professor in 2012.

She directed the Biostatistics Consulting Unit at the University of Manitoba from 2005 to 2008, and has directed the Data Science Unit of the George and Fay Yee Centre for Healthcare Innovation since 2012. She was president of the Biostatistics Section of the Statistical Society of Canada for 2010.

== Recognition ==
Lix held a Manitoba Research Chair from 2012 to 2017, and holds a Tier I Canada Research Chair in Methods for Electronic Health Data Quality in the Department of Community Health Sciences since 2018. She was named a Fellow of the American Statistical Association in 2020. She was elected chair of the ASA Health Policy Statistics program in 2021.
