= Susan Ahmed =

American statistician

Susan Mae Wolofski Ahmed (born 1946) is an American statistician. After early work in biostatistics, she became chief mathematical statistician in the National Center for Education Statistics and president of the Washington Statistical Society.

== Education and career ==
Susan Wolofski graduated in 1968 from Kalamazoo College, majoring in mathematics with an honors thesis concerning game theory. She earned a master's degree in public health in 1970 from the University of Michigan. In 1975, as Susan Wolofski Ahmed, she completed a Ph.D. at the University of North Carolina at Chapel Hill, with the dissertation Discriminant Analysis when the Initial Samples Are Contaminated supervised by Peter A. Lachenbruch.

In the 1980s, Ahmed performed biostatistics research, affiliated with the Department of Biostatistics and Epidemiology of the Georgetown University School of Medicine, including highly cited work on how inflammatory bowel disease and its treatment can affect pregnancy outcomes. By the 1990s, she had shifted to government and policy applications of statistics, as chief mathematical statistician in the Statistical Standards and Services Group of the National Center for Education Statistics. After retiring from the government, she was named a senior fellow for statistical services at Mathematica Policy Research in 2006.

== Service and recognition ==
Ahmed was president of the Washington Statistical Society for the 1994–1995 term. In 1995, she was elected as a Fellow of the American Statistical Association.
