= Jane Wadsworth =

Medical statistician (1942–1997)

- Born: Jane Arnott; 1942; United Kingdom
- Died: 1997 (aged 54–55)
- Occupation: Medical Statistician
- Known for: Author of Sexual Attitudes and Lifestyles research study
- Spouse: Michael Wadsworth
- Children: Emma Wadsworth, Harry Wadsworth

Jane Wadsworth (1942–1997) was a medical statistician and a pioneer in academic sexual health research.

== Early life ==
Wadsworth was born in 1942, during the Second World War, as the eldest of four children. Her family moved to Sevenoaks, where her father established a GP practice after his demobilisation.

== Career ==
Following an education at West Heath Girls' School, Wadsworth went on to study mathematics at St. Andrews University, Scotland. She met her husband, Michael Wadsworth, in London and the couple moved to Edinburgh, where they started their young family. Following their return to London, Jane began working part-time at the Institute for Social Sciences in Medical Care.

When her youngest child began school, Wadsworth returned to education and completed an MSc in Medical Statistics at the London School of Hygiene. This was followed by a series of research positions in London, Bristol and Exeter, before she took on the position of Lecturer in Medical Statistics at St Mary's Hospital Medical School in 1983. While with the hospital, Wadsworth contributed to several clinical studies, inclining a study of pelvic pain syndrome with Professor Richard Beard and the Nation Childhood Encephalopathy Study with Professor David Miller.

When the AIDS epidemic arrived, Wadsworth became involved in determining the pattern of the HIV infection throughout Britain. This was the first attempt to conduct a study about sexual behaviour in the UK, and gave her the opportunity to take the leading role in initiating her own research programme for the first time. During this period, Wadsworth's personal life became more strained, however, and her marriage broke up in the late 1980s.

After several years of laying the foundations for sex research, Wadsworth, together with Julia Field, Anne Johnson and Kaye Wellings, embarked on a national study, during which they interviewed 18,876 men and women about their sex lives. The study was filmed by Horizon for television, and the women briefly found themselves in the eye of the media. In 1994, Wadsworth and her fellow researchers published Sexual Attitudes and Lifestyle, detailing the results of the survey. A version of this, Sexual Behaviour in Britain, was serialised in the Independent on Sunday. As the first of its kind, the National Survey of Sexual Attitudes and Lifestyle (NATSAL) became both the gold standard and the model for subsequent studies for a number of countries around the world.

== Awards and honours ==
The Jane Wadsworth clinic for Sexual Health of the Jefferiss wing at St. Mary's Hospital, Paddington, was named for her.
