= Carmen L. Rivera-Medina =

Puerto Rican psychologist

- Education: University of Puerto Rico, Río Piedras Campus (B.A., Ph.D.); University of Puerto Rico, Medical Sciences Campus (M.S.)
- Scientific career
- Fields: Psychology, statistics, and methodology
- Workplaces: University of Puerto Rico, Río Piedras Campus

Carmen L. Rivera-Medina is a Puerto Rican psychologist, statistician, and methodologist. She is an instructor at University of Puerto Rico, Río Piedras Campus where she works as a statistician and methodologist in the Institute for Psychological Research.

== Education ==
Rivera-Medina completed a B.A. in psychology, cum laude, at University of Puerto Rico, Río Piedras Campus (UPRRP) in 1985. In 1991, she earned a M.S. in evaluation research with a minor in biostatistics from the Graduate School of Public Health at the University of Puerto Rico, Medical Sciences Campus. From August 1999 to July 2000, she was a predoctoral intern in the mental health division of the head start program at the New York Foundling of Puerto Rico. While there, she performed psychometric evaluations, psychotherapeutic interventions, and planned workshops for clients and employees of the head start program. In this same time period, she was also a predoctoral intern in the department of psychology at the San Juan Veterans Administration Medical Center where she conducted psychotherapeutic interventions with veterans and their families. In 2001, Rivera-Medina completed a Ph.D. in clinical psychology from UPRRP. Her dissertation was titled Predictive and discriminant value of the Child Depression Inventory for Major Depression Disorder. From January 2002 to June 2004, she was a postdoc in the mental health and HIV cluster at the UPRRP Biomedical Research Infrastructure Network Program. Starting in January 2016, Rivera-Medina is a postdoc specialized in bioneuroemotion at the Enric Corbera Institute in Barcelona in conjunction with the Iberoamerican University Torreón.

== Career ==
In 2007, Rivera-Medina became an instructor at UPRRP of graduate studies in advanced statistics, design methods, inferential statistics applied to psychology, and the theory and methods for the evaluation of intervention and research programs. Starting in September 2008, she works as a statistician and methodologist at the Institute for Psychological Research in the faculty of social sciences at UPRRP. She advises and directs faculty, and graduate and undergraduate students in their statistical strategy analysis. In 2015, she was an invited professor of quantitative research and applied psychology at Universidad del Valle de Guatemala.

=== Research ===
At UPRRP from September 2005 to August 2008, Rivera-Medina was the principal investigator a study on major depressive disorder among a Puerto Rican low-income probability statistic using an existing dataset. It was funded by an R24 NIH grant from the National Institute of Mental Health.
