= Carmen Batanero =

Spanish professor

Academic background
- Education: Doctorate in Mathematics
- Alma mater: University of Granada

Academic work
- Discipline: Statistics, Mathematics

Carmen Batanero is a Spanish statistics educator, and a Senior Lecturer in the Mathematics Department at the University of Granada, Spain. She is known as an advocate for statistics education. Batanero is a lifetime member of the International Association for Statistical Education, and served as the association's president from 2001 to 2003. She has co-authored many scholarly articles in the fields of mathematics and statistics education over the past two decades, and is credited on two statistics textbooks. Her contributions rank her as one of the most influential researchers at her institution. Dr. Batanero obtained her doctorate from the University of Granada in 1983, with the thesis paper Modelos de choque y exposición intermitente a riesgo de fallo.

== Books ==
Batanero, Carmen; Burrill, Gail; Reading, Chris (2011). Teaching Statistics in School Mathematics-Challenges for Teaching and Teacher Education. Springer. ISBN 978-94-007-1131-0.

Batanero, Carmen; Borovcnik, Manfred (2016). Statistics and Probability in High School. Sense Publishers. ISBN 978-94-630-0623-1.
