= Lila Knudsen Randolph =

- Born: 1908
- Died: August 29, 1965 (aged 56–57); Bethesda, Maryland, U.S.
- Education: University of Minnesota
- Scientific career
- Fields: Statistics
- Workplaces: Food and Drug Administration

Lila Knudsen Randolph (1908 – August 29, 1965 in Bethesda, Maryland) was the chief statistician at the Food and Drug Administration and a Fellow of the American Statistical Association. At the FDA, her work involved statistical sampling of food and drugs, and "she was instrumental in developing practical applications of statistics in the validation of analytical methods". She also did early work in computational statistics, writing in the Journal of the American Statistical Association in 1942 about the use of punched cards to construct orthogonal polynomials.

Lila F. Knudsen was originally from Minnesota. She completed her undergraduate education at the University of Minnesota, with additional graduate training at the US Department of Agriculture Graduate School, and became chief statistician at the Food and Drug Administration (FDA) in 1939. She married another FDA worker, Josh Randolph, in 1951, and moved to the National Institutes of Health, where she worked on a part-time basis from 1957 to 1959. She returned to the FDA as a consultant in 1962.

The American Statistical Association elected her as a fellow in 1964 "for her application of statistics to pharmacology and pharmacy; and for the establishment and administration of a statistical program in the Food and Drug Administration".
