= Nedret Billor =

Turkish statistician

- Education: Ankara University (1983); Çukurova University (1985); University of Sheffield (1992)
- Scientific career
- Institutions: Çukurova University; Auburn University
- Thesis: Diagnostic Methods in Ridge Regression and Errors-in-variables Model (1992)
- Doctoral advisor: R. M. Loynes

Nedret Billor is a Turkish statistician known for her work on robust statistics and outlier detection. She is a professor of statistics at Auburn University.

== Education and career ==
Billor graduated from Ankara University in 1983, and earned a master's degree at Çukurova University in 1985. She completed a Ph.D. in statistics at the University of Sheffield in 1992; her dissertation, Diagnostic Methods in Ridge Regression and Errors-in-variables Model, was supervised by Robert Loynes.

She returned to Çukurova University as an assistant professor in 1993 and was promoted to associate professor in 1997 and professor in 2003. In 2014, she moved to her present position at Auburn University. In 2019–2020, she served as chair of the Auburn University Senate.

== Recognition ==
Billor became an Elected Member of the International Statistical Institute in 2012.
