= Pamela Morse =

British and Canadian agricultural statistician

Pamela Mary Morse (née Clarke, c. 1923 – November 9, 2009) was a British and Canadian agricultural statistician who worked for many years as a researcher for the Statistical Research Service of Agriculture Canada.

== Education and career ==
Pamela Clarke earned a master's degree in mathematics from the University of Oxford in 1949. She worked at the Rothamsted Experimental Station from 1947 to 1949, for the National Institute for Research in Dairying from 1949 to 1957, and for the United Kingdom Atomic Energy Authority in 1957 and 1958.

In 1958, she became a research scientist for the Statistical Research Service of the Canada Department of Agriculture (later, Agriculture Canada), where she would remain for the rest of her career. She married Eric Morse in 1959, and used the name Morse for her subsequent publications.

== Recognition ==
In 1984, the American Statistical Association named Morse a Fellow of the American Statistical Association.

== Selected publications ==
- Baxter, Eleanor S.; Clarke, Pamela M.; Dodd, F. H.; Foot, A. S. (June 1950), "415. Factors affecting the rate of machine milking", Journal of Dairy Research, 17 (2): 117–127, doi:10.1017/s0022029900005719, S2CID 86698346
- Bradley, T. R.; Clarke, Pamela M. (August 1956), "The response of rabbit mammary glands to locally administered prolactin", Journal of Endocrinology, 14 (1): 28–36, doi:10.1677/joe.0.0140028, PMID 13357678
- Emmons, D. B.; McGugan, W. A.; Elliott, J. A.; Morse, Pamela M. (March 1962), "Effect of strain of starter culture and of manufacturing procedure on bitterness and protein breakdown in cheddar cheese", Journal of Dairy Science, 45 (3): 332–342, doi:10.3168/jds.s0022-0302(62)89395-3
- Lin, Chuang-Sheng; Morse, Pamela M. (September 1975), "A compact design for spacing experiments", Biometrics, 31 (3): 661–671, Bibcode:1975Biome..31..661L, doi:10.2307/2529550, JSTOR 2529550
- Morse, Pamela M. (January 1978), "Some comments on the assessment of joint action in herbicide mixtures", Weed Science, 26 (1): 58–71, Bibcode:1978WeedS..26...58M, doi:10.1017/S0043174500032690, JSTOR 4042691, S2CID 190909267
- Sibbald, I. R.; Morse, P. M. (January 1983), "Effects of the nitrogen correction and of feed intake on true metabolizable energy values", Poultry Science, 62 (1): 138–142, doi:10.3382/ps.0620138
