= Geneviève Gauthier =

Canadian mathematician

Geneviève Gauthier is a Canadian mathematician, statistician, and decision scientist, known for her work in mathematical finance. She is a professor of statistics in the Department of Decision Sciences at HEC Montréal.

== Education and career ==
Gauthier is originally from Montreal, and earned bachelor's and master's degrees in mathematics from the Université du Québec à Montréal. One of her faculty mentors there was Alain Latour. She completed her Ph.D. in mathematics from Carleton University, under the supervision of Donald A. Dawson; her dissertation was Multilevel Bilinear System of Stochastic Differential Equations.

She became a faculty member at HEC Montréal on completing her doctorate in 1996, and was promoted to full professor there in 2008. She chaired the Department of Decision Sciences from 2013 to 2016.

== Recognition ==
In 2018 the Statistical Society of Canada selected Gauthier as the winner of the SSC Award for Impact of Applied and Collaborative Work, "for her outstanding contributions to the promotion of innovative statistical methodologies in financial engineering, and in the training of highly qualified personnel".
