= Delia North =

South African statistician

Delia North is a South African statistician and a leader in statistics education in South Africa. She is the dean of the School of Mathematics, Statistics and Computer Science at the University of KwaZulu-Natal.

North was educated at the University of Natal. She earned a bachelor's degree in mathematics and mathematical statistics with honours in mathematical statistics there, as well as a master's degree and Ph.D. in probability theory. She began her teaching career at the University of Natal in 1982, and remained with the university through its 2004 merger with the University of Durban-Westville to become the University of KwaZulu-Natal, when she became the leader of the combined statistics unit in the merged university.

She has been chair of the Education Committee of the South African Statistical Association since 2003, and she served as vice-president of the International Association for Statistical Education (the education branch of the International Statistical Institute) from 2007 to 2011.

North is an elected member of the International Statistical Institute.
