= Tatyana Krivobokova =

Kazakh statistician

Tatyana Krivobokova is a Kazakh statistician known for her work on spline estimators, with applications in biophysics and econometrics. She is University Professor for Statistics with Applications in Economics at the University of Vienna.

== Education and career ==
Krivobokova earned a diploma in applied mathematics from Al-Farabi Kazakh National University in 1996, a master's degree in applied mathematics from the University of Kaiserslautern in 2002, and a doctorate (Dr. rer. pol.) in statistics from Bielefeld University in 2007. Her dissertation, Theoretical and Practical Aspects of Penalized Spline Smoothing, was jointly supervised by Göran Kauermann and Ludwig Fahrmeir. After postdoctoral research at KU Leuven in Belgium, she joined the Bielefeld University faculty in 2008. She moved to the University of Vienna in 2020.
