= Fan Li (statistician) =

Chinese-American biostatistician

Fan Li is a Chinese-American biostatistician whose research includes causal inference and propensity score matching, and their application to comparative effectiveness research in health care. She is a professor in the Duke University Department of Statistical Science, with a secondary appointment in Duke's Department of Biostatistics and Bioinformatics.

== Education and career ==
Li studied mathematics at Peking University, graduating in 2001. Despite knowing nothing of biostatistics, she was encouraged to apply to the biostatistics program Johns Hopkins University by biostatistician Ying Qing Chen, who had recently graduated from the program. She completed her Ph.D. at Johns Hopkins in 2006. Her dissertation, Statistical Designs and Analyses for Partially Controlled Studies, was supervised by Constantine Frangakis.

After postdoctoral research at the Harvard Medical School, she joined Duke University as an assistant professor in 2008. She was promoted to associate professor in 2015 and to full professor in 2021.

Li should not be confused with another (male) statistician named Fan Li, one of her former doctoral students at Duke, who became an associate professor of biostatistics at Yale University.

== Recognition ==
Li was named as a Fellow of the American Statistical Association in 2022.
