= Anna Nevius =

American biostatistician

Anna Bruce Nevius is a retired American biostatistician who worked for many years in the Center for Veterinary Medicine of the US Food and Drug Administration, and chaired the Biopharmaceutical Section of the American Statistical Association.

== Early life and education ==
Nevius is originally from North Carolina, and graduated from high school in 1961 in Murphy, North Carolina. As a mathematics major at Carson–Newman College in Tennessee, she discovered her interest in statistics by taking a course in the subject in her senior year.

She began a doctoral program in statistics at Kansas State University, but after marrying fellow statistics student S. Edward Nevius in 1968, she left with a master's degree to follow her husband to Alaska, where he was posted from 1968 to 1970 by the United States Public Health Service. In the early 1970s, she and her husband moved to Florida, where he earned a doctorate in statistics from Florida State University.

From 1975 to 1978 she worked as an instructor and statistical consultant in mathematics and statistics at the University of Nebraska–Lincoln, where her husband had a tenure-track faculty position. After her husband moved to the Food and Drug Administration in 1979, she returned to graduate study at the University of Maryland, College Park, and completed a Ph.D. in applied statistics in 1984. Her dissertation, Techniques for Combining $2\times 2$ Contingency Tables: A Simulation Study, was supervised by C. Mitchell Dayton.

== Career and later life ==
Nevius entered government service working for the Internal Revenue Service, but soon shifted to the Center for Veterinary Medicine, where she remained for the rest of her career. She chaired the Biopharmaceutical Section of the American Statistical Association for 2009. She retired three times and was rehired twice; after her second retirement, in 2022, and her husband's death at the end of 2022, she returned to the center again in 2023 as a rehired annuitant.

== Recognition ==
Nevius was elected as a Fellow of the American Statistical Association in 2012.
