= Beatrice S. Orleans =

American Naval statistician

Beatrice Shulamit Orleans
- Born: November 7, 1918
- Died: October 22, 2011 (aged 92); Washington, D.C.
- Education: Hunter College, Columbia University
- Known for: Chief statistician in the Naval Sea Systems Command

Beatrice Shulamit Orleans (November 7, 1918 - October 22, 2011) was a statistician for the United States Navy, where she was chief statistician in the Naval Sea Systems Command.

She was elected a Fellow of the American Statistical Association in 1979.

Orleans was originally from New York City. She did her undergraduate studies at Hunter College, graduating in 1939 with an A.B., and earned a master's degree at Columbia University in statistics, circa 1944. She did additional graduate study at George Washington University, American University, and the USDA Graduate School. Prior to going to work for the Navy circa 1953, she worked for the Educational Testing Service, served as an aviation psychologist for the United States Air Force, and became head of statistics at the Air Force Human Resources Research Laboratory. She became head of the Navy's Statistical Engineering Branch in approximately 1963.

She lived to be 92 years old, and died of respiratory failure at Sibley Memorial Hospital in Washington, D.C., on October 22, 2011.
