= Sharina Person =

American biostatistician

Sharina Delores Person is an American biostatistician known for developing and directing the Diversity Engagement Survey of the Association of American Medical Colleges. She is a professor in the University of Massachusetts Chan Medical School, vice chair of the university's Department of Population and Quantitative Health Sciences, and Dr. Marcellette G. Williams Senior Scholar.

== Education and career ==
Person is African-American, and grew up with non-college-educated parents in a low-income and low-education neighborhood in Gary, Indiana. She majored in mathematics and physics at the University of Alabama at Birmingham, continuing there for a master's degree and Ph.D. in biostatistics. Her 1998 doctoral dissertation, The estimation and forecasting of incomplete stationary time series, was supervised by J. Michael Hardin.

She became a faculty member at the University of Alabama at Birmingham before moving to the University of Massachusetts.

== Recognition ==
In 2024 the University of Massachusetts Chan Medical School gave Person their Chancellor's Award for Advancing Institutional Excellence in Diversity and Inclusion. She was named as a Fellow of the American Statistical Association in 2026.
