= Anastasia Ivanova (statistician) =

Biostatistician

Anastasia V. Ivanova is a biostatistician whose research focuses on clinical trials, including applications in precision medicine, oncology, the treatment of asthma, and connections between back pain treatment and opioid addiction. Educated in Russia and the US, she is a professor in the Department of Biostatistics at the UNC Gillings School of Global Public Health, part of the University of North Carolina at Chapel Hill.

== Education and career ==
Ivanova received a master's degree in mathematics from Moscow State University in 1988, and completed a doctorate in mathematics there in 1992. Her dissertation, Stochastic Stability of Algorithms when Solving Partial Differential Equations with the Monte Carlo Method, was supervised by Sergey Yermakov. After moving to the US, she received a second Ph.D. in statistics in 1998, at the University of Maryland, Baltimore County. Her second dissertation, A Birth and Death Urn for Randomized Clinical Trials, was supervised by William F. Rosenberger.

She became an assistant professor in the Department of Epidemiology and Biostatistics at Case Western Reserve University from 1998 until 1999, when she moved to the University of North Carolina at Chapel Hill as an assistant professor in the Department of Biostatistics. She added an affiliation with the UNC Lineberger Comprehensive Cancer Center in 2001. She was promoted to associate professor in 2006 and full professor in 2018.

== Recognition ==
Ivanova was named as a Fellow of the American Statistical Association in 2020.
