= Mei-Ling Ting Lee =

Taiwanese-American biostatistician

- Born: Taipei, Taiwan
- Citizenship: American
- Education: National Taiwan University (BS); National Tsing Hua University (MS); University of Pittsburgh (MA, PhD)
- Scientific career
- Fields: Biostatistics; Epidemiology
- Workplaces: Bridgewater State College; Boston University; Harvard University; Ohio State University; University of Maryland
- Thesis: On some concepts of dependence (1980)
- Doctoral advisor: Henry W. Block

Mei-Ling Ting Lee is a Taiwanese-American biostatistician known for her research on microarrays. She is a professor of epidemiology and biostatistics at the University of Maryland, College Park, and the founding editor-in-chief of the journal Lifetime Data Analysis. She was president of the International Chinese Statistical Association for 2016.

== Education and career ==
Lee was born in Taipei, and earned bachelor's and master's degrees in mathematics from National Taiwan University in 1975 and National Tsing Hua University in 1977, respectively. She earned her PhD in statistics from the University of Pittsburgh in 1980, and became a naturalized US citizen.

She has worked on the faculty of Bridgewater State College (1983–1984), Boston University (1984–1992), the Harvard Medical School (1993–1999), the Harvard School of Public Health (2000–2005), Ohio State University (2005–2008), and the University of Maryland (since 2008). At Ohio State, she chaired the Biostatistics Division of the School of Public Health and became a Distinguished Professor in Biostatistics and Computational Biology.

== Selected publications ==
=== Books ===
- Lee, Mei-Ling Ting (2004), Analysis of Microarray Gene Expression Data, Kluwer

=== Research papers ===
- Lee, M.-L. T.; Kuo, F. C.; Whitmore, G. A.; Sklar, J. (2000), "Importance of replication in microarray gene expression studies: Statistical methods and evidence from repetitive cDNA hybridizations", Proceedings of the National Academy of Sciences, 97 (18): 9834–9839, Bibcode:2000PNAS...97.9834L, doi:10.1073/pnas.97.18.9834, PMC 27599, PMID 10963655
- Hunter, Melissa Piper; Ismail, Noura; Zhang, Xiaoli; Aguda, Baltazar D.; Lee, Eun Joo; Yu, Lianbo; Xiao, Tao; Schafer, Jeffrey; Lee, Mei-Ling Ting; Schmittgen, Thomas D.; Nana-Sinkam, S. Patrick; Jarjoura, David; Marsh, Clay B. (2008), "Detection of microRNA Expression in Human Peripheral Blood Microvesicles", PLOS ONE, 3 (11) e3694, Bibcode:2008PLoSO...3.3694H, doi:10.1371/journal.pone.0003694, PMC 2577891, PMID 19002258

== Awards and honors ==
Lee is an elected member of the International Statistical Institute since 1995 and a fellow of the Royal Statistical Society (1998), American Statistical Association (1999), and Institute of Mathematical Statistics (2005).
