= Qingzhao Yu =

Chinese-American statistician

Qingzhao Yu is a Chinese and American biostatistician at the LSU Health Sciences Center New Orleans, where she is a professor of biostatistics and associate dean for research. Her research topics include mediation analysis and applications of statistics in public health and in breast cancer survival.

== Education and career ==
Yu received a bachelor's degree in economics and a master's degree in management as a student in the business school of Wuhan University. She went to the Ohio State University for graduate study in statistics, receiving a second master's degree and completing her Ph.D. there. Her 2006 doctoral dissertation, Bayesian Synthesis, was jointly supervised by Steve MacEachern and Mario Peruggia.

She joined LSU Health Sciences Center New Orleans as an assistant professor in 2006, and was promoted to associate professor in 2012 and full professor in 2018. She chaired the biostatistics program from 2022 to 2023, and was named as associate dean for research in 2023.

== Recognition ==
Yu was named as a Fellow of the American Statistical Association in 2026.

== Personal life ==
Yu is a judge for USA Swimming and a Chinese language teacher.
