= Lulu Kang =

Chinese-American data scientist and statistician

Lulu Kang is a Chinese and American interdisciplinary data scientist and statistician whose research topics have included the design of experiments, active learning, and particle-based inference, and applications including fairness in vaccine distribution. She is an associate professor in the Department of Mathematics and Statistics at the University of Massachusetts Amherst, where she serves as director of the statistics program.

== Education and career ==
Kang studied mathematics as an undergraduate at Nanjing University, where she graduated in 2005. She continued her studies at Georgia Tech, receiving a master's degree in operations research and a Ph.D. in industrial engineering there in 2010, under the supervision of Roshan Joseph.

She joined the Illinois Institute of Technology (IIT) as an assistant professor of applied mathematics in 2010, and was promoted to associate professor in 2016. At IIT, she directed a master's program in data science from 2013 until 2021, and became director of the bachelor's program in data science in 2021. She moved to the University of Massachusetts Amherst in 2023, and became director of the statistics program in 2025.

Kang chaired the American Statistical Association Section on Physical and Engineering Sciences in 2022.

== Recognition ==
Kang received the Outstanding Service Award of the American Statistical Association Section on Physical and Engineering Sciences in 2025. She was elected as a Fellow of the American Statistical Association in 2026.
