= Michelle Shardell =

American biostatistician and epidemiologist

Michelle Denise Shardell
- Education: University of Florida (BA); University of Michigan School of Public Health (MS); Johns Hopkins Bloomberg School of Public Health (PhD)
- Known for: Research on aging and biomarkers
- Awards: Fellow of the American Statistical Association (2024); Elected Member of the International Statistical Institute (2025)
- Scientific career
- Fields: Biostatistics; Epidemiology
- Workplaces: University of Maryland School of Medicine; National Institute on Aging
- Thesis: The Analysis of Informatively Coarsened Discrete Time-to-Event Data (2005)
- Doctoral advisor: Daniel Scharfstein
- Website: University profile

Michelle Denise Shardell is an American biostatistician and epidemiologist who studies aging and the correlation between biomarkers and aging-related health outcomes. She is a professor and vice chair of research in the Department of Epidemiology & Public Health at the University of Maryland School of Medicine, and director of the school's Division of Biostatistics and Bioinformatics.

== Education and career ==
Shardell majored in mathematics at the University of Florida, graduating with high honors in 1998. After a 2000 master's degree in biostatistics from the University of Michigan School of Public Health, she continued her studies in biostatistics at the Johns Hopkins Bloomberg School of Public Health. She completed her Ph.D. in 2005 with the dissertation The Analysis of Informatively Coarsened Discrete Time-to-Event Data, supervised by Daniel Scharfstein.

She joined the University of Maryland School of Medicine in 2005 as an assistant professor in the Department of Epidemiology and Public Health. In 2014 she was tenured as an associate professor, and then went on leave as an adjunct associate professor to work as a staff scientist at the National Institute on Aging. She returned to the University of Maryland School of Medicine as a full professor in 2019. She has been vice chair for research since 2023 and director of the Division of Biostatistics and Bioinformatics since 2025.

== Recognition ==
Shardell was elected as a Fellow of the American Statistical Association in 2024. She became an Elected Member of the International Statistical Institute in 2025.
