= Elizabeth H. Slate =

American statistician

Elizabeth H. Slate is an American statistician, interested in the Bayesian statistics of longitudinal data and applications to health. She is the Duncan McLean and Pearl Levine Fairweather Professor of Statistics at Florida State University. Some of Slate's most heavily cited work concerns the effects of selenium on cancer. Slate's research has also included work on the early detection of osteoarthritis.

== Education and career ==
Slate majored in applied mathematics and computer science at Carnegie Mellon University (CMU), graduating in 1986. After earning a master's degree at CMU in statistics in 1988, she completed her Ph.D. there in 1991, under the supervision of Robert E. Kass; her dissertation was Reparameterization of Statistical Models.

She joined the School of Operations Research and Industrial Engineering at Cornell University in 1992, and moved to the department of Biostatistics, Bioinformatics and Epidemiology of the Medical University of South Carolina in 2000. In 2011 she moved again, to Florida State University, as Fairweather Professor.

== Recognition ==
Slate became a Fellow of the American Statistical Association in 2007, and a Fellow of the Institute of Mathematical Statistics in 2023.
