= Laura McKenna =

American statistician

Laura Voshell McKenna (also published as Laura Voshell and Laura Voshell Zayatz) is an American census statistician and expert on statistical disclosure control.

== Contributions ==
McKenna served as chair of the Disclosure Review Board of the United States Census Bureau from 2002 to 2016, and also headed the Center for Disclosure Avoidance Research at the Census Bureau. She served on the Committee on Privacy and Confidentiality of the American Statistical Association from 1994 to 1999. With Pat Doyle and Julia Lane, she is the co-editor of the book Confidentiality, Disclosure and Data Access: Theory and Practical Applications (North Holland, 2001).

== Recognition ==
McKenna won the Department of Commerce Silver Medal in 2003, "for developing and implementing the disclosure limitation methods used to mask data from Census 2000" and "for work as Chair of the Disclosure Review Board and as organizer of a conference on privacy and disclosure limitation". She was named a Fellow of the American Statistical Association in 2010, "for effectively moving theoretical techniques in the field of statistical disclosure control into practical application in official statistics; for leadership nationally and internationally in educating statisticians and policy officials on relevant disclosure issues, identifying new research opportunities, and developing innovative technical solutions; and for service to the statistical community".
