= Naomi D. Rothwell =

American census worker and behavioral researcher

Naomi Doniger "Donny" Rothwell (August 18, 1917 – July 12, 2000) was the chief of the Center for Survey Methods Research for the United States Census Bureau, where in the mid-1960s she began the use of behavioral research to understand census response rates. She was also the co-author of The Psychiatric Halfway House: A Case Study (with Joan M. Doniger, C. C. Thomas, 1966).

== Education and career ==
Naomi Doniger graduated in 1939 from Cornell University with a bachelor's degree in agriculture, married George James Rothwell, and soon afterwards began working for the federal government in the State Department, Army, and Department of Agriculture. In 1946 she was working in Moscow for the United States Foreign Service. She became a board member of Woodley House, a halfway house in Washington, DC, founded by her sister Joan Doniger. She and her sister recorded their experiences in their book.

By 1960, she was working at the Census Bureau, where she "had a major role in the enumerator training program" for the 1960 census. She worked at the bureau for 31 years before retiring. She also served as secretary-treasurer of the American Association for Public Opinion Research.

== Recognition ==
She was a recipient of the Department of Commerce Gold Medal. In 1981 she was elected as a Fellow of the American Statistical Association.
