= Margaret Gamalo =

Filipino-American biostatistician and drug development executive

Margaret (Meg) Gamalo-Siebers is a Filipino-American biostatistician and drug development executive specializing in inflammation and immunology. She works for Pfizer as vice president – biostatistics, global product development – inflammation and immunology, and is editor-in-chief of the Journal of Biopharmaceutical Statistics.

== Education and career ==
Gamalo earned a master's degree in applied mathematics and operations research from the University of the Philippines. She completed a Ph.D. in statistics at the University of Pittsburgh, in 2006.

She worked in the Center for Drug Evaluation and Research at the US Food and Drug Administration, and as a principal research scientist and research advisor for global statistical sciences at Eli Lilly, before taking her present position at Pfizer.

== Recognition ==
Gamalo was named as a Fellow of the American Statistical Association, in the 2023 class of fellows.
