= Margaret T. May =

British health sciences modeller

Margaret Thelma May is Professor of Medical Statistics at the University of Bristol, and specialises in prognostic modelling and HIV epidemiology. May has a B.A. in natural sciences from the University of Cambridge (1981), a PGCE in mathematics from University of Oxford (1982), and an M.Sc. (1999) and Ph.D. (2008) from the University of Bristol.

May has led studies to better understand treatment effectiveness and life expectancies of people living with HIV/AIDS. She was the main author of a study published in The Lancet in 2006 comparing HIV patients receiving highly active antiretroviral therapy (HAART) across different time periods, which showed that death rates did not significantly decline during this time period although viral levels were lowered. May suggested this was likely due to factors such as later initiation of treatment, shifts in patient demographics, and increased co-infections. In 2011, she and her colleagues at the University of Bristol published a study in The BMJ indicating that the life expectancy of a 20-year-old with HIV rose from 30 years in 1996–1999 to nearly 46 years by 2006–2008. They determined this by analyzing data from the UK Collaborative HIV Cohort study which has tracked patients at major clinical centers since 1996.

== Selected publications ==
- Egger, Matthias; May, Margaret; Chêne, Geneviève; Phillips, Andrew N; Ledergerber, Bruno; Dabis, François; Costagliola, Dominique; Monforte, Antonella D'Arminio; de Wolf, Frank; Reiss, Peter; Lundgren, Jens D; Justice, Amy C; Staszewski, Schlomo; Leport, Catherine; Hogg, Robert S; Sabin, Caroline A; Gill, M John; Salzberger, Bernd; Sterne, Jonathan AC (2002). "Prognosis of HIV-1-infected patients starting highly active antiretroviral therapy: a collaborative analysis of prospective studies". The Lancet. 360 (9327): 119–129. doi:10.1016/S0140-6736(02)09411-4.
- May, Margaret; McCarron, Peter; Stansfeld, Stephen; Ben-Shlomo, Yoav; Gallacher, John; Yarnell, John; Davey Smith, George; Elwood, Peter; Ebrahim, Shah (2002). "Does Psychological Distress Predict the Risk of Ischemic Stroke and Transient Ischemic Attack?: The Caerphilly Study". Stroke. 33 (1): 7–12. doi:10.1161/hs0102.100529. ISSN 0039-2499.
- May, M.; Sterne, J.; Costagliola, D.; Egger, M.; Sabin, C.; Phillips, A.; Justice, A.; Dabis, F.; Gill, J.; Lundgren, J.; Hogg, R.; de Wolf, F.; Fätkenheuer, G.; Staszewski, S.; d'Arminio Monfort, A.; Ledergerber, B. (2006). "HIV treatment response and prognosis in Europe and North America in the first decade of highly active antiretroviral therapy: a collaborative analysis". The Lancet. 368 (9534): 451–458. doi:10.1016/S0140-6736(06)69152-6.
- Taffé, Patrick; May, Margaret; the Swiss HIV Cohort Study (2008). "A joint back calculation model for the imputation of the date of HIV infection in a prevalent cohort". Statistics in Medicine. 27 (23): 4835–4853. doi:10.1002/sim.3294. ISSN 0277-6715.
- Sterne, J, May, M, Costagliola, D, Wolf, Fd, Phillips, A, Harris, R, Funk, M, Geskus, R, Gill, J, Dabis, F, Miro, J, Justice, A, Ledergerber, B, Fatkenheuer, G, Hogg, R, Monforte, Ad, Saag, M, Smith, C, Staszewski, S, Egger, M, Cole, S (2009). "Timing of initiation of antiretroviral therapy in AIDS-free HIV-1-infected patients: a collaborative analysis of 18 HIV cohort studies". The Lancet. 373 (9672): 1352–1363. doi:10.1016/S0140-6736(09)60612-7. PMC 2670965. PMID 19361855.
- May, Margaret; Boulle, Andrew; Phiri, Sam; Messou, Eugene; Myer, Landon; Wood, Robin; Keiser, Olivia; Sterne, Jonathan AC; Dabis, Francois; Egger, Matthias (2010). "Prognosis of patients with HIV-1 infection starting antiretroviral therapy in sub-Saharan Africa: a collaborative analysis of scale-up programmes". The Lancet. 376 (9739): 449–457. doi:10.1016/S0140-6736(10)60666-6. PMC 3138328. PMID 20638120.
- May, M.; Gompels, M.; Delpech, V.; Porter, K.; Post, F.; Johnson, M.; Dunn, D.; Palfreeman, A.; Gilson, R.; Gazzard, B.; Hill, T.; Walsh, J.; Fisher, M.; Orkin, C.; Ainsworth, J.; Bansi, L.; Phillips, A.; Leen, C.; Nelson, M.; Anderson, J.; Sabin, C. (2011). "Impact of late diagnosis and treatment on life expectancy in people with HIV-1: UK Collaborative HIV Cohort (UK CHIC) Study" (PDF). The BMJ. 343 d6016. doi:10.1136/bmj.d6016. ISSN 0959-8138. PMC 3191202. PMID 21990260.
- May, Margaret T.; Gompels, Mark; Delpech, Valerie; Porter, Kholoud; Orkin, Chloe; Kegg, Stephen; Hay, Phillip; Johnson, Margaret; Palfreeman, Adrian; Gilson, Richard; Chadwick, David; Martin, Fabiola; Hill, Teresa; Walsh, John; Post, Frank; Fisher, Martin; Ainsworth, Jonathan; Jose, Sophie; Leen, Clifford; Nelson, Mark; Anderson, Jane; Sabin, Caroline (2014). "Impact on life expectancy of HIV-1 positive individuals of CD4+ cell count and viral load response to antiretroviral therapy". AIDS. 28 (8): 1193–1202. doi:10.1097/QAD.0000000000000243. ISSN 0269-9370. PMC 4004637. PMID 24556869.
- Trickey, Adam; May, Margaret T; Vehreschild, Jorg-Janne; Obel, Niels; Gill, M John; Crane, Heidi M; Boesecke, Christoph; Patterson, Sophie; Grabar, Sophie; Cazanave, Charles; Cavassini, Matthias; Shepherd, Leah; Monforte, Antonella d'Arminio; van Sighem, Ard; Saag, Mike; Lampe, Fiona; Hernando, Vicky; Montero, Marta; Zangerle, Robert; Justice, Amy C; Sterling, Timothy; Ingle, Suzanne M; Sterne, Jonathan A C (2017). "Survival of HIV-positive patients starting antiretroviral therapy between 1996 and 2013: a collaborative analysis of cohort studies". The Lancet HIV. 4 (8): e349–e356. doi:10.1016/S2352-3018(17)30066-8. PMC 5555438. PMID 28501495.
