= Jeanne Clare Ridley =

American sociologist, statistician

Jeanne Clare Ridley (August 28, 1925 – July 17, 2007) was an American sociologist, statistician, and demographer, known for her work on fertility.

== Contributions ==
Ridley is known for her work on human reproduction and fertility, including works on the simulation of population dynamics, foundational studies on truncation in demographic data, overviews of the changing role of women in society, and a detailed survey on the fertility behavior of women born just after the turn of the 20th century.

With Mindel C. Sheps, a frequent collaborator, she edited the book Public Health and Population Change: Current Research Issues (University of Pittsburgh Press, 1965).

== Education and career ==
Ridley was born on August 28, 1925, in Scranton, Pennsylvania. She studied economics at the University of Michigan, graduating in 1947. She earned a master's degree in sociology at Columbia University in 1951, and then returned to the University of Michigan for doctoral study, completing a Ph.D. in 1958.

She worked as an assistant professor of sociology and anthropology at Vanderbilt University from 1957 to 1963, as an associate professor of sociology and demography at the University of Pittsburgh from 1963 to 1967, and as an associate professor of socio-medical sciences at Columbia University from 1967 to 1972. At Columbia, she directed the Division of Demography in the International Institute for the Study of Human Reproduction.

In 1972, she moved to Georgetown University as a professor of sociology, and remained there for the remainder of her career. At Georgetown, she was also a researcher in the Center for Population Research. She retired in 1990, becoming professor emerita of demography, and died of Parkinson's disease on July 17, 2007, in Silver Spring, Maryland.

== Recognition ==
Ridley was elected a Fellow of the American Statistical Association in 1976.
