= Nancy Spruill =

American statistician and defense acquisitions analyst

Nancy Lyon Spruill is a retired American statistician and defense acquisitions analyst, formerly the director of Acquisition Resources and Analysis in the United States Department of Defense. Within the Department of Defense, she is known for the "Spruill chart", a spreadsheet for estimating the costs of weapons programs that she developed, and for threatening to sue the United States Navy in 1979 because it would not allow her, as a woman, to stay aboard one of its aircraft carriers.

== Education and career ==
Spruill is the daughter and granddaughter of federal workers. She is a 1971 graduate of the University of Maryland, College Park, majoring in mathematics, and on graduating became a research assistant in the Center for Naval Analyses. She earned a master's degree in 1975, and completed a Ph.D. in 1980 at George Washington University, with the dissertation Two statistical problems involving the bivariate normal distribution arising from legal issues. In 1983 she moved to the office of the Secretary of Defense, eventually becoming a senior operations research analyst there. In 1993 she moved to the Defense Mapping Agency, and in 1999 she returned to the office of the secretary as director of acquisition resources and analysis. She retired in 2018.

== Recognition ==
In 2003, she was named a Fellow of the American Statistical Association. The American Statistical Association Section on Statistics in Defense and National Security gave her their Distinguished Achievement Award in 2006. She is also a recipient of the Department of Defense Distinguished Civilian Service Award, the Secretary of Defense Exceptional Civilian Service Award, the Hammer Award, the David D. Acker "Skill in Communication" Award, and the Presidential Rank Award.
