= Kate Tilling =

British medical statistician

- Born: Edinburgh, Scotland
- Citizenship: British
- Education: University of London PhD 1999
- Scientific career
- Fields: Epidemiology; Statistics
- Workplaces: King's College London (1993–2002); Johns Hopkins University School of Hygiene & Public Health (1999–2000); University of Bristol (2002–)
- Thesis: Statistical methods to study the incidence and outcome of stroke (1999)

Kate Tilling is a British statistician who specialises in developing and applying statistical methods to overcome problems encountered in epidemiological research. Tilling has been a professor in medical statistics. in population health sciences within Bristol Medical School (previously the School of Social and Community Medicine), University of Bristol, since 2011. She joined the University of Bristol in 2002 as a Senior Lecturer, following nine years as a lecturer at King's College London.

Tilling leads a programme of research within the Medical Research Council (MRC) Integrative Epidemiology Unit in Bristol and co-leads the effectiveness theme within the NIHR CLAHRC West (Collaboration for Leadership in Applied Health Research and Care West), which focus on novel statistical methods for understanding causal relationships in health research.

Tilling is a member of the MRC Methodology Research Panel and the MRC Cohort Strategy Group.

== Education ==
In 1991, Tilling received a first-class BSc with honours in mathematics from the University of Warwick. She received her MSc in Applied Statistics at the University of Oxford the following year. In 1999, Tilling received a PhD from the University of London (King's College). Her thesis was entitled Statistical methods to study the incidence and outcome of stroke.

== Research ==
After receiving her PhD, Tilling joined the Department of Public Health Sciences, King's College London as a lecturer in medical statistics in 1993. In 1999, Tilling spent time in the US as a postdoctoral fellow in chronic disease epidemiology at Johns Hopkins University School of Hygiene & Public Health. Tilling moved to the School of Social and Community Medicine at the University of Bristol in 2002 where she was appointed as senior lecturer and then reader in medical statistics. Tilling was promoted to professor of medical statistics in 2011.

Tilling's research focuses on developing and applying statistical methods to overcome issues encountered in epidemiological and health services research. One of her key interests is in modelling time-varying exposures and outcomes. Tilling has previously received funding from the MRC to develop methods for analysing time-varying data within an epigenetic setting, and funding from the NIHR to develop and apply longitudinal methods to model prostate-specific antigen (PSA) in prostate cancer, and to model progression in multiple sclerosis. She collaborates with colleagues to examine changes over time in a variety of health behaviours and outcomes, particularly during pregnancy, and childhood and adolescence, using data from the Avon Longitudinal Study of Parents and Children (ALSPAC). Tilling also has an interest in developing methods to deal with missing data and selection bias and has received funding from the MRC to develop methods for longitudinal missing data.

Within the MRC Integrative Epidemiology Unit, Tilling leads a programme of work on Statistical Methods for Improving Causal Inference. The aim of the programme is to develop methods for causal inference that are robust to missing data and can investigate change over time. These methods will enable researchers using complex observational data to draw unbiased conclusions about real world problems.

Tilling co-leads the effectiveness theme of the NIHR CLAHRC West along with Tim Peters. The effectiveness team uses large volumes of data in order to understand patterns in health and service use.
