= Stephanie Hicks =

American biostatistician and data scientist

- Born: Stephanie Carinne Hicks
- Education: Louisiana State University (B.S., Mathematics, 2007); Rice University (M.A., Statistics, 2012; Ph.D., Statistics, 2013)
- Known for: Open-source software for genomics, epigenomics, spatial transcriptomics; single-cell sequencing applications
- Awards: Myrto Lefkopoulou Distinguished Lectureship (2023) Fellow of the American Statistical Association (2025)
- Scientific career
- Fields: Biostatistics, Data science
- Workplaces: Johns Hopkins University
- Thesis: Probabilistic Models for Genetic and Genomic Data with Missing Information (2013)
- Doctoral advisor: Marek Kimmel, Sharon Plon
- Website: https://www.stephaniehicks.com/

Stephanie Carinne Hicks is an American biostatistician and data scientist whose research involves the development of open-source software for genomics, epigenomics, and spatial transcriptomics, and applications involving single-cell sequencing. She is an associate professor at Johns Hopkins University in the Department of Biostatistics in the Johns Hopkins Bloomberg School of Public Health and with the Department of Biomedical Engineering in the Whiting School of Engineering.

== Education and career ==
Hicks majored in mathematics at Louisiana State University, graduating in 2007. She continued her studies in statistics at Rice University, where she received a master's degree in 2012 and completed her Ph.D. in 2013. Her dissertation, Probabilistic Models for Genetic and Genomic Data with Missing Information, was jointly supervised by Marek Kimmel and Sharon Plon.

Next, she was a postdoctoral researcher in biostatistics and data science from 2013 to 2018, in the Dana–Farber Cancer Institute and Harvard T.H. Chan School of Public Health. Her work there was supervised by Rafael Irizarry. She became a faculty member at Johns Hopkins in 2018.

At Johns Hopkins, she founded R-Ladies Baltimore, a support group for women statistical programmers, in 2018.

== Recognition ==
Hicks was the 2023 recipient of the Myrto Lefkopoulou Distinguished Lectureship of the Harvard T.H. Chan School of Public Health. She was named as a Fellow of the American Statistical Association in 2025.
