= Nandita Mitra =

American biostatistician

Nandita Mitra is an American biostatistician, and a professor in the Department of Biostatistics and Epidemiology of the Perelman School of Medicine at the University of Pennsylvania. Her research topics include causal inference, health economics and cost-effectiveness analysis, difference in differences estimation, and statistical applications in public health and cancer research. She is editor-in-chief of Observational Studies.

== Education and career ==
Mitra majored in mathematics at Brown University, graduating in 1992. After a 1996 master's degree in biostatistics at the University of California, Berkeley, she completed a PhD in biostatistics at Columbia University in 2001. Her dissertation, Analyzing Data From Non-Randomized Studies Using Propensity Score Methodology, was supervised by Daniel F. Heitjan.

She became a postdoctoral fellow at the Harvard T.H. Chan School of Public Health and a faculty member at the Memorial Sloan Kettering Cancer Center before moving to the University of Pennsylvania in 2005.

Mitra is editor-in-chief of Observational Studies, an open-access journal published by the University of Pennsylvania. She was the 2023 chair of the American Statistical Association Section on Statistics in Epidemiology.

== Recognition ==
Mitra was named as a Fellow of the American Statistical Association in 2019.

She was the 2024 recipient of the L. Adrienne Cupples Award for Excellence in Teaching, Research, and Service in Biostatistics, given by the Boston University School of Public Health.
