= Benmei Liu =

Chinese-American statistician

Benmei Liu is a Chinese and American statistician specializing in survey methodology for the National Cancer Institute, and the 2025–2026 president of the Washington Statistical Society.

== Education and career ==
Liu studied mathematics at the Ocean University of China in Qingdao, where she received a master's degree in 1999. She came to the US for graduate study in statistics at the University of Nebraska–Lincoln, where she received a second master's degree in 2001. She completed a Ph.D. in survey methodology at the University of Maryland, College Park in 2009. Her doctoral dissertation, Hierarchical Bayes Estimation and Empirical Best Prediction of Small Area Proportions, was supervised by Partha Lahiri.

After working for Westat, Liu joined the National Cancer Institute in 2009. There, she has worked as a survey statistician and program director in the Division of Cancer Control and Population Sciences, and in the Statistical Research and Applications Branch of the Surveillance Research Program.

She was elected as president of the Washington Statistical Society for the 2024–2025 term as president-elect and for the 2025–2026 term as president.

== Recognition ==
Liu received the 2022 Presidents’ Award for outstanding service of the Washington Statistical Society. She was elected as a Fellow of the American Statistical Association in its 2026 class of fellows.
