= Xinyuan Song =

Chinese statistician

Xinyuan Song (Chinese: 宋心遠) is a Chinese statistician known for her research on structural equation modeling and latent variables in Bayesian statistics. With Sik-Yum Lee, she is a coauthor of the book Basic and Advanced Bayesian Structural Equation Modeling: With Applications in the Medical and Behavioral Sciences (Wiley, 2012).

Song has a bachelor's degree from Xiangtan University, a master's degree from Sun Yat-sen University, and a PhD from the Chinese University of Hong Kong, where she is a professor. Her 2001 doctoral dissertation, Bayesian Analysis for Complex Structural Equation Models, was supervised by Sik-Yum Lee.

Song was named as an Elected Member of the International Statistical Institute in 2023, and as a Fellow of the Institute of Mathematical Statistics in 2024. She is the 2024 recipient of the President's Citation Award of the International Chinese Statistical Association.
