= Estelle Russek-Cohen =

American biostatistician

Estelle Russek-Cohen (also published as Estelle Russek) is an American biostatistician and expert on biometrics. Formerly a professor at the University of Maryland, College Park and division director in the Center for Biologics Evaluation and Research or the Food and Drug Administration, she has retired to become a statistical consultant.

== Education and career ==
Russek-Cohen graduated from Stony Brook University in 1972, with a double major in biology and mathematics. She completed her Ph.D. in biostatistics at the University of Washington in 1979. Her dissertation was entitled Overspecification in linear discriminant analysis.

She joined the faculty of the University of Maryland as an assistant professor in 1978, affiliated with the university's Department of Animal Sciences and Department of Microbiology. She eventually became full professor and director of the university's program in biometrics. She moved to the Food and Drug Administration in 2004, initially with the FDA Center for Devices and Radiological Health. In 2010 she became deputy division director for biostatistics in the Center for Biologics Evaluation and Research, and in 2014 she became division director. She left federal service in 2020 and has been principal of a consulting firm since.

== Recognition ==
In 1997, the University of Maryland's College of Agriculture and Natural Resources gave Russek-Cohen their Excellence in Instruction Award. Russek-Cohen was named a Fellow of the American Statistical Association in 2010.
