= Alison Motsinger-Reif =

American statistical geneticist

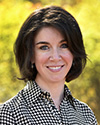
- Motsinger-Reif in 2019
- Education: Vanderbilt University
- Scientific career
- Fields: Biostatistics, human genetics
- Workplaces: North Carolina State University; National Institute of Environmental Health Sciences

Alison Anne Motsinger-Reif is an American biostatistician and human geneticist specialized in association analyses, big data, and genomic analyses. In December 2018, she became the chief of the biostatistics and computational biology branch at the National Institute of Environmental Health Sciences. Montsinger-Reif was previously a professor of statistics at the North Carolina State University.

== Life ==
Motsinger-Reif was a lab technician in the department of physiology and pharmacology at Wake Forest University from 1997 to 2000. Her advisor was James E. Smith. She worked as a research assistant with Derya Unutmaz at Vanderbilt University from 2000 to 2003. She earned a B.S. in Biological Sciences (2002), M.S. in Applied Statistics (2006) and Ph.D. in Human Genetics (2007) at Vanderbilt University studying with Marylyn Ritchie.

She held varying faculty roles at North Carolina State University from 2007 to 2018 including professor of statistics and biostatistics core director. On December 10, 2018, she joined National Institute of Environmental Health Sciences (NIEHS) as chief of the Biostatistics & Computational Biology Branch. Her group focuses on the development and application of modern statistical approaches for understanding the etiology of common, complex diseases. Her lab also applies statistical approaches to evolution where she develops tree models and algorithms to detect discovery rates. She conducts association analyses looking at large-scale genetics and genomics data to find genetic factors that predict complex disease, and responses to drugs and environmental chemicals.
