= Jaya Satagopan =

Indian-American biostatistician

Jaya Mathangi Satagopan is an Indian and American biostatistician and epidemiologist whose research applies statistical genetics in understanding the genetic risk factors for cancer. She is a professor in the Department of Biostatistics and Epidemiology at Rutgers University, a member of the Cancer Prevention and Control Program at the Rutgers Cancer Institute of New Jersey, and Associate Dean for Faculty Affairs in the Rutgers School of Public Health.

== Education and career ==
Satagopan received a bachelor's degree in mathematics from the University of Madras in 1988, a master's degree in statistics from the Indian Statistical Institute in 1990, and a Ph.D. in statistics from the University of Wisconsin in 1995. Her doctoral dissertation, A Markov Chain Monte Carlo Approach to Detect Polygene Loci for Complex Traits, was supervised by Brian Yandell. She received a second master's degree, in science communication and public engagement, from the University of Edinburgh, in 2019.

She worked as a biostatistician at the Memorial Sloan Kettering Cancer Center in New York City from 1995 until 2019, also holding a courtesy appointment in biostatistics at Weill Cornell Medicine from 2009 to 2019. In 2019, she moved to Rutgers University as a full professor. At Rutgers, she was appointed as interim associate dean in 2020 and as associate dean in 2021.

== Recognition ==
Satagopan was elected as a Fellow of the American Statistical Association, in the 2015 class of fellows. She is also a Fellow of the International Genetic Epidemiology Society, elected in 2019.
