= Leslie McClure =

American biostatistician

- Born: Suffern, NY, US

Academic background
- Education: BS, Mathematics, 1995, University of Kansas; MS, Preventive Medicine and Environmental Health, 1997, University of Iowa; PhD, Biostatistics, 2004, University of Michigan
- Thesis: Analysis of clinical trials when treatments favor different outcomes. (2004)

Leslie Ain McClure is an American biostatistician. She is a Full professor of biostatistics at the Drexel University School of Public Health and was the inaugural Associate Director of Diversity for the Statistical and Applied Mathematical Sciences Institute (2017–18).

== Early life and education ==
McClure was born Suffern, New York, and raised in Overland Park, Kansas. She earned her Bachelor of Science degree in Mathematics from the University of Kansas. During high school, she was a member of the marching band which she credits for teaching her a work/life balance. Upon completing her Bachelor of Science degree, McClure enrolled at the University of Iowa for her Master's degree in Preventive Medicine and Environmental Health and then University of Michigan for her PhD in Biostatistics.

== Career ==
Upon completing her PhD, McClure joined the faculty in the Department of Biostatistics at the University of Alabama at Birmingham (UAB). During her tenure at the institution, she collaborated with Nalini Sathiakumar to better understand the relationship between environmental conditions observed from space and the health effects experienced on Earth. She used satellite data to measure particulate matter, ozone, and other environmental exposures, which she then used to track the effects of air quality. In 2014, McClure was invited to join the inaugural Edge of Chaos Scholars program which deals with "problems that defy easy or obvious solutions." The following year, she published a paper using data from the Reasons for Geographic and Racial Differences in Stroke (REGARDS) study which found that second hand smoke led to an increased risk of stroke by 30 percent.

After spending 11 years at UAB, McClure left the institution to become the Chair of the Department of Epidemiology and Biostatistics at the Drexel University Dornsife School of Public Health. At Drexel, McClure leads the Data Coordinating Center for the AJ Drexel Autism Institute's Connecting the Dots Study and is the PI for the Coordinating Center for the CDC-sponsored Diabetes LEAD Network. In 2017, she was appointed the inaugural Associate Director of Diversity for the Statistical and Applied Mathematical Sciences Institute., a position she held for a year. She is also the Chairperson of the Board of Directors for the National Alliance for Doctoral Studies in Mathematical Sciences.

During the COVID-19 pandemic, McClure was elected a Fellow of the Society for Clinical Trials. She is also a Fellow of the American Heart Association (Epidemiology Council) and a Fellow of the American Statistical Association. McClure was also the recipient of the Janet L. Norwood Award for Outstanding Achievement by a Woman in Statistical Sciences.

== Personal life ==
McClure writes a blog called Stat Girl.
