= Jian-Jian Ren =

American statistician

Joan Jian-Jian Ren (Chinese: 任建建) is an American statistician whose research concerns survival analysis and longitudinal data analysis for biomedical applications. She is a professor of mathematics at the University of Maryland, College Park.

== Education and career ==
Ren grew up in Beijing, and majored in mathematics at Peking University, graduating in 1982. After studying for a master's degree at the University of Montana, she completed a Ph.D. in 1990 at the University of North Carolina at Chapel Hill. Her dissertation, On Hadamard Differentiability and M-Estimation in Linear Models, was supervised by Pranab K. Sen.

After earning her Ph.D., Ren was on the faculty of the mathematics department at the University of Nebraska–Lincoln from 1990 to 1997. She held positions at Tulane University and the University of Central Florida before moving to the University of Maryland in 2011.

== Recognition ==
Ren was named to the 2022 class of Fellows of the Institute of Mathematical Statistics, for "innovative and significant contributions to statistical methodology, especially in nonparametric likelihood inference, survival analysis and resampling methods, and for long-lasting and dedicated professional service".

== Legal issues and controversies ==
=== UCF Lawsuit ===
The Jian-Jian Ren vs. University of Central Florida Lawsuit is a legal case involving a dispute between Dr. Jian-Jian Ren, a former faculty member, and the University of Central Florida (UCF). Dr. Ren initiated legal proceedings against UCF, asserting violations of Title VII, the Florida Civil Rights Act, and the Florida Educational Equity Act, specifically alleging gender discrimination and retaliation as grounds for her failure to receive a promotion.

The case was reviewed by the United States District Court, M.D. Florida, Orlando Division. The court ruled in favor of the defendant, University of Central Florida Board of Trustees, granting their motion for summary judgment. The court cited Ren's failure to establish a Prima Facie Case as the reason for denying all other pending motions.

Subsequently, Ren appealed the district court's decision to the U.S. Court of Appeals. However, the Circuit Court upheld the district court's conclusion, finding no error in the application of summary judgment. This legal saga highlights the complexities and legal intricacies surrounding discrimination and retaliation claims within academic institutions.
