= Ulrike Grömping =

German statistician

Ulrike Grömping is a German statistician known for her work on regression analysis with variable importance, and for her R package relaimpo for performing linear regression with relative importance. She is Professor for Applied Statistics and Business Mathematics at the Berliner Hochschule für Technik.

== Education and career ==
Grömping studied statistics at the Technical University of Dortmund, earning a diploma there in 1991. She completed her Ph.D. in statistics there in 1996. Her dissertation, Tests for a Monotone Dose-Response Relation in Models with Ordered Categorical Dose with Emphasis on Likelihood Ratio Tests for Linear Inequalities on Normal Means, was supervised by Siegfried Schach.

After working as a statistician for the Ford Motor Company in Cologne from 1997 to 2004, Grömping returned to academia as a professor at the Technische Fachhochschule Berlin (now the Berliner Hochschule für Technik) in 2004.
