= Rui Song =

Chinese-American statistician

Rui Song is a Chinese-American statistician. Her research interests include machine learning, causal inference, and independence screening for variable selection, with applications to precision medicine and economics. She works for Amazon as a senior principal scientist.

== Education and career ==
Song studied mathematics and statistics at Peking University, graduating in 2001. She completed her Ph.D. in statistics at the University of Wisconsin–Madison in 2006. Her dissertation, Inference for Change-Point Transformation Models, was supervised by Michael R. Kosorok.

After postdoctoral research in biostatistics at the University of North Carolina at Chapel Hill and in operations research and financial engineering at Princeton University, she became an assistant professor of statistics at Colorado State University in 2009. She moved to North Carolina State University in 2012, earned tenure there as an associate professor in 2016, and was promoted to full professor in 2020. She moved to Amazon in 2022.

== Recognition ==
In 2021, Song was named a Fellow of the Institute of Mathematical Statistics, "for significant contributions to machine learning methods, dynamic treatment regime, and efficient and non-standard statistical inference". In the same year she was also named a Fellow of the American Statistical Association. She was elected treasurer of the ASA Nonparametric program in 2021.
