= Sherry Towers =

American-Canadian statistician and data scientist

- Citizenship: Canadian and American
- Education: Simon Fraser University
- Alma mater: Carleton University
- Known for: Study of the contagion effect of mass shootings, disease modeling
- Scientific career
- Fields: Visual analytics, risk analysis, data mining, computational modeling
- Thesis: A Study of decays of the tau lepton with charged kaons (2000)
- Doctoral advisor: Dean Karlen
- Website: Official website

Sherry Towers is an American and Canadian statistician and data scientist. She works as an independent consultant and an affiliate scholar with the Institute for Advanced Sustainability Studies in Potsdam, Germany following a seven year position as a faculty research associate at Arizona State University. Towers is perhaps best known for her study of the contagion effect of mass shootings. She is also the founder and owner of Towers Consulting LLC, a consulting company that provides visual analytics, data mining, applied statistics, and computational modeling services to industry, academia, and the public sectors.

== Education ==
Towers earned a B.Sc in Physics at Simon Fraser University in Burnaby, Canada. She then earned a PhD in Physics at Carleton University in 2000. Her doctoral dissertation, A Study of decays of the tau lepton with charged kaons, was supervised by Dean Karlen. In 2010, Towers earned an M.S. in Applied Statistics from Purdue University in West Lafayette, IN.

== Career and research ==
Towers worked as a research scientist at the State University of New York at Stony Brook, developing advanced machine learning techniques from 2000 to 2005. Following this position she started Towers Consulting LLC (2007) and worked as a postdoctoral research associate at Purdue University, modeling the spread of pandemic influenza. From 2012 to 2017 she served as a faculty research associate at the Simon A. Levin Mathematical, Computational and Modeling Sciences Center, at Arizona State University. She modeled the dynamics of social systems, including modeling the spread of panic in a population, developed predictive crime analytics, and studied attitudes toward gun control. She is best known for her work showing the contagious effects of mass shootings. She currently is an independent consultant and an affiliate scholar at the Institute for Advanced Sustainability Studies, and works on a variety of research topics, including election violence, the spread of political and partisan sentiments in a society, social media analytics, and the COVID-19 pandemic.

== Selected publications ==
- "Beyond Ebola: Lessons to mitigate future pandemics, 2015"
- "Contagion in mass killings and school shootings, 2015"
- "Estimate of the reproduction number of the 2015 Zika virus outbreak in Barranquilla, Colombia, and estimation of the relative role of sexual transmission, 2016"
- "Quantifying the relative effects of environmental and direct transmission of norovirus, 2018"
