= Valérie Chavez-Demoulin =

Swiss statistician

Valérie Chavez-Demoulin is a Swiss statistician whose research includes statistical models of extreme events and their application to risk management. She is a professor of statistics at HEC Lausanne.

== Education and career ==
Chavez-Demoulin studied mathematics and statistics at the École Polytechnique Fédérale de Lausanne, earning a master's degree there before completing her Ph.D. in 1999. Her dissertation, Two Problems in Environmental Statistics: Capture-Recapture Analysis and Smooth Extremal Models, concerned environmental statistics, and was supervised by Anthony C. Davison.

After postdoctoral research with the Swiss Federal Institute for Forest, Snow and Landscape Research (WSL) at the WSL Institute for Snow and Avalanche Research (SLF) in Davos, she became a researcher at ETH Zurich and a hedge fund manager before taking her present position at HEC Lausanne.

== Recognition ==
Chavez-Demoulin is an Elected Member of the International Statistical Institute.
