= Yingqi Zhao =

Chinese-American biostatistician

Yingqi Zhao is a Chinese and American biostatistician, and a professor of biostatistics at the Fred Hutchinson Cancer Center in Seattle, Washington. Her research focuses on the use of statistical learning methods in personalized medicine and dynamic treatment regimes, especially for cancer screening, immunotherapy, diabetes, and childhood obesity.

== Education and career ==
Zhao has a 2006 bachelor's degree in statistics from Wuhan University, and a 2012 Ph.D. in biostatistics from the University of North Carolina at Chapel Hill.

Along with her position at the Fred Hutchinson Cancer Center, she is also an affiliate professor in biostatistics at the University of Washington.

== Recognition ==
Zhao was a 2010 recipient of the Statistics in Epidemiology Young Investigator Award of the American Statistical Association Statistics in Epidemiology Section. She was the 2020 recipient of the James E. Grizzle Distinguished Alumni Award of the UNC Gillings School of Global Public Health. She was elected as a Fellow of the American Statistical Association in 2026.
