= Eun Sug Park =

American statistician

Eun Sug Park is an American statistician who works as a senior research scientist in the Texas A&M Transportation Institute. She is known for her research on the statistics of traffic safety, and on whether public transportation reduces air pollution, as well as for her book on traffic simulation.

== Education and career ==
Park earned bachelor's and master's degrees at Seoul National University in 1990 and 1992, respectively. She completed a doctorate in statistics at Texas A&M University in 1997. Her dissertation, Multivariate Receptor Modeling from a Statistical Science Viewpoint, was supervised by Clifford Spiegelman. She became a member of the Texas A&M Transportation Institute in 2001.

== Book ==
With Clifford Spiegelman and Laurence R. Rilett, Park is a co-author of the book Transportation Statistics and Microsimulation (CRC Press, 2016).

== Recognition ==
Park won the Patricia F. Waller Award of the Transportation Research Board in 2009, for her work with Kay Fitzpatrick on pedestrian safety, and the D. Grant Mickle Award of the TRB in 2011 for her work with Fitzpatrick, Susan Chrysler, and Vichika Iragavarapu on the visibility of crosswalk indicators.

In 2019 she was elected as a Fellow of the American Statistical Association. She is also an Elected Member of the International Statistical Institute.
