= Valentina Escott-Price =

Russian statistician and professor

- Born: Soviet Union
- Education: St.Petersburg University; Cardiff University
- Scientific career
- Workplaces: Cardiff University
- Thesis: (2001)

Valentina Escott-Price is a Russian statistician and professor who specialises in biostatistics and genetic epidemiology. Escott-Price is a Professor at the MRC Centre for Neuro‑Psychiatric Genetics and Genomics at Cardiff University. Her research focuses on using advances in technology and large‑scale datasets to identify genetic risk factors and biological pathways involved in complex disorders, and on applying integrative analytical approaches to add biological insight to genetic findings.

== Early life and education ==
Escott-Price is from the Soviet Union. She studied mathematics at Saint Petersburg State University in 1991. Escott-Price completed in her doctorate in statistics at the School of Mathematics at Cardiff University. After completing her thesis, she developed a database for a schizophrenia research team. During her spare time she volunteered to do some genetic data analysis. Her early work focused on schizophrenia, bipolar disorder and depression.

== Research and career ==
Escott-Price began her academic career as a Research Assistant in the School of Mathematics at Cardiff University. In 2003, she was appointed Lecturer in Biostatistics and Genetic Epidemiology in the Bioinformatics and Biostatistics Unit at the School of Medicine. She was awarded a RCUK Research Fellowship in 2005. She joined the MRC Centre for Neuro‑Psychiatric Genetics and Genomics in 2010. In 2016, Escott-Price was promoted to Professor.

Escott-Price focuses on the use of large‑scale genomic datasets and modern analytical methods to identify genetic risk factors and biological pathways involved in psychiatric and neurological disorders. She analyses large genome‑wide, exome and sequencing datasets from cohorts comprising tens of thousands of individuals. Advances in computational methods have created opportunities for applying machine learning to improve risk prediction and gene discovery, including through federated learning and multi‑omic integration.

As a member of the International Genomics of Alzheimer's Project, Escott-Price identified 11 new susceptibility loci for Alzheimer's disease and two additional Alzheimer's‑associated genes. She examines the genetic architecture of neurodegenerative diseases, including the evaluation of polygenic risk for Alzheimer's and Parkinson's disease and the relationship between individual polygenic risk scores and disease susceptibility.

== Selected publications ==
- Ehrenreich, Hannelore; Bruggeman, Richard; Agartz, Ingrid; Pers, Tune H. (2014). "Biological insights from 108 schizophrenia-associated genetic loci". Nature. 511 (7510): 421–7. Bibcode:2014Natur.511..421S. doi:10.1038/nature13595. PMC 4112379. PMID 25056061. Wikidata Q24561833.
- Lambert, Jean-Charles; Ibrahim-Verbaas, Carla; Harold, Denise; et al. (2013). "Meta-analysis of 74,046 individuals identifies 11 new susceptibility loci for Alzheimer's disease". Nature Genetics. 45 (12): 1452–1458. doi:10.1038/ng.2802. PMC 3896259. PMID 24162737. Wikidata Q22251067.
- Harold, Denise; Richard Abraham; Hollingworth, Paul; et al. (2009). "Genome-wide association study identifies variants at CLU and PICALM associated with Alzheimer's disease". Nature Genetics. 41 (10): 1088–93. doi:10.1038/ng.440. PMC 2845877. PMID 19734902. Wikidata Q24612662. (Erratum: doi:10.1038/ng0613-712a, Wikidata Q56769759)
