= Hollylynne Lee =

American mathematics educator

Hollylynne Stohl Lee (also published as Hollylynne Stohl and Hollylynne Stohl Drier) is an American mathematics educator and statistics educator who describes herself as an "educational designer" focusing on technology-based learning. She is a professor of mathematics education in the College of Education at North Carolina State University, where she directs the Hub for Innovation and Research in Statistics Education in the William and Ida Friday Institute for Educational Innovation.

== Education and career ==
Lee graduated from Pennsylvania State University in 1991 with a bachelor's degree in secondary mathematics education. After earning a master's degree from the College of William and Mary in 1995, she completed a doctorate in mathematics education at the University of Virginia in 2000. Her dissertation, Children's Probabilistic Reasoning with a Computer Microworld, was supervised by Joe Garofalo.

While a student, she also worked as a mathematics and statistics teacher at the elementary school, middle school, and high school levels from 1992 to 2000. After completing her Ph.D., she became an assistant professor of mathematics education at North Carolina State University in 2000. She was promoted to full professor in 2013.

== Recognition ==
In 2020, Lee was elected as a Fellow of the American Statistical Association. She has also won the University of North Carolina Board of Governors 2020 Award for Excellence in Teaching and the 2022 Robert Foster Cherry Award. As of 2025, she is serving on the Mathematical Education Science Board for a term of three years.
