= Linda Williams Pickle =

American statistician

Linda Williams Pickle (born July 19, 1948) is an American statistician and expert in spatial analysis and data visualization, especially as applied to disease patterns. She worked as a researcher for the National Cancer Institute, for Georgetown University, and for the National Center for Health Statistics before becoming a statistics consultant and adjunct professor of geography and public health services at Pennsylvania State University.

== Education and career ==
Pickle was born in Hampton Virginia but grew up in central Maryland. She attended Harford Community College and then transferred to Johns Hopkins University where she majored in quantitative studies. She graduated in their first co-educational class in 1974 with honors (Phi Beta Kappa), and then completed a Ph.D. in biostatistics at Johns Hopkins in 1977.

She worked as a biostatistician at the National Cancer Institute (NCI) from 1977 to 1988, analyzing environmental epidemiology studies and producing the second generation of NCI cancer atlases that included modeled time trend maps. She then served as an adjunct assistant professor and research associate professor of community and family medicine at Georgetown University from 1983 to 1991, where she directed the biostatistics unit of the Vincent T. Lombardi Cancer Research Center from 1988 to 1991.

She was a mathematical statistician at the National Center for Health Statistics from 1991 to 1999, and was project director for the center's Atlas of United States Mortality project which included cognitive research into how people read data from maps. She returned to the National Cancer Institute as a senior mathematical statistician from 1999 to 2007, before retiring to become owner and chief statistician of a consulting firm, StatNet Consulting. While at NCI, she started their geographic information systems (GIS) program and developed statistical models to examine spatial patterns of cancer. Her model to predict the number of new cancer cases is used by the American Cancer Society for their annual cancer report.

== Books ==
Pickle is lead author of the books Atlas of U.S. Cancer Mortality Among Whites, 1950-1980 (National Cancer Institute, 1987), Atlas of U.S. Cancer Mortality Among Nonwhites, 1950-1980 (National Cancer Institute, 1990), Atlas of United States Mortality (National Center for Health Statistics, 1996) and coauthor of Visualizing Data Patterns with Micromaps with Daniel B. Carr (Chapman & Hall/CRC, 2010). In addition, she has published over 100 articles and numerous book chapters in the medical and statistical literature. Her work has been cited over 11,000 times.

== Recognition ==
Pickle's 1996 Atlas received the International Blue Pencil Award for Best Illustrated Book in 1997 from the National Association of Government Communicators and a CDC Health Communications Award the same year. In 1997 she also received the Elijah White Memorial Award from the National Center for Health Statistics. In 2006 she received the ESRI Vision Award for her pioneering work applying GIS to health. Pickle was elected as a Fellow of the American Statistical Association in 2000.
