= Karen R. Ryberg =

American hydrologist and statistician

Karen R. Ryberg is an American hydrologist and environmental statistician whose research has included studies on pesticide pollution in streams and rivers, and the effects of climate change on the size and frequency of floods. Formerly a research statistician and deputy director at the USGS Dakota Water Science Center, she retired in 2025.

Ryberg majored in mathematics at Luther College (Iowa), graduating in 1995. She received a master's degree in statistics from Colorado State University in 2006, and completed a Ph.D. in environmental and conservation science at North Dakota State University in 2015. She worked with the United States Geological Survey, in its Dakota Water Science Center, beginning in 2001 and rising to the level of deputy director in 2022. She retired from the USGS in 2025, as part of the 2025 U.S. federal deferred resignation program.

She was a chapter author on the 2023 National Climate Assessment, and an invited speaker at STAHY 2023, the 13th International Workshop on Statistical Hydrology.
