= Polly Phipps =

American sociologist

Polly A. Phipps is an American sociologist and social statistician. She is a Senior Survey Methodologist in the Office of Survey Methods Research of the US Bureau of Labor Statistics. She has also collaborated with several societies of mathematicians to survey the employment of recent doctorates in mathematics.

== Education and career ==
Phipps is originally from Spokane, Washington. She has a bachelor's degree, master's degree, and Ph.D. in sociology, from the University of Washington, Vanderbilt University, and University of Michigan respectively. At the University of Michigan, Phipps' doctoral research included studying the inroads made by women into previously male-dominated careers in pharmacy and insurance; her 1989 dissertation was Sex segregation and the changing sex composition of insurance adjusters and examiners. She joined the Bureau of Labor Statistics in the late 1980s.

== Recognition ==
In 2006–2007, the Washington Statistical Society gave Phipps their President's Award. She was elected as a Fellow of the American Statistical Association in 2013.
