= Yan Yu (statistician) =

Chinese-American statistician and marketing scientist

Yan Yu is a Chinese and American statistician and marketing scientist whose research interests include nonlinear regression analysis, statistical finance, data privacy, and the prediction of bankruptcy. She is the Joseph S. Stern Professor of Business Analytics in the Carl H. Lindner College of Business of the University of Cincinnati.

After a 1993 bachelor's degree from the University of Science and Technology of China and a 1995 master's degree in applied mathematics from Texas A&M University, Yu completed her Ph.D. in statistics at Cornell University in 2000. Her doctoral dissertation, Penalized Spline Estimation for Partially Linear Single Index Models, was supervised by David Ruppert.

Yu was named as a Fellow of the American Statistical Association in 2018.
