= Veillette =

Veillette and Veillet may refer to:

== Surnames ==
- Alfred Veillet (1882–1958), a French painter
- Doris Veillette (1935–2019), a Quebec journalist and feminist
- Georges W. Veillette (1918-1993), renowned businessman in the mattress industry in Saint-Narcisse, Canada
- Guillaume Veillet (born 1975), French researcher in ethnomusicology and music journalist
- Jean Veillet (1664–1741), French and Canadian ancestor of all the Veillet/te(s) of America
- Jean Veillet (1901–1985), a French doctor part of the French Resistance in WWII, mayor of Dijon, and president of the general council of Côte-d'Or, France
- Jean-Baptiste Veillet-Dufrêche (1838–1892), a French politician
- Jeffrey Veillet (1881–1946), businessman and mayor in Sainte-Thècle, Quebec, Canada
- Joe Veillette (born 1946), American luthier and musician
- Martin Veillette (born 1936), Quebec (Canada) theologian, philosopher, sociologist, and teacher
- Michel Veillette (born 1939), Canadian politician in Quebec
- Omer Veillette (1896-1970), founding president of Veillette Transport and mayor of La Tuque, Quebec, Canada

== Toponyms ==
- Centre des loisirs Michel-Veillette, a recreational center in Pointe-du-Lac, Trois-Rivières, Quebec, Canada
- Calvaire de la Rivière-à-Veillet, a crucifix shrine in Sainte-Geneviève-de-Batiscan, in Mauricie, Quebec, Canada
- Parc René-Veillet, in the district of Greenfield Park, Longueuil, Quebec, Canada
- Parc Roland-Veillet, in Val-d'Or, Abitibi, Quebec, Canada
- Lake Veillette, in Lac-aux-Sables, in Mauricie, Quebec, Canada
- Veillet River (French: Rivière à Veillet), in Sainte-Geneviève-de-Batiscan, Mauricie, Quebec, Canada

== Other uses ==
- Association des Veillet/te d'Amérique (Veillette Family Association of America), a non-profit organization established in 1986 dedicated to historical and genealogical research
- 16984 Veillet, an asteroid of the asteroid belt between Mars and Jupiter
- Hôtel Veillet-Dufrêche, a mansion located at Moncontour (Côtes-d'Armor), in the department of Côtes-d'Armor, in France
