= Jane F. Gentleman =

American-Canadian statistician (1940–2023)

Jane Forer Gentleman
- Born: Jane Forer; 1940; Washington, DC, USA
- Died: 2023 (aged 82–83)
- Citizenship: American, Canadian
- Occupation: Statistician
- Years active: 1962–2015
- Known for: health surveys
- Parent: Joseph Forer
- Awards: Janet L. Norwood Award, University of Waterloo Faculty of Math Alumni Achievement Medal

Academic background
- Education: University of Waterloo; University of Chicago
- Thesis: A Statistical Analysis of Mortality Data for Smokers and Nonsmokers, and for Males and Females (1973)
- Doctoral advisor: William F. Forbes

Jane Forer Gentleman (1940 – February 7, 2023) was an American-Canadian statistician, the second female president (after Agnes M. Herzberg) of the Statistical Society of Canada, and the first winner of the Janet L. Norwood Award For Outstanding Achievement By A Woman In The Statistical Sciences.

== Background ==
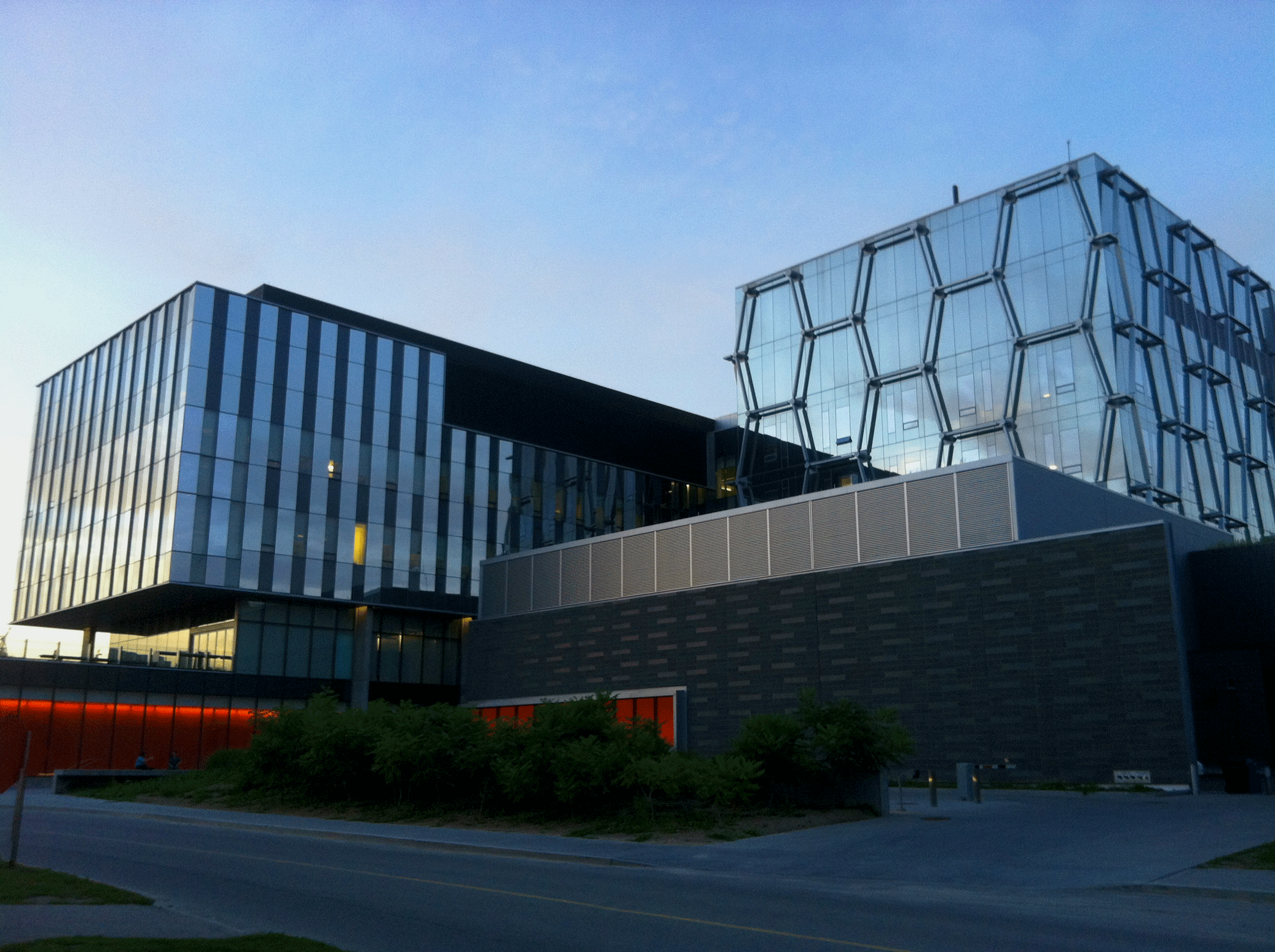
Gentleman studied and then taught at the University of Waterloo (here, the Mike & Ophelia Lazaridis Quantum-Nano Centre).

Jane F. Gentleman was born Jane Forer in 1940 in Washington, DC. She was the daughter of Joseph Forer, an American attorney known for his progressive stances on segregation and political discrimination, and Florence Roberts, a public school teacher and viola player. She received a BA in Mathematics (1962) and MS in Statistics (1965) from the University of Chicago. In 1973, she completed a doctorate in statistics at the University of Waterloo. Her dissertation was A Statistical Analysis of Mortality Data for Smokers and Nonsmokers, and for Males and Females.

== Career ==
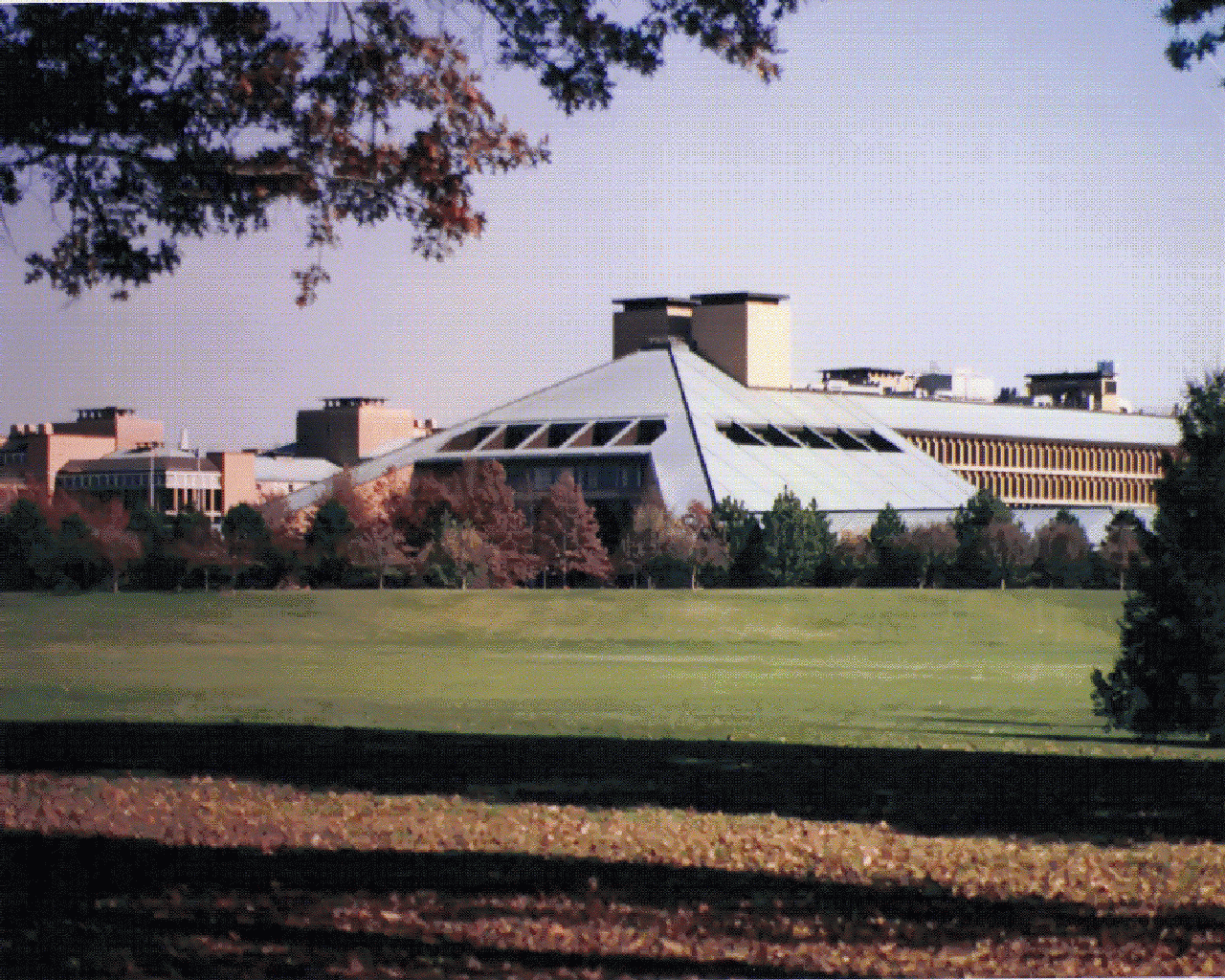
In the mid-1960s, Gentleman worked at Bell Laboratories in Murray Hill, New Jersey.

In 1962, Gentleman started her career as a statistical programmer at the University of Chicago's Economics department and School of Business. In 1965, she conducted research as an associate member of technical staff at Bell Laboratories (AT&T) in Murray Hill, New Jersey through 1968. In 1968, she worked for a year as a statistical programmer in the Department of Mathematics at the Imperial College in London.

From 1969 to 1984, Gentleman moved to the Department of Statistics at the University of Waterloo, where she taught statistics and became a tenured Associate Professor. In 1982, she became a senior research statistician for Statistics Canada, which provides the national government with social and economic statistics. In 1991, she became chief of the Health Status and Vital Statistics section and also, starting in 1996, editor-in-chief of Health Reports. In 1997, she became assistant director of Analytic Methods through 1999.

In 1999, Gentleman moved to the National Center for Health Statistics (NCHS), part of the Centers for Disease Control and Prevention (CDC) in Hyattsville, Maryland, where she served as director of Health Interview Statistics until her retirement in 2014.

From 1983 to 1985, Gentleman served as president of the Caucus for Women in Statistics. From 1988 to 1990, she served as vice president of the American Statistical Association. From 1993-1995, she served as council member of the International Statistical Institute. From 1996 to 1998, she served as president of the Statistical Society of Canada. From 2002 to 2004, she served again as vice president of the American Statistical Association.

In addition, Gentleman served as associate editor and a section editor for The American Statistician, editorial board member and a section co-editor for The Canadian Journal of Statistics, editorial board member for Survey Methodology, and editor-in-chief of Health Reports.

Gentleman had a cross-appointment with the University of Waterloo’s Department of Computer Science (1973-1977), served as a statistical consultant for the Ontario Ministry of Labour (1979-1983), and was a visiting associate professor at Stanford University's Department of Statistics (summer 1981).

== Awards ==
- 1983: Fellow of the American Statistical Association
- 1990: Elected Member of the International Statistics Institute
- 2002: Janet L. Norwood Award
- 2005: Faculty of Mathematics Alumni Achievement Medal, University of Waterloo

== Personal ==
In 1959, Jane Forer married Bernard Munk; they had one child. In 1967, she married W. Morven Gentleman; they had one child.

Mary E. Thompson (later, also president of the Statistical Society of Canada) has called Gentleman "a fine role model and mentor."

She died in February 2023 following a lengthy battle with cancer.
