= Jiahua Chen =

Canadian statistician

- 陈家骅
- Education: University of Science and Technology of China (BSc); Academia Sinica; University of Wisconsin–Madison (PhD)
- Awards: CRM-SSC Prize (2005); SSC Gold Medal (2014); Fellow of the Royal Society of Canada (2022)
- Scientific career
- Fields: Statistics
- Workplaces: University of British Columbia; University of Waterloo; Yunnan University
- Doctoral advisor: C. F. Jeff Wu

Jiahua Chen is a statistician and a professor at the Department of Statistics of the University of British Columbia. He was a Canada Research Chair (Tier I) of the University for the period of 2007 to 2020. He has done research work on statistical genetics, finite mixture models, empirical likelihood, variable selection, sampling theory and the design of experiments.

Chen is an elected fellow of the Institute of Mathematical Statistics (2005), the American Statistical Association (2009) and the Royal Society of Canada (2022). His awards include the CRM-SSC Prize (2005), the Gold Medal of the Statistical Society of Canada (2014) and the International Chinese Statistical Association Distinguished Achievement Award (2016).

== Early life and education ==
Chen was born in China. Owing to the Cultural Revolution, he did not get any elementary or secondary education; instead, he worked for three years in construction works during what would have been his high school years. He got admission into the University of Science and Technology of China in Hefei and earned his bachelor's degree in 1982 and then a master's degree in statistics at Academia Sinica in Beijing in 1985. He obtained his PhD in statistics at the University of Wisconsin–Madison in 1990, writing his thesis on minimum aberration fractional factorial designs under the supervision of C. F. Jeff Wu. Following his doctorate, Chen was a postdoctoral fellow under John D. Kalbfleisch.

== Career ==
Chen started his academic career as an assistant professor at the University of Waterloo in 1991. He was promoted to the rank of associate professor in 1996 and became a professor in 2001. He was then recruited as a professor at the University of British Columbia in 2007 and was appointed to a Tier I Canada Research Chair in the application of finite mixture models in statistical genetics, a position he held until 2020.

Chen has also held appointments in China. He was the director of the Big Data Institute at Yunnan University from 2016 to 2021 and held a part-time post at Yunnan University through the Thousand Talents Plan of China.

He was the president of the International Chinese Statistical Association (ICSA) from 2005 to 2006 and the president of the Survey Methods Section of the Statistical Society of Canada in 2007. His editorial service includes a term as editor-in-chief of the Canadian Journal of Statistics (2010–2012) and as a series editor of the ICSA Book Series in Statistics published by Springer (2013–2019).

== Research ==
Chen's research spans finite mixture models, empirical likelihood, variable selection, statistical genetics, survey sampling, the design of experiments and asymptotic theory. His doctoral work, supervised by C. F. Jeff Wu, concerned minimum-aberration fractional factorial designs, a criterion for selecting efficient experimental designs.

One theme of Chen's research is the theory of finite mixture models, whose irregular parameter space causes standard likelihood asymptotics to break down. In a 1995 paper in the Annals of Statistics he established the best possible rate of convergence for estimating the mixing distribution, showing that although a √n-consistent rate is attainable when the number of components is known, the optimal rate falls to n^{−1/4} when it is unknown, a rate achieved by suitable minimum-distance estimators under a strong-identifiability condition. Later authors have treated the finding as a foundational reference point in the convergence theory of mixture models, describing it as a surprising departure from regular parametric behavior. Subsequent work by other researchers refined the precise rate. Heinrich and Kahn (2018), also in the Annals of Statistics, identified a gap in Chen's upper-bound argument. It did not account for distinct mixture components converging toward a common location, and showed that the optimal local minimax rate is instead n^{−1/(4(m−m_{0})+2)} for a target with m_{0} components estimated within the class of m-component mixtures, which is slower than n^{−1/4} once the model permits more components than the truth and degrades further as that gap widens.

Chen's 1993 paper with Jing Qin showed how empirical likelihood can incorporate auxiliary information when estimating finite-population quantities. Later, he extended his technique to handle the case of constrained problems, and with A. M. Variyath and Bovas Abraham, came up with the idea of adjusted empirical likelihood. In this technique, an artificial data point is included into the data set such that the convex hull of the augmented data includes the origin, thus creating confidence regions that have better coverage probability. With Yukun Liu, Chen later showed that, by tuning the level of adjustment to the Bartlett correction factor, it attains high-order precision.

In the area of variable selection, Chen and Zehua Chen introduced the extended Bayesian information criterion (EBIC). EBIC adds a penalty on the size of the model space to the ordinary BIC so that sparse models are favoured in case the number of candidate covariates grows with the sample size. The criterion is consistent for linear regression with large model spaces, and later work extended the idea to outside the linear full-likelihood case such as composite likelihood model selection, where the linear-model EBIC is a special case.

Chen also worked on the treatment of item non-response in surveys through imputation. He and Jun Shao wrote a series of papers studying nearest-neighbour imputation, in which a missing value is replaced by the observed value of the most similar responding unit. Chen and Shao later showed that the resulting estimator of the population mean is asymptotically unbiased without requiring a linear relationship between the imputed variable and the auxiliary information, and that the empirical distribution function obtained from nearest-neighbour imputation is asymptotically unbiased, so that quantile estimators are also unbiased. They then derived design-consistent variance estimators for means and quantiles when the imputed values cannot be identified in the data set, and showed that the ordinary adjusted jackknife overestimates the variance under nearest-neighbour imputation, and proposed modified jackknife estimators that are asymptotically valid.

== Awards and honours ==
- 2005 - Elected Fellow of the Institute of Mathematical Statistics
- 2009 - Elected Fellow of the American Statistical Association
- 2022 - Elected Fellow of the Royal Society of Canada

== Selected publications ==
- Chen, Jiahua; Qin, Jing (1993). "Empirical likelihood estimation for finite populations and the effective usage of auxiliary information". Biometrika. 80 (1): 107–116. doi:10.1093/biomet/80.1.107.
- Chen, Hanfeng; Chen, Jiahua; Kalbfleisch, John D. (2001). "A modified likelihood ratio test for homogeneity in finite mixture models". Journal of the Royal Statistical Society, Series B. 63 (1): 19–29. doi:10.1111/1467-9868.00273.
- Chen, Jiahua; Chen, Zehua (2008). "Extended Bayesian information criteria for model selection with large model spaces". Biometrika. 95 (3): 759–771. doi:10.1093/biomet/asn034.
- Chen, Jiahua; Liu, Yukun (2013). "Quantile and quantile-function estimations under density ratio model". Annals of Statistics. 41 (3): 1669–1692. arXiv:1308.2845. doi:10.1214/13-AOS1129.
- Chen, Jiahua (2023). Statistical Inference Under Mixture Models. Springer. doi:10.1007/978-981-99-6141-2. ISBN 978-981-99-6141-2.
