= Alfred Veillet =

French painter (1882-1958)

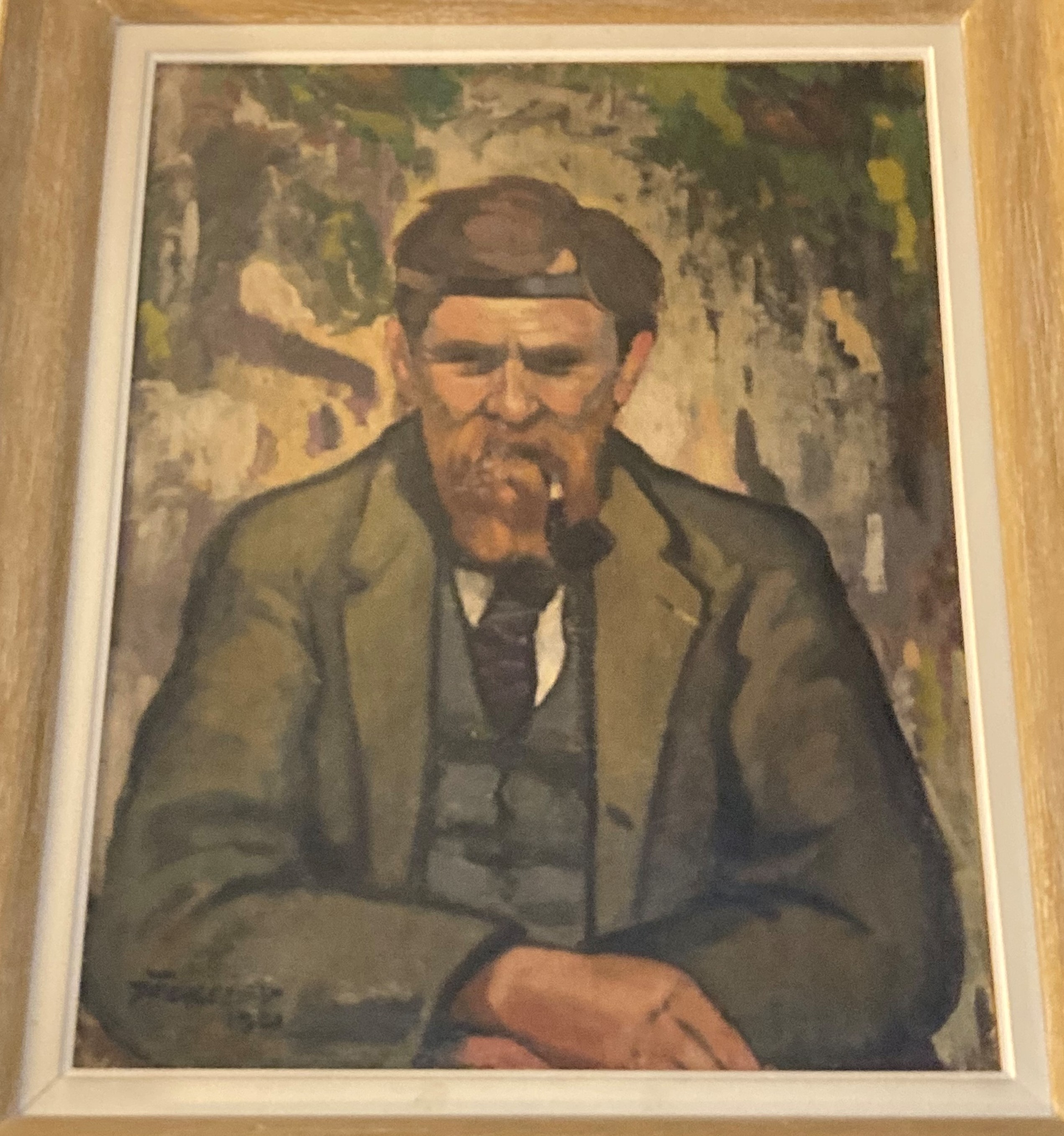
- Alfred Veillet par Jean Texier (1924)
- Born: March 2, 1882; Ézy-sur-Eure, France
- Died: April 9, 1958 (aged 76); Rolleboise, Yvelines)

Alfred Veillet (March 2, 1882 - April 9, 1958) was a French painter.

== Biography ==
Born in Ézy-sur-Eure from Jean Léon Veillet, painter worker, and Clémence Marquis, housewife, he began his professional career in 1898 as a worker painter in Bonnières-sur-Seine. Having become a qualified decorator, the chance of an order led him to Percival Rosseau, painter American established in Rolleboise, to whom he showed his first paintings. The latter introduced him to his compatriot and neighbor Daniel Ridgway Knight, painter naturalist and great admirer of Corot, as Veillet. These contacts encouraged him to continue his artistic activity.

In 1905, he made the acquaintance of the painter Maximilien Luce during the independent living room in Paris, bought him two landscapes, and became friends with him. He convinced him in 1920 to buy a house in Rolleboise, not far from his.

That same year he sent his first painting to the Salon des Indépendants, in which he regularly participated throughout his life. In 1906, he set up on his own in Freneuse, then in 1913 in Rolleboise. Besides Maximilien Luce, Ridgway Knight, Percival Rosseau, he also frequents Georgette Agutte, Herbert Ward, Jean Texcier. and more occasionally Paul Signac, Albert Dagnaux, Charles Angrand. Participating in numerous fairs and exhibitions, he is recognized by art critics such as Apollinaire, André Warnod or Roger Allard.

When the First World War struck, although reformed due to poor health, he enlisted as a voluntary combatant with the rank of corporal, took part in various battles, but was seriously wounded in the head on July 2, 1917 at Chemin des Dames. This will earn him several quotes and several decorations. After having been trepanned, hospitalized for a year, he remains war disabled, suffering from headaches, dizziness, dysmnesia and partial deafness., but he nevertheless continues to exercise his art.

He was deputy mayor of Rolleboise, Yvelines, and in 1937, was elected borough councilor of Bonnières-sur-Seine.

On April 9, 1958, he died in Rolleboise, where he was buried.

== Trade fairs and exhibitions ==
- From 1905, he exhibited regularly at the Salon des Indépendants.
- In 1910: Exhibition at the Galerie Brunner for the benefit of those affected by the centennial flood. Guillaume Apollinaire notices it and quotes it for the first time in the newspaper "L'Intransigeant".
- In March 1910, the Camentron gallery in Paris devotes a personal exhibition to him where thirty-five paintings are presented.
- In 1922: Exhibition with Jean Texcier at the Legrip Gallery, in Rouen where Charles Angrand, Paul Signac and Maximilien Luce are invited.
- In 1923, Veillet participated in the creation of an annual exhibition at Mantes, the first of a long series. Paul Signac, Georgette Agutte, Albert Dagnaux and many artists from the region collaborate. In 1950 the "association of painters from Mantois" was founded, of which Veillet became the first president.

At the same time, Veillet exhibits regularly at the veterans' fair, "la Samothrace".

- In 1928: Joint exhibition with Maximilien Luce at Tréport, then at Vézelay.

=== Posthumous exhibitions ===
- In 1959: at the Salon des Independents.
- In 1970: at the municipal library of Mantes.
- In 1980: at the Versailles tourist office.
- In 1990: at the Regional Center for Cultural Development of Rosny-sur-Seine.
- At the beginning of the 2000s: at the "Sloan's auction galleries" in Washington.
- In 2013: at the Hôtel-Dieu de Mantes museum, as part of the exhibition "Jean Agamemnon & his painters, Luce, Veillet, Lauvray".
- In 2013 and 2014: at the Hôtel-Dieu museum, on the occasion of an exhibition of paintings relating to Mantes and its region resulting from the donation of Rodolphe Walter in this city.

== Work ==
In their Dictionary of the little masters, Gérald Schurr and Pierre Cabanne describe the talents of Alfred Veillet as follows:

Attentive to the spectacles of water and the sky, Veillet is an endearing Post-Impressionist, full of verve and poetry, sometimes showing a certain melancholy in front of a nature whose fleeting character he apprehends. He exhibited at the Salon des Indépendants where Apollinaire noticed him and judged, in 1914, that his landscapes were “delicate like the sites of Sequania which inspired them”

His favorite technique is oil painting, and his subjects are mostly landscapes without people where water dominates: banks of the Seine, ponds, lakes, bridges, seaside, ports... called himself "the last impressionist of the 20th century".

== Public collections ==
- A landscape of Vétheuil sous la neige was acquired by the State in 1952.
- Another of his paintings, entitled Vallée de la Seine is hung in the room of the municipal council of Mureaux.
- Works by Alfred Veillet are part of the donation of paintings made in 2013 by Rodolphe Walter to the town of Mantes, now visible at the Hôtel-Dieu museum.

== Distinctions and tributes ==
He receives successively the following decorations:

- Médaille militaire (1917)
- Croix de guerre 1914–1918, étoile de bronze (1917)
- Legion of Honour (1932).
- Volunteer combatant's cross 1914–1918 (1937)

His name was given to a street in Ézy-sur-Eure, his hometown.
