= Douglas Wiens =

Canadian statistician

Douglas Paul Wiens is a Canadian statistician; he is a professor in the Department of Mathematical and Statistical Sciences at the University of Alberta.

Wiens earned a B.Sc. in mathematics (1972), two master's degrees in mathematical logic (1974) and statistics (1979), and a Ph.D. in statistics (1982), all from the University of Calgary. As part of his work on mathematical logic, in connection with Hilbert's tenth problem, Wiens helped find a diophantine formula for the primes: that is, multivariate polynomial with the property that the positive values of this polynomial, over integer arguments, are exactly the prime numbers. Wiens and his co-authors won the Lester R. Ford award of the Mathematical Association of America in 1977 for their paper describing this result. His Ph.D. dissertation was entitled Robust Estimation for Multivariate Location and Scale in the Presence of Asymmetry and was supervised by John R. Collins. After receiving his Ph.D. in 1982, Wiens took a faculty position at Dalhousie University, and moved in 1987 to Alberta.

Wiens was editor-in-chief of The Canadian Journal of Statistics from 2004 to 2006 and program chair of the 2003 annual meeting of the Statistical Society of Canada. Along with the Ford award, Wiens received The Canadian Journal of Statistics Award in 1990 for his paper "Minimax-variance L- and R-estimators of location". In 2005 he was elected as a Fellow of the American Statistical Association. He received the Gold Medal of the Statistical Society of Canada in 2018.
