= Jean Veillet =

Jean Veillet may refer to:

- Jean Veillet (1664–1741), French and Canadian ancestor of all the Veillet/te(s) of America
- Jean Veillet (1901–1985), French doctor part of the French Resistance in WWII, mayor of Dijon, and president of the general council of Côte-d'Or, France

== See also ==
- Jean Veillot (died before 1662) was a French composer and priest
- Veillette (disambiguation)
