= Association des statisticiennes et statisticiens du Québec =

- Abbreviation: ASSQ
- Type: Organizations based in Canada
- Legal status: Active
- Purpose: Advocate and public voice, educator and network to promote the use and development of statistics.
- Headquarters: 3340, rue de la Pérade; 3e étage Quebec City, Quebec; G1X 2L7
- Region served: Quebec
- Members: Approx. 150
- Official language: French
- Website: www.association-assq.qc.ca

The ASSQ is a professional association of statisticians based in the province of Quebec, Canada. The acronym stands for Association des statisticiennes et statisticiens du Québec (the Québec Association of Statisticians, Male and Female). The association was officially created on May 12, 1995, by Letters Patents from the Québec Government. Its permanent office is located in Quebec City.

The ASSQ promotes statistics and its use in public life and runs an accreditation program; it also represents the views and defends the interests of statisticians across the province. The association has 6 institutional members and approximately 150 members from government, academia and the private sector; accredited members can use the title STAT ASSQ in correspondence.

The association maintains a web site (http://www.association-assq.qc.ca/) and publishes a regular newsletter entitled Convergence. It also organizes various scientific and professional activities, the most prominent of which are its annual meeting (typically held in June) and a golf tournament (usually held in September).

== Institutional members ==
- Institut de la statistique du Québec
- Les Services Conseil Hardy
- SOM, Recherches & Sondages (Québec)
- Statistics Canada
- Techno5 (Montréal)
- Université Laval

== Presidents of the ASSQ ==
The President of the ASSQ is the highest officer of the association. He or she is elected by the entire membership. In the following list, the affiliations are those that were valid when the incumbent was in office.

- 1995-1997: Mario Montégiani (Ministère de la Sécurité publique)
- 1998-1998: Sylvain Végiard (Ministère des Ressources naturelles du Québec)
- 1999-2000: Marc Duchesne (Viasystems)
- 2001-2002: Pierre Lavallée (Statistics Canada)
- 2003-2004: Sylvain Végiard (Institut de la statistique du Québec)
- 2005-2008: Christian Genest (Université Laval)
- 2009-2010: Martin Rioux (Geyser Statistique)
- 2011-2014: Nathalie Madore (Régie des rentes du Québec)
- 2015: Véronique Tremblay (Desjardins Assurances Générales)
- 2016: Jean-Roch Leclerc (Sigmu Management)
- 2016: Bouchra Nasri (INRS-ETE), interim
- 2017-: Louis-Paul Rivest (Université Laval)

== Publication ==
The ASSQ publishes a newsletter called Convergence. The first 16 volumes are available in print and can also be downloaded for free from http://www.association-assq.qc.ca/autre-convergence/. More recent issues are electronic and made available to the public at large on the association's website a few months after their distribution to the membership.

Below is a list of Editors of the paper version of Convergence, along with their affiliation when they took office.

- 1996: Julie Trépanier (Statistics Canada)
- 1997-1998: Marc Duchesne (Circo-Craft)
- 1999-2002: Daniel Hurtubise (Statistics Canada)
- 2003-2004: Myrto Mondor (Centre de recherche de l'Hôpital du Saint-Sacrement, Québec)
- 2005-2006: Mireille Guay (Health Canada)
- 2007-2011: Jean-François Quessy (Université du Québec à Trois-Rivières)
- 2012-2017 : Denis Talbot (Université Laval)
- 2017- : Bouchra Nasri (HEC Montréal) and Bruno Rémillard (HEC Montréal)
- 2018- : Pierre Lavallée

== Honorary members ==
Honorary members of the ASSQ are individuals who have made exceptional contributions to the development of statistical sciences in Québec or whose work has had a major impact on the development of the association. The current list of ASSQ honorary members is given below, with the affiliation in the year of election.

- Bernard Colin (Université de Sherbrooke, 2015)
- Christian Desbiens (Institut de la statistique du Québec, 2015)
- Marc Duchesne (Desjardins Group, 2015)
- Isabelle Gagnon (Société de transport de Montréal, 2015)
- Christian Genest (McGill University, 2012)
- Pierre Lavallée (Statistics Canada, 2015)
- Ernest Monga (Université de Sherbrooke, 2015)
- Mario Montégiani (Société de l'assurance automobile du Québec, 2015)
- Louis-Paul Rivest (Université Laval, 2011)
- Natalie Rodrigue (Creascience Inc., 2015)
- Gilles Therrien (SOM, Recherches & Sondages, 2015)
- Julie Trépanier (Statistics Canada, 2015)
