= Janet L. Norwood =

American statistician (1923–2015)

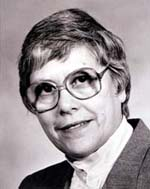
- Born: Janet Sonia Lippe; December 11, 1923; Newark, New Jersey, U.S.
- Died: March 27, 2015 (aged 91); Austin, Texas, U.S.
- Education: LL.D. (Honorary) Carnegie Mellon University, Harvard University, and Florida International University; Ph.D., M.A. Fletcher School of Law and Diplomacy; B.A. Douglass College
- Spouse: Bernard Norwood (m. 1944)
- Children: 2, including Stephen

Janet Lippe Norwood (December 11, 1923 – March 27, 2015) was an American statistician and the first female Commissioner of the U.S. Bureau of Labor Statistics (BLS) when she was appointed in 1979 by President Jimmy Carter. She was reappointed twice by President Reagan. She left the Bureau in 1991 and joined the Urban Institute as a Senior Fellow, a position she held until 1999. She was also appointed as the Chair of the Advisory Council on Unemployment Compensation, first by President George H. W. Bush in 1993 and then re-elected by President Bill Clinton. She stepped down from that position in 1996. She received numerous awards including several honorary doctorate degrees from academic institutions, including Harvard University.

== Biography ==
Born in Newark, New Jersey, Janet Norwood grew up in Irvington, and graduated from the New Jersey College for Women (now Douglass College) of Rutgers University. She then earned her doctorate at The Fletcher School of Law and Diplomacy at Tufts University.

After she taught a year of political science at Wellesley College, she and her husband moved to Washington, where he entered Government service and became a U.S. Foreign Service Officer. In the late 1950s and early 1960s, they lived in Luxembourg and Brussels, where she and their two children accompanied him on assignment to the U.S. Mission to the European Communities.

Norwood started at the U.S. Bureau of Labor Statistics as a part-time junior economist in the early 1980s. She rose to head the agency for thirteen years, confirmed by the U.S. Senate for four-year appointments, initially by President Jimmy Carter and twice by President Ronald Reagan. She took on management of the agency soon after the Nixon White House ordered the Bureau to cease holding press conferences on the occasion of the monthly release of employment and unemployment data. Immediately following that order, the Congressional Joint Economic Committee decided to restore the public airing of the data by holding public hearings at which it called the Bureau's head to testify. Norwood developed a reputation for what the Committee cited, at the time of her retirement from Government service in 1991 and completion of 137 appearances over 13 year before it, her “integrity, professionalism, and impartiality.”

Norwood helped bring recognition to female presence and leadership, in a context where she was frequently the only woman at government agency and professional association meetings. Among the first group of women to be admitted to the Cosmos Club, in Washington, D.C., she became its first female president in 1995. When asked, especially by young women, for guidance about career development, she advised them to have a supportive husband. She had married at the end of her sophomore year of college, when her husband was a private in a World War II Army college training program.

During both her service as Commissioner of Labor Statistics or following government retirement, she served as head, board member, or senior adviser of professional organizations, including the American Statistical Association, the International Statistical Institute, the Urban Institute, the National Opinion Research Center at the University of Chicago (NORC), the Conference Board, the statistical organization State of the USA Inc. (SOUSA), the Institute of Global Ethics, the Consortium of Social Science Associations, the Committee of National Statistics of the National Research Council of the National Academy of Sciences (CNSTAT), the Advisory Council on Unemployment Compensation, and served on the corporate boards of Republic National Bank, History Associates, Inc., and MidAtlantic Medical Services, Inc. (MAMSI). After serving as chair of a committee on statistics of the Organization for Economic Cooperation and Development, that OECD group in Paris reappointed her to continue as chair after she had retired from government service and was a private citizen. Also unusually, while BLS Commissioner, she served as a member of a Canadian Government statistical committee. She was awarded Presidential Rank as Distinguished Executive in the U.S. Senior Executive Service (SES). In 2015, she died of Alzheimer's disease.

== Honors and awards ==
Carnegie Mellon University, Florida International University, Rutgers University, and Harvard University awarded honorary doctorates to Norwood.

In 1974 she was elected as a Fellow of the American Statistical Association. She was an Honorary Fellow of the Royal Statistical Society.

In 1998 Norwood was recipient of the American Statistical Association's Founders Award.

In 2015 the conference center at the Bureau of Labor Statistics was officially renamed in her honor as the Janet L. Norwood Conference and Training Center.

=== Janet L. Norwood Awards ===
Since 2002, the University of Alabama at Birmingham, School of Public Health has a "Janet L. Norwood Award" to recognize outstanding women in statistics annually. Previous recipients of the award include Jane F. Gentleman, Lynne Billard, and Nan Laird.

Since 2018, The Pennsylvania State University, Eberly College of Science has a "Science of Achievement Janet L. Norwood Graduate Scholarship in Statistics" awarded annually to an incoming Statistics Ph.D. student who has shown leadership, particularly in advancing careers for women, and research excellence.

== Publications ==
=== Books ===
Norwood, Janet (May 1, 1995). Organizing To Count. Urban Institute Press. ISBN 0877666350.

=== Other ===
"Review of Research at the Bureau of Labor Statistics", by Janet L. Norwood and Cathryn Dippo, is the last section of the book The Professional Quest for Truth: A Social Theory of Science and Knowledge (1992), by Stephan Fuchs

== Personal life ==
Janet L. Norwood married Bernard Norwood in 1944; they had two children, including history professor Stephen H. Norwood.

== See also ==
- Jane F. Gentleman
- Lynne Billard
- Nan Laird
