= Donald A. S. Fraser =

Canadian statistician (1925–2020)

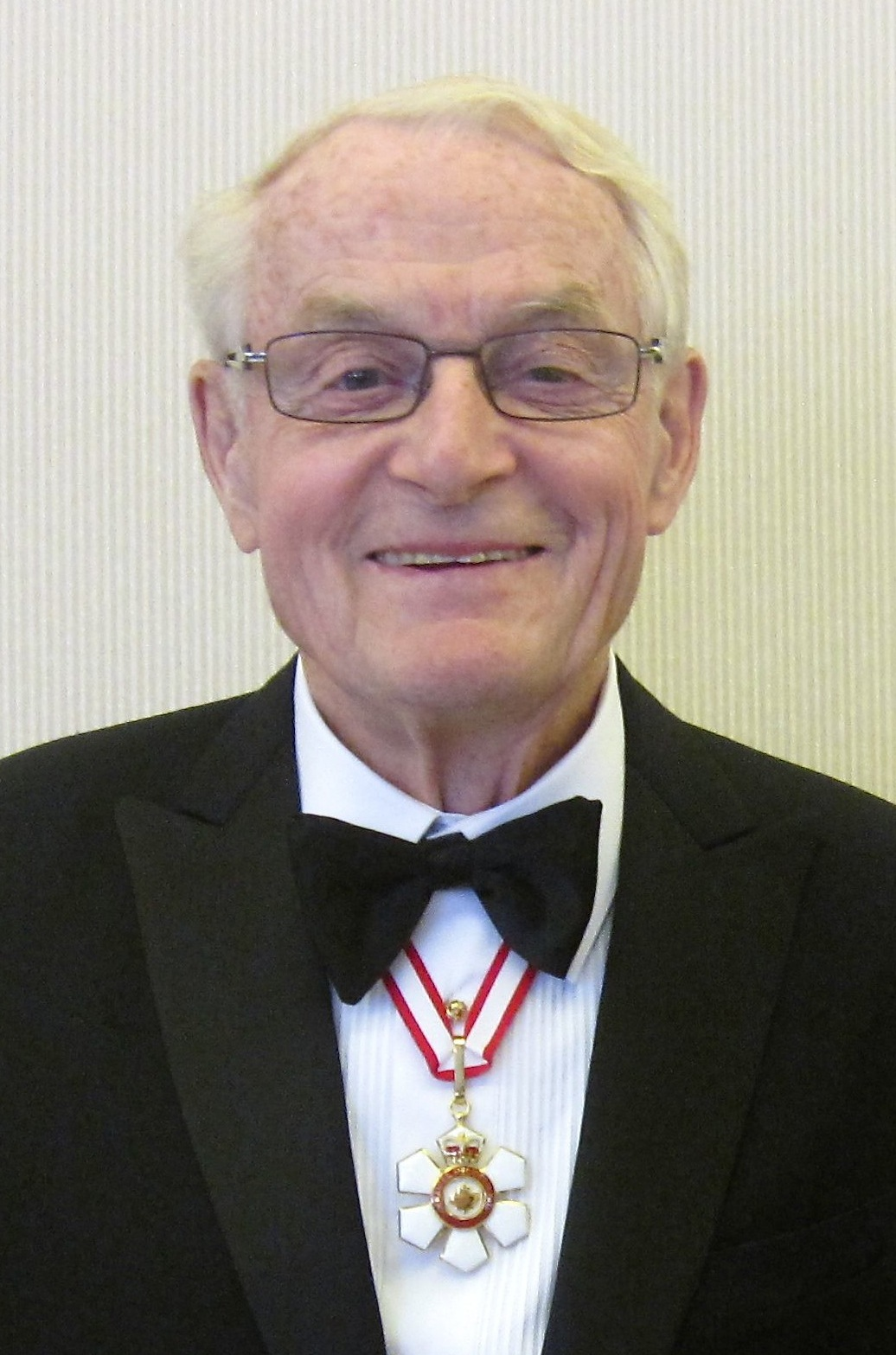
- Born: April 29, 1925; Toronto, Ontario, Canada
- Died: December 21, 2020 (aged 95); Toronto, Ontario, Canada
- Education: University of Toronto; Princeton University
- Spouse: Nancy Reid
- Scientific career
- Fields: Statistics; Mathematics
- Workplaces: University of Toronto
- Thesis: Generalized Hit Probabilities with a Gaussian Target (1949)
- Doctoral advisor: Samuel S. Wilks; John Tukey
- Doctoral students: Mir Masoom Ali; Mir Maswood Ali; Ross Prentice; Grace Y. Yi

Donald Alexander Stuart Fraser OC FRSC (April 29, 1925 – December 21, 2020) was a Canadian statistician, and Professor Emeritus at the University of Toronto. In 2012 he was appointed an Officer of the Order of Canada for his influence in the advancement of the statistical sciences in Canada. In 1961 he was elected as a Fellow of the American Statistical Association. In 1985, he was awarded the first Gold Medal of the Statistical Society of Canada. In 2014 he was chosen as a fellow of the American Mathematical Society "for contributions to the theory and foundations of statistics, as well as for leadership and influence on the advancement of the statistical sciences."

== Early life ==
Donald Fraser was born in Toronto, and raised in Stratford, Ontario. He attended St. Andrew's College in Aurora from 1939 to 1942, and the University of Toronto from 1942 to 1947, completing a bachelor's degree in mathematics, physics and chemistry. While at the University of Toronto he distinguished himself in the sciences, and especially in mathematics. He was a member of the first place team and a Putnam fellow in the William Lowell Putnam Mathematical Competition in 1946.
