= Christian Genest =

Canadian mathematician (born 1957)

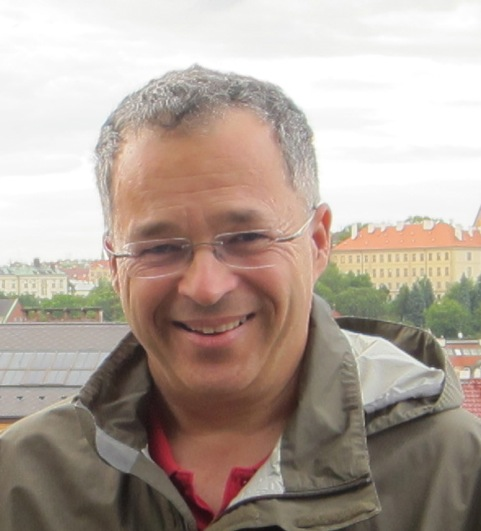
- Born: January 11, 1957 (age 69); Chicoutimi, Quebec, Canada
- Education: PhD, University of British Columbia MSc, Université de Montréal BSc, Université du Québec à Chicoutimi
- Spouse: Johanna G. Nešlehová
- Scientific career
- Fields: Statistics and actuarial science
- Workplaces: University of Waterloo (1984-87); Université Laval (1987-2010); McGill University (2010-)
- Doctoral advisor: James V. Zidek

Christian Genest (/ʒənɛ/; born January 11, 1957, in Chicoutimi, Quebec) is a professor in the Department of Mathematics and Statistics at McGill University (Montréal, Canada), where he held a Canada Research Chair between 2011 and 2025. He is the author of numerous research papers in multivariate analysis, nonparametric statistics, extreme-value theory, and multiple-criteria decision analysis.

He is a recipient of the Statistical Society of Canada's Gold Medal for Research and was elected a Fellow of the Royal Society of Canada in 2015.

== Contributions ==
Genest is best known for developing models and statistical inference techniques for studying the dependence between variables through the concept of copula. He has designed, among others, various techniques for selecting, estimating and validating copula-based models through rank-based methods. His methodological contributions in multivariate analysis and extreme-value theory found numerous practical applications in finance, insurance, and hydrology.

Throughout his career, Genest also made significant contributions to the development of techniques for the reconciliation and use of expert opinions and pairwise comparison methods used to establish priorities in multiple-criteria decision analysis. He is the author or co-author of over 380 scientific publications, about half of which appeared in peer-reviewed journals. Part of his work is also concerned with the history of statistics and scientometrics. Christian Genest has given over 360 invited talks, including 90+ presentations for a general audience.

== Birthplace and education ==
Christian Genest was born on January 11, 1957, in Chicoutimi (Québec, Canada). He was trained as a mathematician at the Université du Québec à Chicoutimi (B.Sp.Sc., 1977) and at the Université de Montréal (M.Sc., 1978) before completing graduate studies in statistics at the University of British Columbia (Ph.D., 1983). His thesis, entitled "Towards a Consensus of Opinion", was written under the supervision of James V. Zidek and earned him the Pierre Robillard Award from the Statistical Society of Canada (SSC) in 1984.

== Academic career ==
After completing his PhD, Christian Genest was a postdoctoral fellow and visiting assistant professor at Carnegie Mellon University (Pittsburgh, Pennsylvania) in 1983–84. From 1984 to 1987, he was an assistant professor in the Department of Statistics and Actuarial Science at the University of Waterloo (Waterloo, ON). He was then hired by Université Laval (Québec, QC), where he was promoted to the ranks of associate in 1989 and professor in 1993. He joined McGill University (Montréal, QC) in 2010, where he held a Canada Research Chair in Stochastic Dependence Modeling from 2011 to 2025.

== Honors and prizes ==
Christian Genest was the first recipient of the CRM-SSC Prize in 1999. He received the SUMMA Research Award from Université Laval the same year. In 2011, the Statistical Society of Canada awarded him its most prestigious distinction, the gold medal, "in recognition of his remarkable contributions to multivariate analysis and nonparametric statistics, notably through the development of models and methods of inference for studying stochastic dependence, synthesizing expert judgments and multi-criteria decision making, as well as for his applications thereof in various fields such as insurance, finance, and hydrology." Christian Genest is a fellow of the American Statistical Association since 1996, a fellow of the Institute of Mathematical Statistics since 1997, and an honorary member of the Association des statisticiennes et statisticiens du Québec since 2012. He was elected a Fellow of the Royal Society of Canada in 2015 and received a Humboldt Research Prize from the Alexander von Humboldt Foundation in 2019. He was the first statistician to receive the John L. Synge Award in 2020 and the CRM-Fields-PIMS prize in 2023. In 2024, he was awarded the Parzen Prize.

== Community service ==
Christian Genest has served the mathematical and statistical communities in many ways. Among others, he was director of the Institut des sciences mathématiques du Québec (2012–15), president of the Statistical Society of Canada (2007–08) and president of the Association des statisticiennes et statisticiens du Québec (2005–08). He served on Statistics Canada's Advisory Committee on Statistical Methods for several years, and on the editorial board of various peer-review journals, including The Canadian Journal of Statistics (1988–2003), the Journal de la Société française de statistique (1999–2008) and the Journal of Multivariate Analysis (2003–2015). He was also editor in chief of The Canadian Journal of Statistics (1998–2000) and guest editor for various books and special issues, including two for Insurance: Mathematics and Economics (2005, 2009). From September 2015 to May 2019, he was editor in chief of the Journal of Multivariate Analysis. His many contributions earned him the Distinguished Service Award from the Statistical Society of Canada as early as 1997.

== Others ==
Christian Genest is married to Johanna G. Nešlehová, professor of statistics at McGill University. One of his sisters, Sylvie Genest, is a professor in the Faculty of Arts at the Université du Québec à Montréal. Christian has four children (Marianne, Arnaud, Vincent, Richard). Vincent Genest is himself a researcher and the author of many papers in mathematical physics.
