= Charmaine Dean =

Statistician from Trinidad

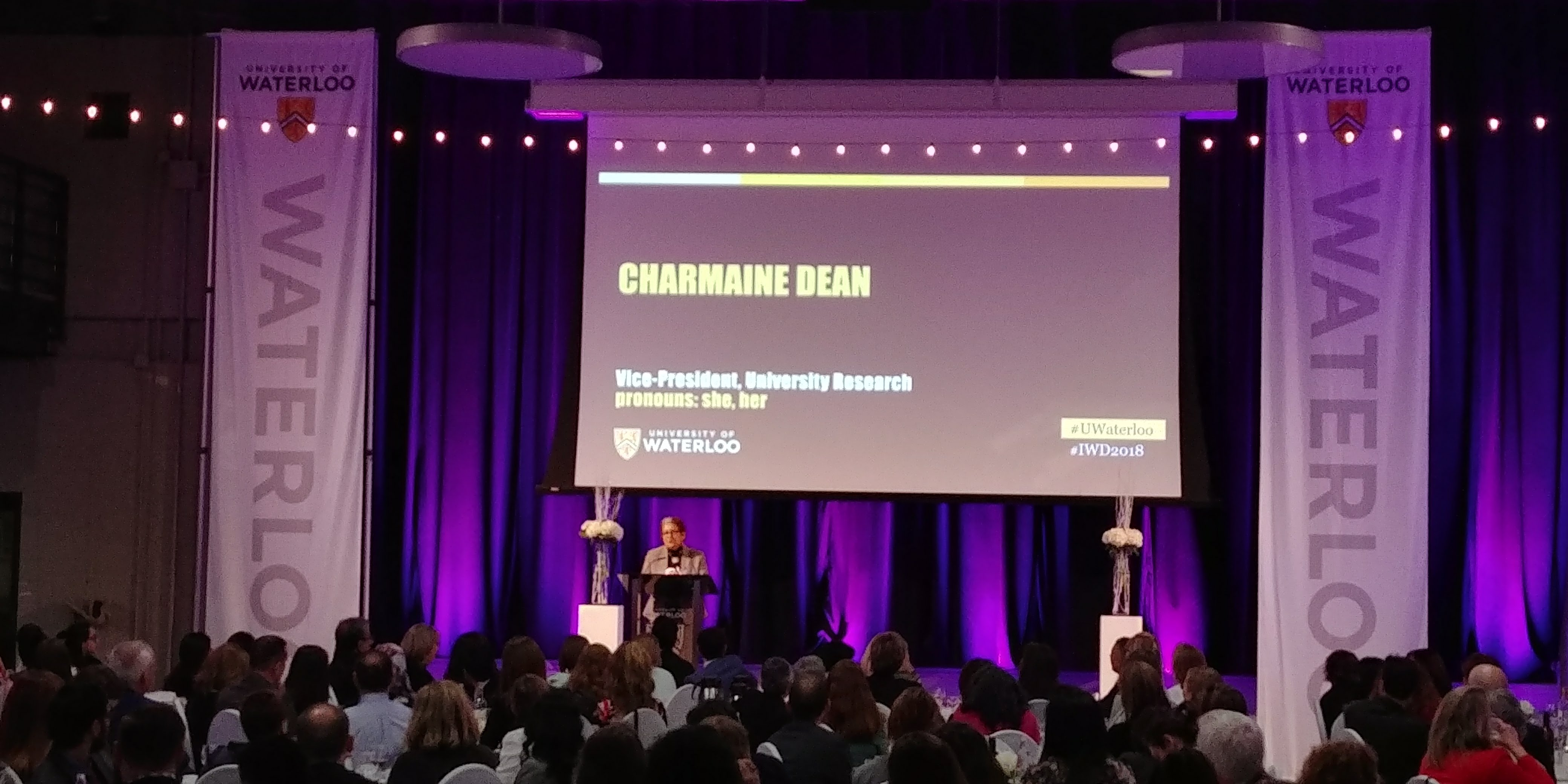
- Dean speaking at University of Waterloo's 2018 International Women's Day dinner
- Born: 1958; San Fernando, Trinidad and Tobago
- Education: University of Saskatchewan University of Waterloo
- Awards: SSC Gold Medal (2023); Trinidad & Tobago Canadian High Commission Award (2012); CRM-SSC Prize in Statistics (2003)
- Scientific career
- Thesis: Mixed Poisson Models and Regression Methods for Count Data (1988)
- Doctoral advisor: Jerald F. Lawless

Charmaine B. Dean (born 1958) is a statistician from Trinidad. She is the vice president for research at the University of Waterloo, a professor of statistical and actuarial sciences at both Waterloo and Western University, the former president of the Western North American Region of the International Biometric Society, and the former President of the Statistical Society of Canada. Her research interests include longitudinal studies, survival analysis, spatiotemporal data, heart surgery, and wildfires.

== Education and career ==
Dean was born in San Fernando, Trinidad and Tobago in 1958 and moved to Canada when she was 19. She graduated in 1980 with honours in mathematics from the University of Saskatchewan. She did her graduate studies at the University of Waterloo, earning a master's degree in 1984 and a Ph.D. in 1988, supervised by Jerry Lawless. Her dissertation was Mixed Poisson Models and Regression Methods for Count Data.

After a year at the University of Calgary, she joined the faculty at Simon Fraser University in 1989, and became the founding chair of the Department of Statistics and Actuarial Science there at its establishment in 2001. She served as president of the Western North American Region of the International Biometric Society in 2002 and of the Statistical Society of Canada in 2007. She became Burnaby Mountain Research Chair at Simon Fraser before moving to the University of Western Ontario as Dean of Science in 2011. She stepped down as Dean at Western and became vice president for research at Waterloo in 2017.

== Recognition ==
Dean was elected as a Fellow of the American Statistical Association in 2007, and in 2010 she was elected as a Fellow of the American Association for the Advancement of Science. She is also an elected member of the International Statistical Institute and a Fellow of the Institute of Mathematical Statistics.

In 2003, she won the CRM-SSC Prize in Statistics of the Centre de Recherches Mathématiques and the Statistical Society of Canada. In 2012 she won the Trinidad & Tobago Canadian High Commission Award. She was awarded the Gold Medal of the Statistical Society of Canada in 2023.
