= James G. Kalbfleisch =

Canadian statistician and academic administrator

James (Jim) Grant Kalbfleisch (14 July 1940 – 23 April 2017) was a Canadian statistician and academic administrator. He was a Fellow of the American Statistical Association and a president of the Statistical Society of Canada.

== Education and career ==
Kalbfleisch was born in Galt, Ontario, to Claude and Janet Kalbfleisch, both teachers. He received his Ph.D. in Mathematics in 1966 from the University of Waterloo; his thesis was entitled "Chromatic Graphs and Ramsey's Theorem" and was supervised by Ralph Gordon Stanton. He joined the faculty at the University of Waterloo, where he later held several positions, including the following: Chair of the Department of Statistics [now Statistics and Actuarial Science] (1975–1979); Dean of the Faculty of Mathematics (1986–1989); Associate Provost, Academic Affairs (1990–1993); Vice-President Academic and Provost (1993–2000).

He was an author of about twenty peer-reviewed scholarly papers. He was also the author of the books Probability and Statistical Inference—Volume 1: Probability and Volume 2: Statistical Inference, published by Springer-Verlag; the first editions were published in 1979, and the second editions were published in 1985.

In 1975, Kalbfleisch was elected a Fellow of the American Statistical Association. In 1984, he served as president of the Statistical Society of Canada. (His younger brother Jack also served as president, in 1999–2000.) The University of Waterloo has two scholarships for incoming students that are named after him: the James G. Kalbfleisch National Scholarship, awarded by the Faculty of Mathematics, and the Jim Kalbfleisch Scholarship, awarded by the University.

== Personal life ==
Kalbfleisch was an avid bridge player. He died peacefully at his home in Waterloo, Ontario. He was survived by his wife of 54 years, Rebecca, and their three children.

== Sources ==
- "J. G. Kalbfleisch" —University of Waterloo
- "Remembering Jim Kalbfleisch", WATtimes, 22.2 (Spring 2017)
- "Jim Kalbfleisch 1940-2017" —Statistical Society of Canada
