= Grace Y. Yi =

Canadian statistician

Grace Yun Yi
- Title: Professor

Academic background
- Education: Sichuan University (B.Sc., M.Sc.); York University (M.A.); University of Toronto (Ph.D.)
- Doctoral advisor: Donald A. S. Fraser

Academic work
- Discipline: Statistics
- Institutions: University of Waterloo(2000-2019); University of Western Ontario(2019-)

Grace Yun Yi is a professor of the University of Western Ontario where she currently holds a Tier I Canada Research Chair in Data Science. She was a professor at the University of Waterloo, Canada, where she holds a University Research Chair in Statistical and Actuarial Science. Her research concerns event history analysis with missing data and its applications in medicine, engineering, and social science.

== Education and career ==
Yi earned bachelor's and master's degrees from Sichuan University, China, in 1986 and 1989. She moved to Canada and continued her studies with another master's degree from York University in 1996, and a Ph.D. from the University of Toronto in 2000 under the supervision of Donald A. S. Fraser. She came to Waterloo as a postdoctoral researcher, and then continued there as an assistant professor in 2001.

== Recognition ==
Yi won the CRM–SSC Prize of the Statistical Society of Canada in 2010. Her work with Xianming Tan and Runze Li won the Canadian Journal of Statistics Award for 2016.

In 2015 she was elected as a Fellow of the American Statistical Association "for research excellence in developing statistical theory and methods, particularly in missing and mis-measured data; for important contributions to biostatistics; and for excellence in statistical education and mentoring students." She is also a Fellow of the Institute of Mathematical Statistics. She was elected chair of the ASA Lifetime Data Science Section in 2021.

== Selected publications ==
- Cook, R. J., Zeng, L. and Yi, G. Y. (2004), "Marginal Analysis of Incomplete Longitudinal Binary Data: A Cautionary Note on LOCF Imputation." Biometrics, 60: 820–828. doi:10.1111/j.0006-341X.2004.00234.x
- Lindsay, B. G., Yi, G. Y., & Sun, J. (2011). "Issues and strategies in the selection of composite likelihoods." Statistica Sinica, 71–105. JSTOR 24309263
- Yi, G. Y., & Cook, R. J. (2002). "Marginal methods for incomplete longitudinal data arising in clusters." Journal of the American Statistical Association, 97(460), 1071–1080. doi:10.1198/016214502388618889
- Lang Wu, Wei Liu, Grace Y. Yi, and Yangxin Huang, "Analysis of Longitudinal and Survival Data: Joint Modeling, Inference Methods, and Issues" Journal of Probability and Statistics, vol. 2012, Article ID 640153, 17 pages, 2012. doi:10.1155/2012/640153
- Cook, R. J., Kalbfleisch, J. D., & Yi, G. Y. (2002). "A generalized mover–stayer model for panel data." Biostatistics, 3(3), 407–420. doi:10.1155/2012/640153
