= Association des Veillet/te d'Amérique =

The Association des Veillet/te d'Amérique inc (Veillet/te Association of America inc) is a non-profit organization bringing together the descendants of the couple Jean Veillet (1664–1741) and Catherine Lariou (1683–1756), as well as than their related people. This association obtained its letters patent on March 12, 1986, under the third part of the Quebec Companies Act (Canada).

Although the Mauricie is historically the main home of the descendants of Veillet/te in America, the Association represents all the descendants in America. In August 2021, more than 22,856 descendants of the ancestral couple Jean Veillet and Catherine Lariou were listed in America. These descendants have made a great mark on history for 354 years, particularly in Quebec, Canada and New England.

Jean Veillet turns out to be the sole ancestor of the Veillet/te in America; Jean Veillet married on November 19, 1698 in Batiscan to Catherine Lariou. In 1667, he left the "rue du Vieux-Marché" in Saint-André-de-Niort to embark on a sailing vessel in La Rochelle (France) bound for New France. After his military service, he settled on a farm along the Rivière à Veillet, in Sainte-Geneviève-de-Batiscan, Quebec.

According to Louis Duchesne of Institut de la statistique du Québec, the surname Veillette was in 2006 in 385th position among the surnames most used, that is to say 0.051% of the population of the province. In the administrative region of Mauricie, the patronymic Veillette represents 0.55% of the population. In the Mékinac Regional County Municipality, the surname Veillette accounts for 1.36% of the population; MRC Le Centre-de-la-Mauricie Regional County Municipality, 0.47%; MRC of Francheville Regional County Municipality, 0.61%; RCM of Abitibi-Ouest Regional County Municipality, 0.47%.

== Vision, mission and purpose ==
The vision of this association is to allow individuals of Veillet/te surname to know their origin, to write their story and make it known. According to the objects of the letters patent, this association's mission is to:

• Group together the descendants of Jean Veillet (married to Catherine Lariou), a soldier of the Vaudreuil Company;

• to do historical and/or genealogical research on Veillet/te's families in America;

• publish and promote the results of this historical and/or genealogical research;

• coordinate cultural and/or social encounters of the descendants of Veillet/te in America;

• commemorate cultural events and/or historical facts about the Veillet/te families in America, including the tercentenary of Jean Veillet's arrival in America.

The purpose of this association is to achieve its mission beyond what exists as a service offering in society.

== Motto and Coat of Arms ==
Adopted in 1986, the motto "Veille et marche" was proposed by Eugénie Veillette-Dion. After its adoption by the Association, the motto was affixed in the ribbon at the bottom of the coat of arms representing the American Veillet.

Since 1986, the association uses coats of arms that represent the Veillet/te of America.

== Achievements of the Association ==
This association has realized since its foundation in 1986 until 2019, in particular:

• The festivities of the Tricentenary of the arrival of Jean Veillet in America. More than 2,000 people gathered at Sainte-Geneviève-de-Batiscan on August 13–14, 1986.

• Publication of the book "Histoire et généalogie des familles Veillet/te d'Amérique" (History and genealogy of Veillet families of America), 1988, 771 pages, designed by Jacques F. Veillette (historical part), Françoise Veillette (genealogical part) and Hubert Veillette (special biographies). A vast campaign of collection of family records since 1986 had allowed a pooling of historical and genealogical data of families.

• The "Le Pathiskan Bulletin", with 97 issues (including 5 special issues) since 1986. This newsletter has more than 2144 pages published in its 97th issue, including the Spring-Summer 2020 edition.

• From 1986 to 2019, the Association has held 34 Annual General Meetings (AGMs). These AGMs are consistent with annual reunion activities that take place by rotating the various regions of Quebec.

== Main works related to the surname Veillet/te in America ==
- (in French) "Album généalogique: les familles Veillette" (Genealogical album: the families Veillette), by Denis-Paul Veillette (of Sainte-Thècle, Qc), 1983, 70 pages, edited by the author.
- (in French) "Histoire et généalogie des familles Veillet/te d'Amérique" (History and genealogy Families Veillet/te America), 1988, 771 pages, designed by Jacques F. Veillette (historical part), Françoise Veillette (genealogical part) and Hubert Veillette (special biographies), edited by the "Association des Veillet/te d'Amérique inc" (Ref.: ISBN 2-921063-00-X).
- (in French) "Registre, histoire et généalogie des six premières générations des descendants masculins et féminins Veillet/te 1664-1946" (Register, history and genealogy of the first six generations of the male and female descendants Veillet/te 1664-1946), by Françoise Veillette-St-Louis, 2018, 531 pages, edited by the author (Ref.: ISBN 978-2-9809996-3-5).
- (in French) "Jos Noé Veillette and Aurore Cossette: history and genealogy of a family of forest entrepreneurs", by Luc Veillette, Trois-Rivières, APLAB Publishing, 2012, 242 p., edited by the author. (Ref.: ISBN 9782981003027).
- Novella: « A man for three seasons: Jean Veillet sieur de la Plante », 1994, by Paul T Veillette, 119 p., edited by the author. Note: this novel in English was translated into French by Gratien Veillette (Montreal) under the title "Trois étapes d'une destinées: Jean Veillet, Sieur de la Plante" and published in June 1995.

== Others ==
=== Related Articles ===
- Veillet River
- Jean Veillet (1664–1741) is the unique ancestor of Veillet and Veillette of America.

=== External links ===
- (in French) Website of the "Association des Veillet/te d'Amérique" (Veillet/te family Association):
