= Dunnett's test =

Statistical procedure

In statistics, Dunnett's test is a multiple comparison procedure developed by Canadian statistician Charles Dunnett to compare each of a number of treatments with a single control. Multiple comparisons to a control are also referred to as many-to-one comparisons.

== History ==
Dunnett's test was developed in 1955; an updated table of critical values was published in 1964.

=== Multiple comparisons problem ===
The multiple comparisons, multiplicity or multiple testing problem occurs when one considers a set of statistical inferences simultaneously or infers a subset of parameters selected based on the observed values. The major issue in any discussion of multiple-comparison procedures is the question of the probability of Type I errors. Most differences among alternative techniques result from different approaches to the question of how to control these errors. The problem is in part technical; but it is really much more a subjective question of how you want to define the error rate and how large you are willing to let the maximum possible error rate be. Dunnett's test are well known and widely used in multiple comparison procedure for simultaneously comparing, by interval estimation or hypothesis testing, all active treatments with a control when sampling from a distribution where the normality assumption is reasonable. Dunnett's test is designed to hold the family-wise error rate at or below $\alpha$ when performing multiple comparisons of treatment group with control.

=== Uses of Dunnett’s test ===
The original work on Multiple Comparisons problem was made by Tukey and Scheffé. Their method was a general one, which considered all kinds of pairwise comparisons. Tukey's and Scheffé's methods allow any number of comparisons among a set of sample means. On the other hand, Dunnett's test only compares one group with the others, addressing a special case of multiple comparisons problem—pairwise comparisons of multiple treatment groups with a single control group. In the general case, where we compare each of the pairs, we make $k(k-1)\big/2$ comparisons (where k is the number of groups), but in the treatment vs. controls case we will make only $(k-1)$ comparisons. If in the case of treatment and control groups we were to use the more general Tukey's and Scheffé's methods, they can result in unnecessarily wide confidence intervals. Dunnett's test takes into consideration the special structure of comparing treatment against control, yielding narrower confidence intervals.
It is very common to use Dunnett's test in medical experiments, for example comparing blood count measurements on three groups of animals, one of which served as a control while the other two were treated with two different drugs. Another common use of this method is among agronomists: agronomists may want to study the effect of certain chemicals added to the soil on crop yield, so they will leave some plots untreated (control plots) and compare them to the plots where chemicals were added to the soil (treatment plots).

== Formal description of Dunnett's test ==
Dunnett's test is performed by computing a Student's t-statistic for each experimental, or treatment, group where the statistic compares the treatment group to a single control group. Since each comparison has the same control in common, the procedure incorporates the dependencies between these comparisons. In particular, the t-statistics are all derived from the same estimate of the error variance which is obtained by pooling the sums of squares for error across all (treatment and control) groups. The formal test statistic for Dunnett's test is either the largest in absolute value of these t-statistics (if a two-tailed test is required), or the most negative or most positive of the t-statistics (if a one-tailed test is required).

In Dunnett's test we can use a common table of critical values, but more flexible options are nowadays readily available in many statistics packages. The critical values for any given percentage point depend on: whether a one- or- two-tailed test is performed; the number of groups being compared; the overall number of trials.

=== Assumptions ===
The analysis considers the case where the results of the experiment are numerical, and the experiment is performed to compare p treatments with a control group. The results can be summarized as a set of $(p+1)$ calculated means of the sets of observations, $(\bar{X_{0}},...,\bar{X_{p}})$, while $(\bar{X_{1}},...,\bar{X_{p}})$ are referring to the treatment and $\bar{X_{0}}$ is referring to the control set of observations, and $s$ is an independent estimate of the common standard deviation of all $p+1$ sets of observations. All $\bar{X_{i}}$ of the $p+1$ sets of observations are assumed to be independently and normally distributed with a common variance $\sigma^2$ and means $\mu_{i}$. There is also an assumption that there is an available estimate $s^2$ for $\sigma^2$.

=== Calculation ===
Dunnett's test's calculation is a procedure that is based on calculating confidence statements about the true or the expected values of the $p$ differences $\bar{X_{i}}-\bar{X_{0}}$, thus the differences between treatment groups' mean and control group's mean. This procedure ensures that the probability of all $p$ statements $\bar{X_{i}}-\bar{X_{0}}$ being simultaneously correct is equal to a specified value, $P$. When calculating one sided upper (or lower) confidence interval for the true value of the difference between the mean of the treatment and the control group, $P$ constitutes the probability that this actual value will be less than the upper (or greater than the lower) limit of that interval. When calculating two-sided confidence interval, $P$ constitutes the probability that the true value will be between the upper and the lower limits.

First, we will denote the available N observations by $X_{ij}$ when $i=1,...,p$ and $j=1,...,N_{i}$ and estimate the common variance by, for example: $s^2= \frac{\sum_{i=0}^{p}\sum_{j=1}^{N_{i}} (X_{ij}-\bar{X_{i}})^2}{n}$ when $\bar{X_{i}}$ is the mean of group $i$ and $N_{i}$ is the number of observations in group $i$, and $n=\sum_{i=0}^{p} N_{i}-(p+1)$ degrees of freedom. As mentioned before, we would like to obtain separate confidence limits for each of the differences $m_{i}-m_{0}, (i=1,...,p)$ such that the probability that all $p$ confidence intervals will contain the corresponding $m_{i}-m_{0}$ is equal to $P$.

We will consider the general case where there are $p$ treatment groups and one control group. We will write:

$z_{i}= \cfrac{\bar{X_{i}}-\bar{X_{0}}-(m_{i}-m_{0})}{\sqrt{ \cfrac{1}{N_{i}}+ \cfrac{1}{N_{0}}}}$

$D_{i}= \cfrac{\bar{X_{i}}-\bar{X_{0}}-(m_{i}-m_{0})}{s\sqrt{ \cfrac{1}{N_{i}}+ \cfrac{1}{N_{0}}}}$

we will also write: $D_{i}=\frac{z_{i}}{s}$, which follows the Student's t-statistic distribution with n degrees of freedom. The lower confidence limits with joint confidence coefficient $P$ for the $p$ treatment effects $m_{i}-m_{0}, (i=1,...,p)$ will be given by:

$\bar{X_{i}}-\bar{X_{0}}-d_{i}'s\sqrt{ \frac{1}{N_{i}}+\frac{1}{N_{0}}} , i=1,...,p$

and the $p$ constants $d_{i}'$ are chosen so that $Prob(t_{1}<d_{1}',...,t_{p}<d_{p}') = P$. Similarly, the upper limits will be given by:

$\bar{X_{i}}-\bar{X_{0}}+d_{i}'s\sqrt{ \frac{1}{N_{i}}+\frac{1}{N_{0}}} , i=1,...,p$

For bounding $m_{i}-m_{0}$ in both directions, the following interval might be taken:

$\bar{X_{i}}-\bar{X_{0}}\pm d_{i}''s\sqrt{ \frac{1}{N_{i}}+\frac{1}{N_{0}}} , i=1,...,p$

when $d_{i}''$ are chosen to satisfy $Prob(|t_{1}|<d_{1}',...,|t_{p}|<d_{p}') = P$. The solution to those particular values of $d_{i}''$ for two sided test and $d_{i}'$ for one sided test is given in the tables. An updated table of critical values was published in 1964.

== Example: Breaking Strength of Fabric ==
The following example was adapted from one given by Villars and was presented in Dunnett's original paper. The data represent measurements on the breaking strength of fabric treated by three different chemical processes compared with a standard method of manufacture.

Breaking Strength (lbs)
	Standard	Process 1	Process 2	Process 3
1	55	55	55	50
2	47	64	49	44
3	48	64	52	41
Means	50	61	52	45
Variance	19	27	9	21

Dunnett's Test can be calculated by applying the following steps:

1. Input Data with Means and Variances:

- Collect measurements for each group (standard and treatment processes). See the data in the above table for each group's raw numbers, means, and variances.

2. Calculate Pooled Variance $s^2$:

- Compute the pooled variance across all groups. E.g.,
$$\frac{55^2 + 47^2 + 48^2 + 55^2 + \ldots + 41^2 - 3(50^2 + 61^2 + 52^2 + 45^2)}{8} = \frac{152}{8} = 19$$.

3. Calculate Standard Deviation $s$:

- Take the square root of the average variance. E.g.,
$$s = \sqrt{19} = 4.36$$.

4. Calculate Standard Error:

- The following formula gives the standard error for the difference of two means. E.g.,
$$s \sqrt{\frac{2}{N}} = 4.36 \sqrt{\frac{2}{3}} = 3.56$$.

5. Determine Critical Value $t$:

- Use Dunnett's tables to find $t$ for the given degrees of freedom and confidence level. E.g.,

For $p = 3$ and $\text{d.f.} = 8$:

One-sided: $t = 2.42$
Two-sided: $t = 2.88$

6. the quantity which must be added to and/or subtracted from the observed differences between the means to give their confidence limits is denoted as $A$ (this was termed "allowance" by Tukey), and can be calculated as follows:

- Multiply $t$ by the standard error for the difference of two means. E.g.

One-sided:

$$A = 2.42 \times 3.56 = 8.61$$

Two-sided:

$$A = 2.88 \times 3.56 = 10.25$$

7. Compute Confidence Limits:

- Calculate the confidence limits for each process compared to the standard. E.g.,

One-sided Limits:

Process 1:
$$61 - 50 - 8.61 = 2.39 \, \text{lbs}$$
Process 2:
$$52 - 50 - 8.61 = -6.61 \, \text{lbs}$$
Process 3:
$$45 - 50 - 8.61 = -13.61 \, \text{lbs}$$

Two-sided Limits:

Process 1:
$$61 - 50 \pm 10.25 = [0.75, 21.25] \, \text{lbs}$$
Process 2:
$$52 - 50 \pm 10.25 = [-8.25, 12.25] \, \text{lbs}$$
Process 3:
$$45 - 50 \pm 10.25 = [-15.25, 5.25] \, \text{lbs}$$

8. Draw Conclusions:

- Based on the computed confidence limits, make conclusions about each process compared to the standard. E.g.,

One-sided:

Process 1: Breaking strength exceeds the standard by at least 2.39 lbs.
Process 2: Breaking strength does not exceed the standard (negative value).
Process 3: Breaking strength does not exceed the standard (negative value).

Two-sided:

Process 1: Breaking strength exceeds the standard by between 0.75 lbs and 21.25 lbs.
Process 2: Breaking strength is between -8.25 lbs and 12.25 lbs (may or may not exceed the standard).
Process 3: Breaking strength is between -15.25 lbs and 5.25 lbs (may or may not exceed the standard).
