= Stephen H. Norwood =

American historian

Stephen Harlan Norwood (January 20, 1951 – 2023) was an American historian who was professor of history at the University of Oklahoma from 1987 to 2023.

== Education ==
Norwood received his B.A. at Tufts University in 1972, M.A. at Columbia University in 1975, and Ph.D. at Columbia University in 1984. His doctoral dissertation was The making of the trade union woman: work, culture, and organization of telephone operators, 1878-1923.

== Career ==
From 1984 to 1987, Norwood was an instructor at Memphis State University. Norwood then joined the University of Oklahoma as assistant professor of history in 1987. He was promoted to associate professor in 1991 and full professor in 2002.

Norwood's 2009 book The Third Reich in the Ivory Tower: Complicity and Conflict on American Campuses, drew attention even before publication. According to Norwood, "Harvard was involved in active steps that helped legitimate the Nazi regime in the West", and was "indifferent to the prosecution of German Jews and indeed on numerous occasions assisted the Nazis in their efforts to gain acceptance in the West", welcoming one of Adolf Hitler's closest deputies to a reunion, hosting a reception for German naval officials and sending delegates to a celebration at a German university that had expelled Jews, while failing to condemn the policies of Hitler's regime.

Norwood's most recent book is Antisemitism and the American Far Left. This is the first systematic study of the American far-left's role in both promoting and combating antisemitism. The book covers both the Old Left and New Left, including the latter's black nationalist allies. It also examines antisemitism in the contemporary far-left, including its relationships with Islamists.

== Personal life ==
Norwood was born in Washington, D.C. in 1951; he was Jewish. His parents were economists; his mother Janet Lippe Norwood was commissioner of the Bureau of Labor Statistics from 1979 to 1991. His paternal grandmother Rose Finkelstein Norwood, who was born to a Jewish family in Kyiv, Russian Empire (in modern Ukraine) in 1889, was a labor activist and founder of the Boston Telephone Operators Union.

In 1975, Stephen Norwood married Eunice Pollack. Norwood died in 2023.

== Books ==
- Norwood, Stephen H. (2021). Prologue to Annihilation: Ordinary American and British Jews Challenge the Third Reich. Bloomington: Indiana University Press. ISBN 978-0-253-05361-9.
- Norwood, Stephen H. (2013). Antisemitism and the American Far Left. New York: Cambridge University Press. ISBN 978-1-107-03601-7.
- Norwood, Stephen H. (2009). The Third Reich in the Ivory Tower: Complicity and Conflict on American Campuses. New York: Cambridge University Press. ISBN 978-0-521-76243-4.
- Norwood, Stephen H. (2002). Strikebreaking and Intimidation: Mercenaries and Masculinity in Twentieth-Century America. Chapel Hill: University of North Carolina Press. ISBN 0-8078-2705-3.
- Norwood, Stephen H. (1990). Labor's Flaming Youth: Telephone Operators and Worker Militancy, 1878 - 1923. Urbana: University of Illinois Press. ISBN 0-252-01633-5.
- Norwood, Stephen H. (2004). Real Football: Conversations on America's Game. Jackson: University Press of Mississippi. ISBN 978-1-57806-662-9.
- Norwood, Stephen H.; Pollack, Eunice G., eds. (2007). Encyclopedia of American Jewish History. Santa Barbara, CA: ABC-CLIO. ISBN 978-1-85109-638-1.

== Awards ==
- Herbert G. Gutman Award in American Social History, 1990
- SABR/Macmillan Award
- Finalist, National Jewish Book Award for Holocaust Studies, 2009
