= Rose Finkelstein Norwood =

American labor organizer

- Finkelstein and Hyman Norwood c. 1916
- Born: Rose Finkelstein; September 10, 1890; Kiev, Russian Empire (now Kyiv, Ukraine)
- Died: September 25, 1980 (aged 90); Boston
- Resting place: Sharon Memorial Park, Massachusetts
- Other name: Rose Norwood
- Education: Bryn Mawr Summer School for Women Workers in Industry, Brookwood Labor College
- Occupations: trade worker, labor organizer
- Spouse: Hyman Norwood
- Children: 2
- Relatives: Stephen H. Norwood (grandson)

Rose Finkelstein Norwood (September 10, 1890 – September 25, 1980) was an American labor organizer. During her long career she led labor campaigns for telephone operators, garment and jewelry workers, boiler makers, library staffers, teachers, sales clerks, and laundry workers. She was active in many labor and civil rights organizations, including the Boston Women's Trade Union League, the Women's International League for Peace and Freedom, and the National Association for the Advancement of Colored People. She was a vocal opponent of antisemitism, racism, and fascism, a lifelong supporter of women's rights and workers' education, and an advocate for the elderly.

== Early life ==
Rose Finkelstein was born on September 10, 1890, in Kiev, Russian Empire (now Kyiv, Ukraine) the second of eight children of Henry Finkelstein, a Jewish distillery worker, and Fanny Schafferman. Her family moved to the United States when she was a year old. (Note: Some sources list her birthplace as Kiev and her birth year as 1889. According to her Boston Globe obituary, she was born in Boston's Roxbury neighborhood and was 89 when she died in 1980.) The family settled initially in East Cambridge, Massachusetts, before moving to the Jamaica Plain neighborhood of Boston. She attended Jamaica Plain High School until her senior year, when she quit school to work as a telephone operator for New England Telephone.

As a child in East Cambridge, Rose was bullied by Irish-American youths who yelled "Christ Killer" and threw bricks at her as she walked to school. During one such attack she suffered a serious head wound, and one of her assailants was subsequently sent to prison. The family was forced to move to a less hostile neighborhood. The experience had a lasting influence on Rose, making her more sensitive to oppression and informing her anti-fascist, Zionist beliefs.

== Career ==
She became a charter member of the Boston Telephone Operators Union in 1912. In 1919 she helped lead 8,000 telephone operators in a six-day strike that paralyzed telephone service throughout New England. Despite a lack of support from TOU's male union leaders, the predominately female operators won major concessions: their wages were increased, split shifts were abolished, and their right to organize was guaranteed.

In 1921 she attended the Bryn Mawr Summer School for Women Workers in Industry, an alternative educational program for women workers. While at Bryn Mawr she joined other students in demanding that the college meet trade union standards in its treatment of black employees. In 1928 and 1935, she attended summer school at the Brookwood Labor College in New York, where she studied organizing techniques and "how to raise the trade-union child". The latter course inspired her to found a Boston chapter of the Child Study Association. She also took classes at the Boston Trade Union College.

During the 1920s she was active in the Women's Trade Union League (WTUL), the Women's International League for Peace and Freedom, and groups defending the Italian-American anarchists Sacco and Vanzetti. As a member of the WTUL she campaigned for women's rights, including the right to continue working after marriage. In 1924, she moderated a forum in which Jennie Loitman Barron, then a young lawyer, spoke about the need to include women in juries. (Women were not allowed to serve on Massachusetts juries until 1949.)

In the 1930s and 40s, Norwood was one of the most prominent female organizers in the American labor movement. In 1937, after leading several successful campaigns for telegraphers, she led a series of contentious strikes for the Boston Laundry Workers Union. At Lewandos Laundry in Watertown, Massachusetts, while fighting for equal pay for black workers, she was arrested in a picket line clash. Later she worked for the Ladies' Garment Workers' Union, the International Jewelry Workers' Union, the American Federation of State, County and Municipal Employees, the Retail Clerks International Union, and the Service Employees International Union, leading campaigns throughout New England and Pennsylvania while facing police dogs, tear gas, and harsh winter weather. She organized the clerks at the Jordan Marsh department store in Boston, and workers at the Boston Public Library. Her involvement with librarians inspired her to start the Books for Workers program, in which public libraries provided books to union halls and factories.

Norwood became an officer in the Boston WTUL during the 1930s, and served as its president from 1941 to 1950. In 1942, because of her experience with interracial labor organizing, she was appointed to the advisory board of the Boston chapter of the National Association for the Advancement of Colored People. During World War II she campaigned for taxpayer-funded daycare for children of mothers employed in the war industry. As a member of the Boston Herald Rumor Clinic, headed by Gordon Allport, she worked to combat antisemitism, racism, and Nazi propaganda. As a member of the Massachusetts Citizens Committee for Racial Understanding, she organized opposition to a surge in local antisemitic violence. After the war, she urged organized labor to protect women's jobs; campaigned for equal pay for Boston's women teachers; lobbied for legislation to allow refugees, including Holocaust survivors, to immigrate to the United States; served as a member of the Massachusetts Committee for the Marshall Plan; and became involved in the Labor Zionist cause.

In the 1970s she advocated for the rights of senior citizens, and was appointed by Mayor Kevin White to Boston's Advisory Commission on Elderly Affairs.

== Personal life ==
On December 25, 1921, Finkelstein married a fellow Russian Jewish immigrant named Hyman Norwood, who owned a tire and battery store in Roxbury. The couple had two children, Bernard and Barbara. At their mother's insistence, the children were raised in Mattapan, which was then a Jewish neighborhood. Rose Norwood died of a heart attack on September 25, 1980, at her home in the Hotel Vendome in Boston's Back Bay and was buried in Sharon Memorial Park in Sharon, Massachusetts. Her grandson, Stephen H. Norwood, is a noted historian and author.

Rose Norwood is remembered in connection with the WTUL on the Boston Women's Heritage Trail.
