= Johanna G. Nešlehová =

Czech mathematical statistician

- Born: July 26, 1977 (age 48); Prague, Czech Republic
- Education: Charles University; University of Hamburg; University of Oldenburg
- Spouse: Christian Genest
- Scientific career
- Institutions: ETH Zürich; McGill University; Vienna University of Economics and Business
- Doctoral advisor: Dietmar Pfeifer

Johanna G. Nešlehová (born July 26, 1977) is a Czech mathematical statistician who works in Canada at McGill University as a professor in the department of mathematics and statistics. Her research interests include copulas, extreme value theory, multivariate statistics, and operational risk.

== Education and career ==
Nešlehová is originally from Prague, the daughter of painter Pavel Nešleha and art historian Mahulena Nešlehová. She studied at the Charles University, the University of Hamburg, and the University of Oldenburg, earning a degree (vordiplom) from University of Hamburg in 1999, a master's degree (diplom) from the University of Hamburg in 2000, and a doctorate from the University of Oldenburg in 2004. Her dissertation, Dependence of Non-continuous Random Variables, was supervised by Dietmar Pfeifer.

After working as a postdoctoral researcher and Heinz Hopf Lecturer at ETH Zürich, she joined the McGill University faculty in 2009. Since October 2022 she is also a professor at WU Vienna University of Economics and Business.

== Book ==
With Erhard Cramer, Nešlehová is the author of a German-language undergraduate textbook in introductory mathematics, Vorkurs Mathematik: Arbeitsbuch zum Studienbeginn in Bachelor-Studiengängen (Springer, 2005; 7th ed., 2018).

== Recognition ==
Nešlehová was named as an Elected Member of the International Statistical Institute in 2011. In 2020 she was named a Fellow of the Institute of Mathematical Statistics.

She was the 2019 winner of the CRM-SSC Prize in Statistics "for fundamental contributions to multivariate statistics, and in particular stochastic dependence modeling and extreme-value theory, and for her efforts to promote the sound application of statistics in risk management".

In 2023, Nešlehová was the second statistician (after Nancy Reid in 1995) to receive the Krieger–Nelson Prize of the Canadian Mathematical Society.

== Personal life ==
Nešlehová is married to statistician Christian Genest. Their son Richard Genest was born in 2014. Johanna became a Canadian citizen in 2015.
