= Charles Dunnett =

Canadian statistician

Charles William Dunnett (24 August 1921 – May 18, 2007) was a Canadian statistician. He was the Statistical Society of Canada 1986 Gold Medalist and Professor Emeritus of the Departments of Mathematics, Statistics, Clinical Epidemiology, and Biostatistics of McMaster University.

Two of his papers are listed among the top 25 most-cited papers in statistics (numbers 14 and 21 in the list). In 1965 he was elected as a Fellow of the American Statistical Association.

Dunnett died on 18 May 2007 from lymphoma.

== See also ==
- Dunnett's test
