= Cathryn S. Dippo =

American statistician

Cathryn S. Dippo is an American statistician. She became a fellow of the American Statistical Association in 1989.

== Education ==
She obtained a Ph.D. in mathematical statistics from George Washington University.

== Work ==
In the mid-1980s she began the National Science Foundation/American Statistical Association/BLS Senior Research Fellow Program. In the late 1980s she began the BLS Behavioral Science Research Center. She retired as associate commissioner of the Office of Survey Methods Research at the Bureau of Labor Statistics in the first decade of the 2000s. While at the Bureau of Labor Statistics she also chaired the Current Population Survey Redesign and the FedStats R&D Working Group.

She also worked as a referee for statistical journals.

== Affiliations ==
From 1985 to 1986 she was a chairperson of the methodology section of the Washington Statistical Society (WSS); the WSS is a chapter of the American Statistical Association. From 1986 to 1988 she was a representative-at-large of the WSS. In 1989 she became a Fellow of the American Statistical Association, which she also became a lifetime member of at some point. She served as president of the WSS from 1989 to 1990. She was a Curtis Jacobs Memorial Award Coordinator for the WSS, and on their Curtis Jacobs Memorial Committee, from 1991 to 1993. In 1991 she also received the WSS Presidents' Award as part of the ASA-150 Committee. From 1992 to 1993 she was on the WSS's Committee on ASA Fellows.

She also became a member of the Caucus for Women in Statistics.
