= Mary E. Thompson =

Canadian statistician

- Education: University of Toronto; University of Illinois
- Known for: Survey methodology and statistical sampling
- Awards: Fellow of the Royal Society of Canada 2006; Fellow of the American Statistical Association 1985
- Scientific career
- Fields: Statistics
- Workplaces: University of Waterloo
- Thesis: Some Aspects of Optimal Stopping Theory (1969)
- Doctoral advisor: Joseph L. Doob

Mary Elinore Thompson OC FRSC is a Canadian statistician. She is Distinguished Professor Emerita of Statistics and Actuarial Science at the University of Waterloo, the former president of the Statistical Society of Canada, and the founding scientific director of the Canadian Statistical Sciences Institute. Her research interests include survey methodology and statistical sampling; she is also known for her work applying statistics to guide tobacco control policy.

== Education and career ==
Thompson studied mathematics at the University of Toronto. She went to the University of Illinois at Urbana–Champaign for graduate study, earning a master's degree and her Ph.D. there. Her 1969 dissertation, supervised by Joseph L. Doob, was Some Aspects of Optimal Stopping Theory. From the completion of her doctorate to her retirement, she was a faculty member at the University of Waterloo. She was president of the Statistical Society of Canada for 2003–2004, and has been a director at the Canadian Statistical Sciences Institute since 2012.

Thompson is the author of Theory of Sample Surveys (Chapman & Hall, 1997).

== Recognition ==
Thompson was elected as a Fellow of the American Statistical Association in 1985, and of the Royal Society of Canada in 2006. She is also an elected member of the International Statistical Institute and a Fellow of the Institute of Mathematical Statistics. She won the Waksberg Award of Survey Methodology in 2008.

The Statistical Society of Canada awarded her their Gold Medal in 2003, the Lise Manchester Award (with Geoffrey Fong, David Hammond) in 2006, for their work on tobacco, and their Distinguished Service Award in 2014. The Committee of Presidents of Statistical Societies gave her their Elizabeth L. Scott Award in 2010 "for outstanding contributions in research, teaching, and service that have served to inspire women statisticians; for encouraging women at all levels to seek careers in statistics; for excellence in graduate student supervision and mentorship; and for her leadership to minimize gender-based inequalities in employment."

In 2026, she was named as an Officer of the Order of Canada.
