= Jean-Baptiste Veillet-Dufrêche =

French politician

Jean-Baptiste Veillet-Dufreche
- Born: 16 November 1838; Moncontour (Côtes-d'Armor)
- Died: 13 December 1892 (aged 54); Saint-Brieuc (Côtes-d'Armor)
- Parents: Jean-Baptiste Veillet-Dufreche (father); Victorine Allenou (mother)

Jean-Baptiste Veillet-Dufreche is a French politician born on November 16, 1838 in Moncontour (Côtes-d'Armor) and died on December 13, 1892 at Saint-Brieuc (Côtes-d'Armor).

== Biography ==
Jean-Baptiste Veillet-Dufreche is the son of Jean-Baptiste Veillet-Dufreche (1802-1874), master of ironworks and mayor of Moncontour, and Victorine Allenou (sister of Jean-Marie Allenou). His brother is Louis Monjaret de Kerjégu's son-in-law, and one of his sisters is Jean Garnier-Bodéléac's wife.

Conservative candidate, he was elected member of Parliament in February 1876, but his election was invalidated and he was defeated in April 1876. Once again elected as a member of Parliament in October 1877, he was again invalidated and defeated in the ensuing by-election in 1878 He is mayor of Coëtlogon from 1884 to 1892.

== Sources ==
- "Jean-Baptiste Veillet-Dufrêche", in Adolphe Robert and Gaston Cougny, Dictionnaire des parlementaires français (1789–1891), Bourloton, Paris, 1889 Edition details Wikisource
