= Alexandra M. Schmidt =

Brazilian biostatistician

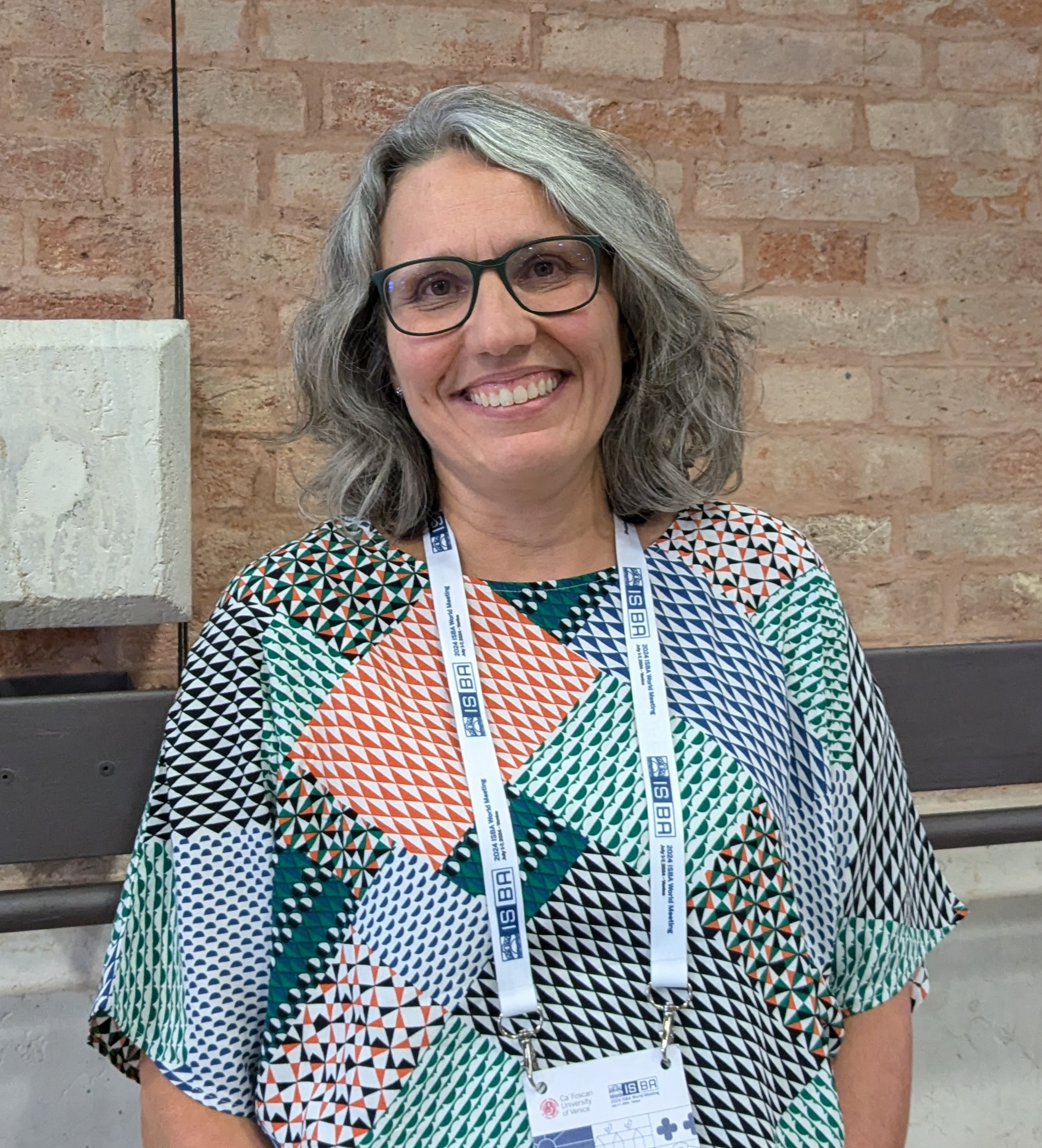
- Alexandra Schmidt in 2024
- Education: Federal University of Rio de Janeiro; University of Sheffield
- Scientific career
- Fields: Biostatistics
- Institutions: McGill University; Federal University of Rio de Janeiro
- Thesis: Bayesian Spatial Interpolation of Pollution Monitoring Stations (2001)
- Doctoral advisor: Tony O'Hagan
- Website: alex-schmidt.research.mcgill.ca

Alexandra M. (Alex) Schmidt is a Brazilian statistician who works as a professor of biostatistics at McGill University in Canada. She is known for her research on spatiotemporal and multivariate statistics and their applications in environmental statistics and epidemiology.

== Education and career ==
Schmidt earned bachelor's and master's degrees in statistics at the Federal University of Rio de Janeiro in 1994 and 1996 respectively. She completed her Ph.D. in statistics in 2001 at the University of Sheffield. Her dissertation, Bayesian Spatial Interpolation of Pollution Monitoring Stations, was supervised by Tony O'Hagan.

She was a faculty member at the Federal University of Rio de Janeiro before moving to McGill in 2016.

== Recognition ==
Schmidt became an Elected Member of the International Statistical Institute in 2010. She was president of the International Society for Bayesian Analysis for the 2015 term. She was elected as a Fellow of the American Statistical Association in 2020.

In 2017 the Section on Statistics and the Environment of the American Statistical Association gave Schmidt their Distinguished Achievement Medal "for fundamental contributions to the development of spatio-temporal process theory, most notably to the theory of multivariate processes through coregionalization as well as the modelling of spatial covariance matrices; for related applications to the environmental and ecological science, and for service to the profession."

== Publications ==
- An Adaptive resampling scheme for cycle estimation, 1998
- Spatial stochastic frontier models : accounting for unobserved local determinants of inefficiency, 2006
