= Jean Veillet (1664–1741) =

Jean Veillet (1664, born in Saint-André-de-Niort, France - 1741 death at Sainte-Geneviève-de-Batiscan, Quebec, Canada) is the unique ancestor of Veillet and Veillette of America.

Jean Veillet was a soldier of the Vaudreuil Company when he arrived in Canada, then a farmer and a forest contractor.

Jean Veillet was married on November 19, 1698, in Batiscan, Quebec to Catherine Lariou (born January 26, 1683, in Batiscan, Qc). The eleven children born of this union are baptized in Batiscan; they married at Sainte-Geneviève-de-Batiscan, except Gervais Veillet (in Sainte-Anne-de-la-Pérade) and Jean-Baptiste (2nd marriage in Verchères).

== Summary biography ==
After growing up in Niort, in Poitou (France), Jean Veillet served as a soldier in the navy troops, later referred to as the "Compagnies franches de la marine". These are autonomous infantry companies attached to the "Ministère de la marine (Ministry of the Navy). He was a Huguenot. He signed on the act of abjuration on April 24, 1685 at the age of 21 years. He crossed the Atlantic on a sailing ship in 1687 to reach the city of Quebec (Canada).

After his marriage in 1698, Jean Veillet settled around 1700 on a lot of land in Sainte-Geneviève-de-Batiscan (Quebec) with the status of "squatter". Its right of property ownership was regularized in 1708 and 1711 by notarial act.

== Evolution of the surname Veillet/te in America ==
His descendants continued to use the surname "Veillet" authentic, either the usual spelling; then as of the middle of the nineteenth century, Catholic priests generally adopted the scripture "Veillette" on the acts of baptisms. Today its two patronymic variants are found side by side in America. In addition, certain spelling variants of the patronymic have been listed in the English-speaking community in America.

== American Veillet Association inc ==
The Association des Veillet/te d'Amérique (Veillet/te families Association) obtained its letters patent on March 12, 1986, under the third part of the Quebec Companies Act. It is a non-profit organization made up of the descendants of the couple Jean Veillet (1664–1741) and Catherine Lariou (1683-1756), as well as their related persons.

== Annexes ==
=== Related Articles ===
- Veillet River
- Calvaire de la Rivière-à-Veillet
- Association des Veillet/te d'Amérique (Veillet/te families Association)

=== External links ===
- Website of the Association of Veillet/te families Association:
