= Agnes M. Herzberg =

Canadian statistician (1938–2026)

Agnes Margaret Herzberg
- Born: Agnes Margaret Herzberg; December 12, 1938; Saskatoon, Saskatchewan, Canada
- Died: June 2, 2026 (aged 87); Kingston, Ontario, Canada
- Known for: President of the Statistical Society of Canada (1991–1992); Statistical Society of Canada - Distinguished Service Award (1999)
- Parent(s): Gerhard Herzberg (father); Luise Oettinger (mother)
- Awards: Fellow of the American Statistical Association (1983)

Academic background
- Education: Queen's University; University of Saskatchewan
- Doctoral advisor: Norman Shklov

Agnes Margaret Herzberg (December 12, 1938 – June 2, 2026) was a Canadian statistician who worked as a professor of mathematics and statistics at Queen's University. She was president of the Statistical Society of Canada for 1991–1992, its first female president.

== Background ==
Herzberg was born in Saskatoon, Saskatchewan in 1938. She was the daughter of German-Canadian physicist Gerhard Herzberg and spectroscopist Luise Oettinger.

Herzberg died on June 2, 2026, at the age of 87.

== Education and career ==
Herzberg did her undergraduate studies at Queen's University before earning master's and doctoral degrees from the University of Saskatchewan, under the supervision of Norman Shklov. She took an Overseas Fellowship in 1966, taking her to England, and remained at Imperial College London until 1988, when she returned to Queen's as a professor.

Beyond her work in statistics, Herzberg also used graph coloring and chromatic polynomials to analyze the mathematics of Sudoku.

== Honours and awards ==
In 1983 she was elected as a Fellow of the American Statistical Association. She became a fellow of the American Association for the Advancement of Science in 1990. She was also a Fellow of the Institute of Mathematical Statistics and an Elected Member of the International Statistical Institute. In 1999 the Statistical Society of Canada gave her their Distinguished Service Award, the first to a woman, and in 2007 the society named her as an Honorary Member "for fundamental contributions to the design of experiments, applied statistics and data analysis; for her organization and leadership of conferences on statistics, science and public policy, and for dedicated service to the international statistical community". Additionally, a conference in her honour was held at Queen's University in 2004.

== Publications ==
- An introduction to wavelets with applications to Andrews (Journal of Computational and Applied Mathematics, November 1995, doi:10.1016/0377-0427(95)00005-4
- Identifying Which Sets of Parameters are Simultaneously Estimable in an Incomplete Factorial Design (Journal of the Royal Statistical Society Series D (The Statistician), January 1995, doi:10.2307/2348894)
- An optimal experimental design for the Haar regression model (Canadian Journal of Statistics, September 1994, doi:10.2307/3315597)
- Incomplete factorial designs for randomized clinical trials (Statistics in Medicine, September 1993, doi:10.1002/sim.4780121708)
- Optimum Experimental Designs for Properties of a Compartmental Model (Biometrics, July 1993, doi:10.2307/2532547)
- Discussion of the paper «The foundation of experimental design and observation» by H. P. Wynn (Journal of the Italian Statistical Society, June 1993, doi:10.1007/BF02589237)
- Erratum: Cage Allocation Designs for Rodent Carcinogenicity Experiments (Environmental Health Perspectives, August 1992, doi:10.2307/3431232)
- Cage allocation designs for rodent carcinogenicity experiments (Environmental Health Perspectives, July 1992, doi:10.1289/ehp.97-1519551)
