= Pierre Cabanne =

French art historian

Pierre Cabanne (September 23, 1921, in Carcassonne – January 24, 2007, in Meudon) was a French art historian. He is best remembered for his extensive research and writings on the art history of painters Rembrandt, Edgar Degas, Van Gogh, and Picasso. He also authored a book on his interviews with Marcel Duchamp.

== Biography ==
A journalist, Pierre Cabanne contributes to Combat and the daily Le Matin de Paris, as well as to numerous art magazines and the radio station France Culture.

A specialist in Pablo Picasso, to whom he dedicated a sum (Le Siècle de Picasso, 1979, four volumes), he left a large number of books covering the history of art, particularly Contemporary art.

In 1966 he published a book of Entretiens avec Marcel Duchamp, shortly before the artist's death. His books are based on extensive documentation and research, such as La Chambre de Joë Bousquet, located in Carcassonne, in which he investigates a famous Surrealist collection dispersed in the 1950s.

In La Main et l'esprit (2002), he examines the relationship between artists and writers from the 18th century to the present day. He is also interested in Les Grands Collectionneurs (2004).

Pierre Cabanne also knows how to be a polemicist, as in Merde aux critiques (1993), which examines "the tribulations of art criticism from Émile Zola to Pierre Ménard", or in his essay Le Pouvoir culturel sous la Ve République (1981), which he refused to update beyond 1981 despite repeated requests from his friends.

Professor at the École nationale supérieure des arts décoratifs in Paris, he is the author of popular works such as the Guide des musées de France (1984), which describes 2,000 establishments and won the national tourist guide prize, the Dictionnaire des arts (2000), and the Dictionnaire des petits maîtres de la peinture (2003), in collaboration with Gérald Schurr.

In 2016 a conference organized by the Institut National d'Histoire de l'Art was held in Paris, entitled "Pierre Cabanne, un critique et ses archives".

He is buried in the Fanjeaux(Aude) cemetery.
