= Journal of Multivariate Analysis =

- Discipline: Multivariate statistics
- Language: English
- Edited by: Christian Genest

Publication details
- History: 1971–present
- Publisher: Elsevier
- Frequency: Monthly
- Impact factor: 1.009 (2017)

Standard abbreviations
- ISO 4: J. Multivar. Anal.
- MathSciNet: J. Multivariate Anal.

Indexing
- CODEN: JMVAAI
- ISSN: 0047-259X
- LCCN: 71649078
- OCLC no.: 01783582

Links
- Journal homepage; Online access

The Journal of Multivariate Analysis is a monthly peer-reviewed scientific journal that covers applications and research in the field of multivariate statistical analysis. The journal's scope includes theoretical results as well as applications of new theoretical methods in the field. Some of the research areas covered include copula modeling, functional data analysis, graphical modeling, high-dimensional data analysis, image analysis, multivariate extreme-value theory, sparse modeling, and spatial statistics.

According to the Journal Citation Reports, the journal has a 2017 impact factor of 1.009.

== See also ==
- List of statistics journals
