= Centre des loisirs Michel-Veillette =

Recreational center in Trois-Rivières, Quebec

Michel-Veillet recreational center
- Centre des loisirs Michel-Veillet
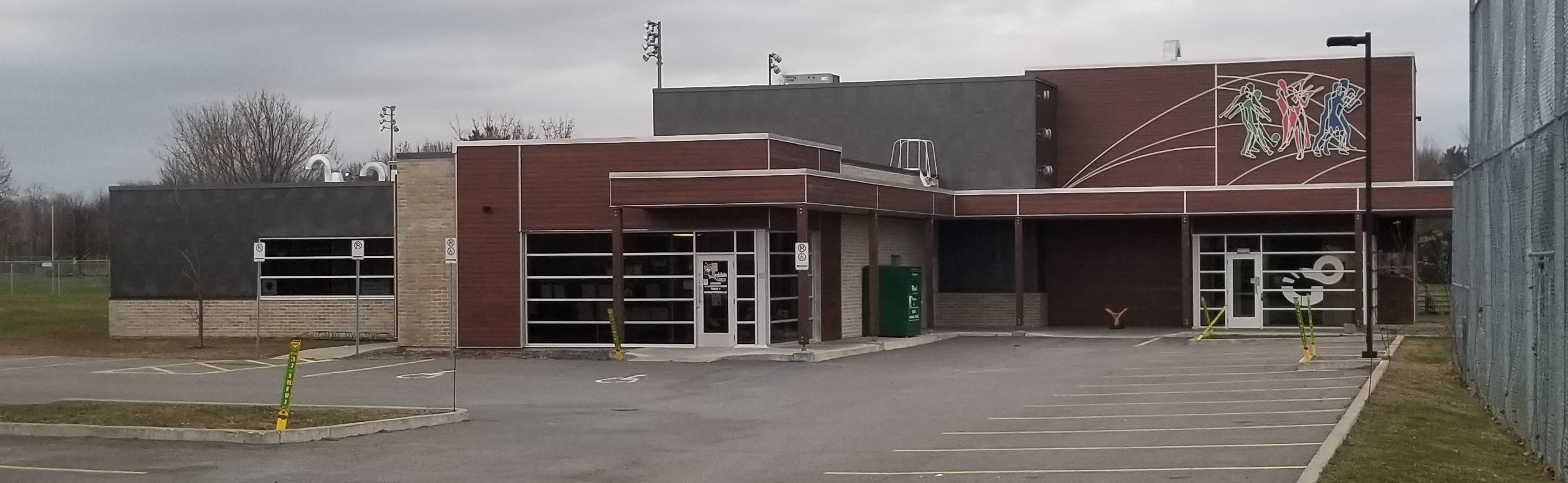

- Location within Quebec
- Location: Trois-Rivières, Quebec, Canada
- Coordinates: 46°17′18″N 72°40′24″W
- Created: November 2014
- Operator: City of Trois-Rivières

The centre des loisirs Michel-Veillette (English: Michel-Veillette recreational center) is a complex fitted out for sports and other types of leisure activities, which is located at 10607 chemin Sainte-Marguerite, in the Pointe-du-Lac borough of Trois-Rivières, Quebec, Canada. This leisure center is located behind the fire station and adjoins the Parc des Seigneurs in the city of Trois-Rivières.

Since its opening in November 2014, the Michel-Veillette leisure complex has provided premises for social groups in Pointe-du-Lac. This building dedicated to the leisure of social groups was inaugurated on October 12, 2015.

== Building ==
The construction of this recreation center was announced at a press conference on April 23, 2012 by the authorities of the city of Trois-Rivières. Finally, this leisure center cost nearly $2 million; the Government of Quebec contributed with approximately $852,000.

A colorful work of art by artist Daniel Dutil, personifying three moving characters, was affixed to the facade of the recreation center. This work represents athletes from Trois-Rivières, including soccer player Pascale Pinard and boxer Mikaël Zewski. This could have been done by the artist using the chronophotography technique which consists of taking several photos, in order to faithfully represent the movements of the athletes.

== Toponymy ==
The toponym center des loisirs Michel-Veillette evokes the memory of Michel Veillet (1945-2019). He distinguished himself in the public space by his great involvement in the organization of sports and leisure in Pointe-du-Lac. He was in particular the instigator of this leisure center project.

As the owner of a garage (bodywork and dent removal) operated since 1973 and established on route 138 in Pointe-du-Lac, Michel Veillette has repeatedly sponsored given ball teams and broomball; then he supported the baseball team "Les Seigneurs" of Pointe-du-Lac in the CBRM. He has coached minor hockey teams and also helped establish soccer in Pointe-du-Lac. With other Pointe-du-Lac volunteers, he set up the non-profit organization "Les Seigneurs". This organization provides the equipment necessary for the practice of their respective sport to young less favored athletes. This work manifests itself either for the benefit of young sports or for portable teams. This organization also supports the sports initiatives or projects of the Pointe-du-Lac school. This organization redistributes the profits to sports or community organizations in the community.

Michel Veillette was also president of the Trois-Rivières bingo group and established the Pointe-du-Lac bingo concertation table. As Chair of the Pointe-du-Lac Recreation Committee, Michel Veillette was involved in the construction of the Pavillon des Seigneurs sports complex, located at 10 555 chemin Sainte-Marguerite, with the collaboration of Yvon Picotte, MPP for that time, as well as the development of the sports grounds surrounding this pavilion.

In addition, Michel Veillette was a municipal councilor from 2001 to 2013, representing the district of Pointe-du-Lac in the new city of Trois-Rivières, after the effective municipal amalgamation on January 1, 2002. During his first mandate, he s is greatly involved in the organization of public transportation in Pointe-du-Lac. In the city of Trois-Rivières, he is among the municipal councilors with the largest number of committees and designations. He has notably served on the working group on regional development and planning, the urban planning advisory committee, the regional recreation and sports unit, the working group on recreation, sport and community services, to the committee on sport and leisure tourism, to the working group on public works, to that of technical services, to the traffic committee as well as to the committee of the Grand Prix of Trois-Rivières.

Michel Veillette received the National Assembly of Quebec medal on May 30, 2018 by the deputy Marc Plante in the presence of the Premier of Quebec, Philippe Couillard.

Native of Quebec City, Michel Veillette lived his youth in Saint-Stanislas and Sainte-Anne-de-la-Pérade. His family has lived in Pointe-du-Lac since 1973 in the Baie-Jolie area. Michel Veillette really retired at the end of 2013, that is to say at the end of his third mandate as municipal councilor.
