= Rolleboise =

- Commune
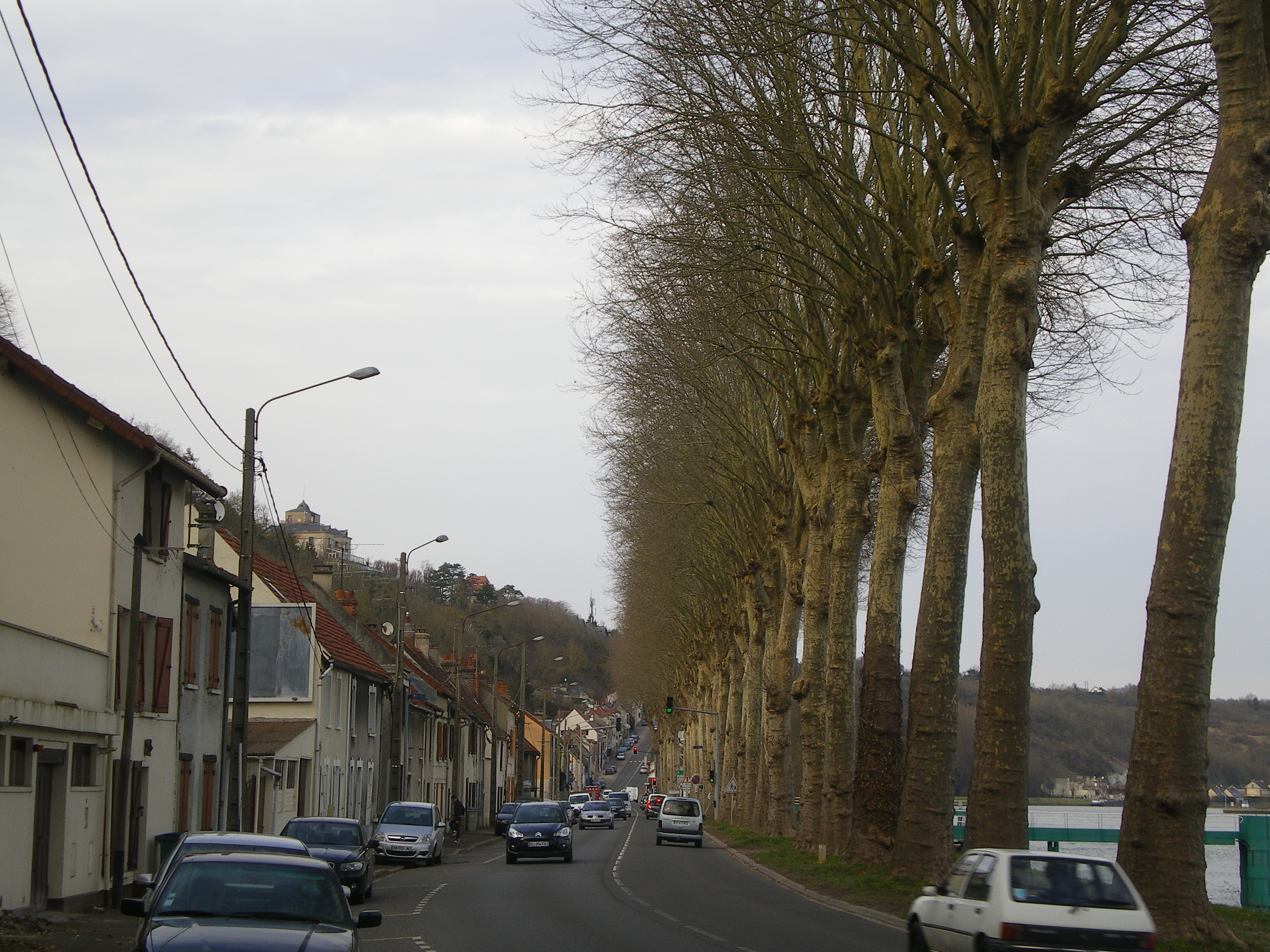
- The former RN13 road, in Rolleboise

- Coat of arms
- Location of Rolleboise
- Location within France Location within Île-de-France (region)
- Coordinates: 49°01′11″N 1°36′30″E
- Country: France
- Region: Île-de-France
- Department: Yvelines
- Arrondissement: Mantes-la-Jolie
- Canton: Bonnières-sur-Seine
- Intercommunality: CU Grand Paris Seine et Oise

Government
  - Mayor (2024–2026): Yvette Brunet
- Area^{1}: 2.96 km^{2} (1.14 sq mi)
- Elevation: 60 m (200 ft)
- Highest elevation: 123 m (404 ft)
- Lowest elevation: 15 m (49 ft)
- Population (2023): 346
  - Density: 117/km^{2} (303/sq mi)
- Time zone: UTC+01:00 (CET)
  - Summer (DST): UTC+02:00 (CEST)
- INSEE/Postal code: 78528 /78270
- ^{1} French Land Register data, which excludes lakes, ponds, glaciers > 1 km^{2} (0.386 sq mi or 247 acres) and river estuaries.

Rolleboise (French pronunciation: [ʁɔlbwaz]) is a commune in the Yvelines department in the Île-de-France region in north-central France.

== See also ==
- Communes of the Yvelines department
