= Ézy-sur-Eure =

- Commune
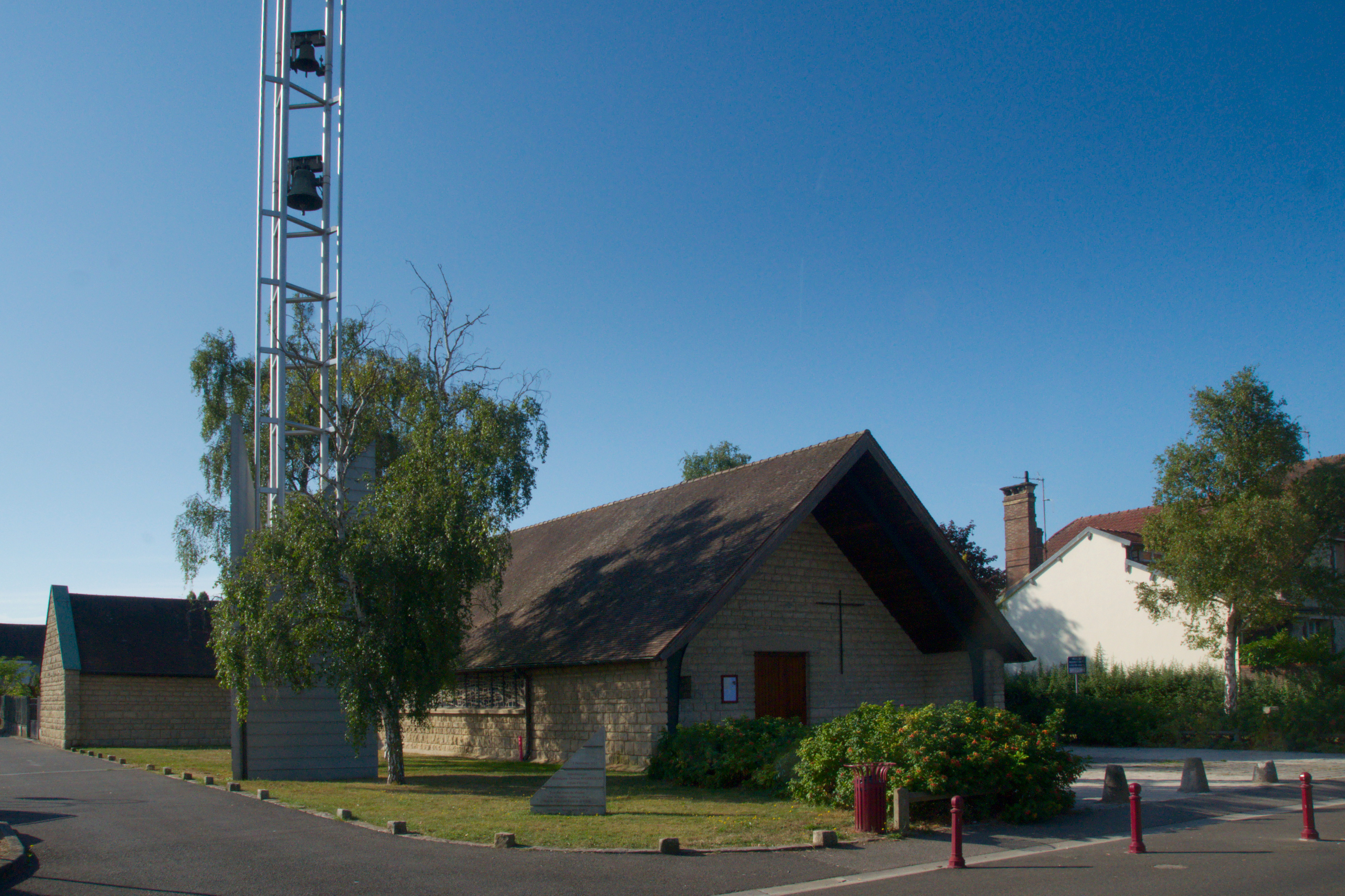
- The church in Ézy-sur-Eure

- Coat of arms
- Location of Ézy-sur-Eure
- Location within France Location within Normandy
- Coordinates: 48°51′54″N 1°25′14″E
- Country: France
- Region: Normandy
- Department: Eure
- Arrondissement: Évreux
- Canton: Saint-André-de-l'Eure
- Intercommunality: Pays de Dreux

Government
  - Mayor (2020–2026): Pierre Leportier
- Area^{1}: 8.92 km^{2} (3.44 sq mi)
- Elevation: 62 m (203 ft)
- Highest elevation: 132 m (433 ft)
- Lowest elevation: 57 m (187 ft)
- Population (2023): 3,644
  - Density: 409/km^{2} (1,060/sq mi)
- Demonym: Ézéens
- Time zone: UTC+01:00 (CET)
  - Summer (DST): UTC+02:00 (CEST)
- INSEE/Postal code: 27230 /27530
- Website: ezysureure.fr
- ^{1} French Land Register data, which excludes lakes, ponds, glaciers > 1 km^{2} (0.386 sq mi or 247 acres) and river estuaries.

Ézy-sur-Eure (French pronunciation: [ezi syʁ œʁ]; lit. 'Ézy-on-Eure'), colloquially known simply as Ézy, is a commune in the Eure department in the Normandy region in northern France. It is on the departmental border with Eure-et-Loir, which mainly follows the river Eure, just northwest of the town of Anet.

== Population ==
Historical population
Year	Pop.	±% p.a.
1968	2,023	—
1975	2,167	+0.99%
1982	2,461	+1.83%
1990	2,805	+1.65%
1999	3,087	+1.07%
2007	3,134	+0.19%
2012	3,344	+1.31%
2017	3,670	+1.88%
2023	3,644	−0.12%
Source: INSEE

== See also ==
- Communes of the Eure department
