= Calvaire de la Rivière-à-Veillet =

Calvary in Mauricie, in Quebec, Canada

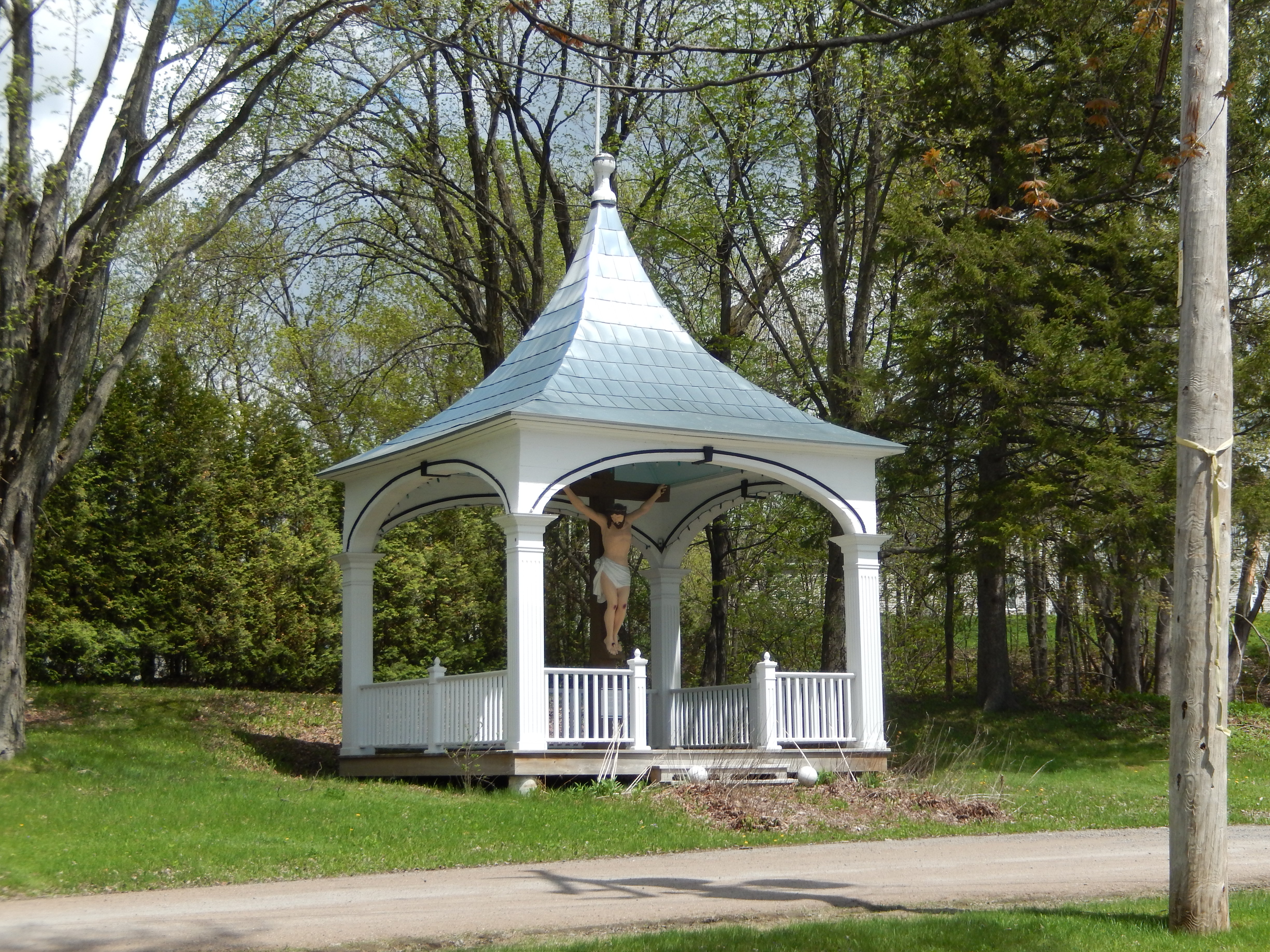
- Calvaire de la Rivière-à-Veillet
- Location: Sainte-Geneviève-de-Batiscan, Les Chenaux Regional County Municipality, Mauricie, Quebec, Canada
- Coordinates: 46.53033°N 72.33928°W
- Designer: François Baillairgé
- Type: Calvary
- Beginning date: 1827
- Restored date: 2006
- Dedicated to: Christ

The Calvaire de la Rivière-à-Veillet (in English: Calvary of Rivière-à-Veillet) is a calvary located behind the church of Sainte-Geneviève-de-Batiscan, in Les Chenaux Regional County Municipality, in administrative region of Mauricie, in Quebec (Canada). It is located along the "rue du Centre" (corner of "rue de l'Église) which goes around the local church.

This calvary turns out to be the second oldest in Quebec. In 1985, this calvary was taken over by the Sainte-Geneviève-de-Batiscan Historical Society. This calvary has been a place of contemplation at all times. Until the 1960s, this calvary was used as a place of daily prayers during the month of Mary, the month of May.

It is cited as cultural heritage building in 2002 by the municipality of the parish of Sainte-Geneviève-de-Batiscan.

== History ==
The concept of the Calvary of Sainte-Geneviève-de-Batiscan was based on the reproduction of the twelfth station of the path of the Cross in Oka. Following a pilgrimage in Oka, Father F.-X. Côté, former parish priest of Sainte-Geneviève-de-Batiscan, was back with the idea of erecting a cross covered with a wooden canopy on the land of Captain François Germain.

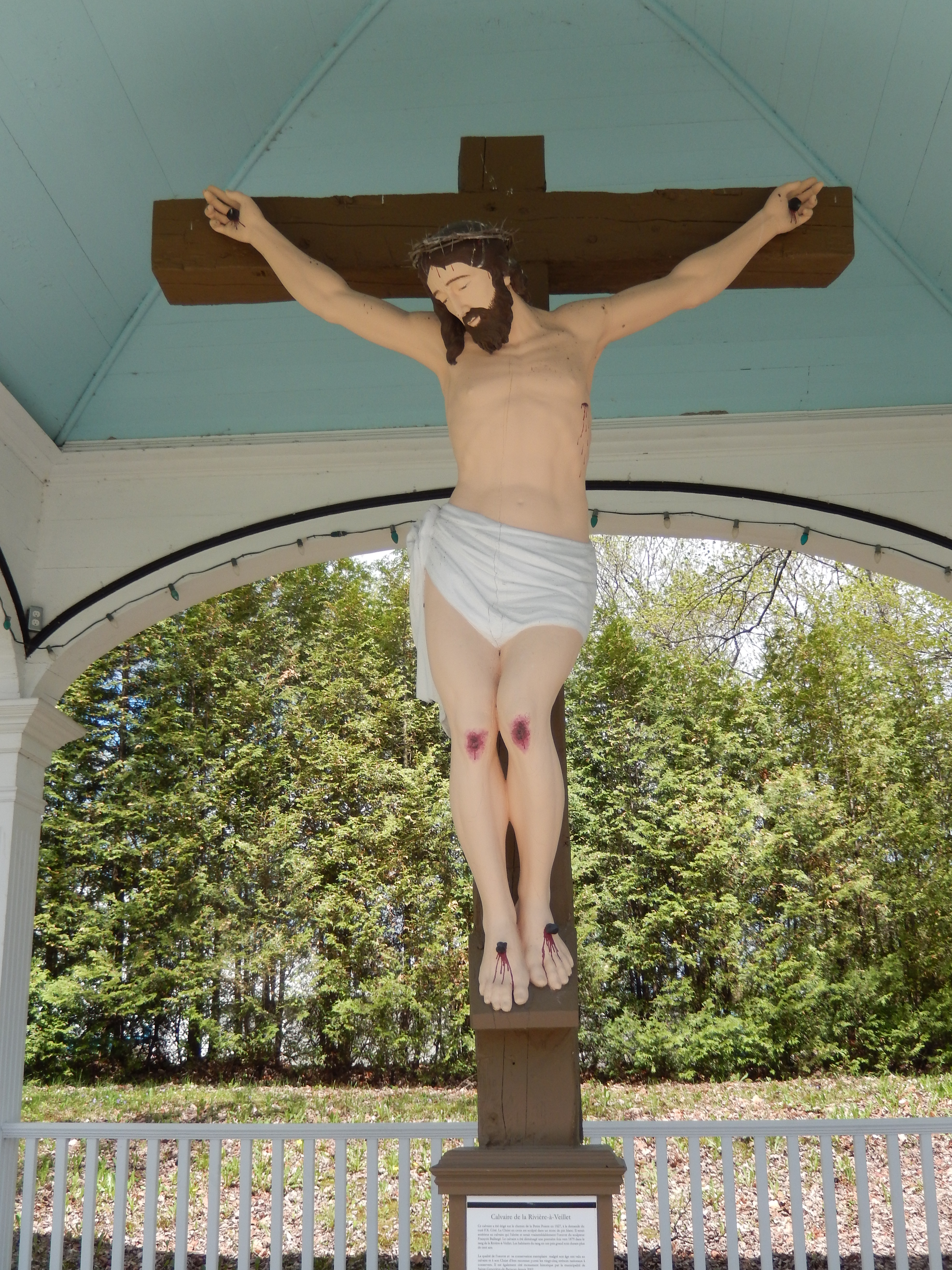
Christ on the cross.

The Calvary was probably built in 1827 as a Stations of the Cross station on a hill in the village of Sainte-Geneviève-de-Bastiscan. The sculpture of Christ on the cross is perhaps older. The author of the sculpture is unknown, although it is sometimes attributed to François Baillairgé (1759-1830). It would be one of the oldest surviving calvaries in Quebec.

Originally, this calvary was part of a set of religious monuments with a way of the cross. In 1846, he moved for the first time from a hill near the church to Rang de la Rivière-à-Veillet. In 2006, after 60 years, it moved back to the village, near its original location. It is cited as cultural heritage building in 2002 by the municipality of the parish of Sainte-Geneviève-de-Batiscan.

During the second half of the 19th century, the Stations of the Cross were dismantled and replaced by another inside the church. The Calvary was offered in 1879 to the inhabitants of Rang de la Rivière-à-Veillet.

On 11 November 2002, the Calvary is cited as cultural heritage building by the municipality of the parish of Sainte-Geneviève-de-Bastiscan. He moved in 2006 to the village, near its original location. It is repaired and restored the same year. Christ on the cross is repainted in its presumed original colors the same year.

== Architecture ==
This calvary consists of an external infrastructure and open on each side, comprising a roof in sheet metal strips, with a wooden ball cap, with curved slopes, supported by four corner posts. A large Christ on the cross is installed in the center of the monument.
