= Institut de la statistique du Québec =

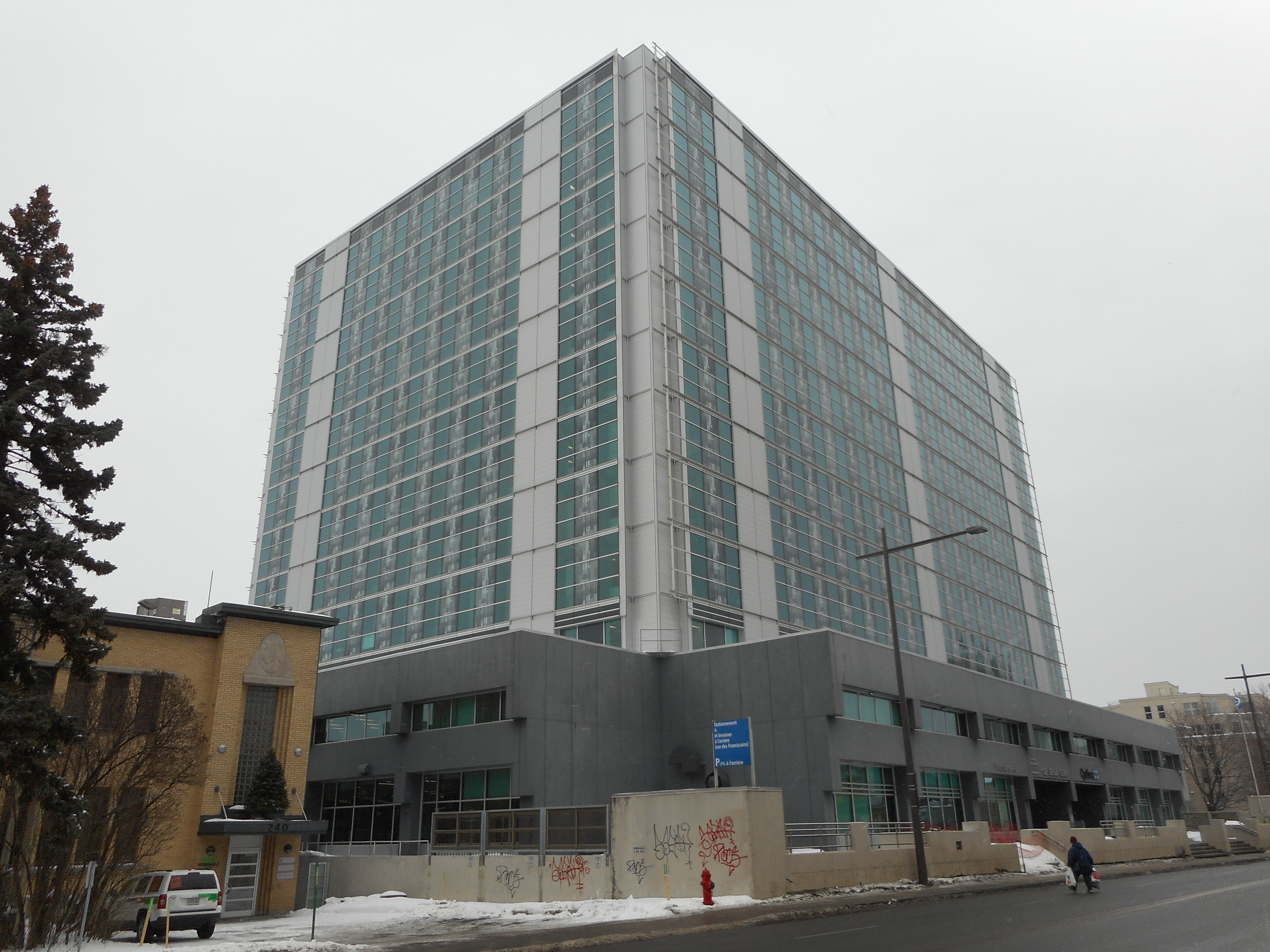
- Headquarters in Quebec City
- Formation: April 1, 1999; 25 years ago
- Type: National statistical service
- Headquarters: 200 chemin Sainte-Foy, Quebec City, Quebec, Canada

The Institut de la statistique du Québec (French pronunciation: [ɛ̃stity də la statistik dy kebɛk], Quebec Statistical Institute) is the governmental statistics agency of the Canadian province of Quebec. It is responsible for producing, analyzing, and publishing official statistics to enhance knowledge, discussion and decision-making. The 1998 law that established it (with effect on April 1, 1999) states that it can also be referred to as Statistique Québec.

It is part of the Ministry of Finance of Quebec.

It grouped together four previous entities: the Bureau de la statistique du Québec, the Institut de recherche et d'information sur la rémunération, Santé Québec, and the personnel of the Ministry of Labour who were responsible for compiling salary information.

== See also ==
- Sub-national autonomous statistical services
- United Nations Statistics Division
