= The Canadian Journal of Statistics =

- Discipline: Statistics
- Language: English
- Edited by: Alexandra M. Schmidt

Publication details
- History: 1973–present
- Publisher: John Wiley & Sons
- Frequency: Quarterly
- Impact factor: 1.0 (2025)

Standard abbreviations
- ISO 4: Can. J. Stat.
- MathSciNet: Canad. J. Statist.

Indexing
- ISSN: 0319-5724
- LCCN: 2017206136
- OCLC no.: 01880906

Links
- Journal homepage; Online access; Online archive

The Canadian Journal of Statistics / La Revue Canadienne de Statistique is the official journal of the Statistical Society of Canada. Established in 1973, the journal is published quarterly by John Wiley & Sons. The inaugural editor-in-chief of the journal is Narayan C. Giri, Alexandra M. Schmidt is the current one.
