= Statistical Society of Canada =

Canadian professional organization of statisticians

- Abbreviation: SSC
- Formation: 18 May 1972
- Type: Organizations based in Canada
- Legal status: active
- Purpose: advocate and public voice, educator and network to promote the use and development of statistics and probability.
- Headquarters: Ottawa, Ontario, Canada
- Region served: Canada
- Official language: English, French
- Formerly called: Statistical Science Association of Canada (1972–77)

The Statistical Society of Canada (abbreviated as SSC; French: Société statistique du Canada) is a professional organization and learned society whose mission is to promote the use and development of statistics and probability.

Its objectives are

- to make the general public aware of the value of statistical thought, the importance of this science and the contribution of statisticians to Canadian society;
- to ensure that decisions that could have a major impact on Canadian society are based on relevant data, interpreted properly using statistics;
- to promote the pursuit of excellence in training and statistical practice in Canada;
- to encourage improvements in statistical methodology;
- to maintain a sense of belonging within the profession, and to promote dialogue among theoreticians and practitioners of statistics.

Each year the SSC awards the CRM-SSC Prize, in collaboration with the Centre de Recherches Mathématiques, to an exceptional young Canadian statistician.

== Publisher of ==
- The Canadian Journal of Statistics

== Leadership ==
- 1972–1974 Norm Shklov
- 1974–1975 Pierre Robillard
- 1975–1976 Charles S. Carter
- 1976–1978 David F. Bray
- 1979 Donald G. Watts
- 1980 Urs R. Maag
- 1981 Ivan P. Fellegi
- 1982 Charles Dunnett
- 1983 Michael A. Stephens
- 1984 James G. Kalbfleisch
- 1985 David F. Andrews
- 1986–1987 Martin B. Wilk
- 1987–1988 James V. Zidek
- 1988–1989 Robert Cléroux
- 1989–1990 Geoffrey J.C. Hole
- 1990–1991 Peter D.M. Macdonald
- 1991–1992 Agnes M. Herzberg
- 1992–1993 Christopher A. Field
- 1993–1994 Jerald F. Lawless
- 1994–1995 R. James Tomkins
- 1995–1996 Marc Moore
- 1996–1997 Richard A. Lockhart
- 1997–1998 Jane F. Gentleman
- 1998–1999 David R. Bellhouse
- 1999–2000 John D. (Jack) Kalbfleisch
- 2000–2001 Louis-Paul Rivest
- 2001–2002 David R. Brillinger
- 2002–2003 James O. Ramsay
- 2003–2004 Mary E. Thompson
- 2004–2005 Nancy M. Reid
- 2005–2006 David A. Binder
- 2006–2007 Charmaine Dean
- 2007–2008 Christian Genest
- 2008–2009 Román Viveros-Aguilera
- 2009–2010 Bovas Abraham
- 2010–2011 Donald L. McLeish
- 2011–2012 John F. Brewster
- 2012–2013 Christian Léger
- 2013–2014 Michael J. Evans
- 2014–2015 A. John Petkau
- 2015–2016 O. Brian Allen
- 2016–2017 Jack Gambino
- 2017–2018 Hugh Chipman
- 2018–2019 Robert Platt
- 2019–2020 Bruce Smith
- 2020–2021 Wendy Lou
- 2021–2022 Grace Yi
- 2022–2023 Bruno Rémillard
- 2023-2024 Shirley Mills
- 2024-2025 Erica Moodie
- 2025-2026 Rob Deardon
- 2026-2027 Rhonda Rosychuk
