= Air pollution =

Presence of dangerous substances in the air

Air pollution is the presence of substances in the air that are harmful to humans, other living beings or the environment. Pollutants can be gases, like ozone or nitrogen oxides, or small particles like soot and dust. Both outdoor and indoor air can be polluted.

Outdoor air pollution comes from burning fossil fuels for electricity and transport, wildfires, some industrial processes, waste management, demolition and agriculture. Indoor air pollution is often from burning firewood or agricultural waste for cooking and heating. Other sources of air pollution include dust storms and volcanic eruptions. Many sources of local air pollution, especially burning fossil fuels, also release greenhouse gases that cause global warming. However, air pollution may limit warming locally.

Air pollution kills 7 to 8 million people each year. It is a significant risk factor for a number of diseases, including stroke, heart disease, chronic obstructive pulmonary disease (COPD), asthma, coronavirus and lung cancer. Particulate matter is the most deadly, both for indoor and outdoor air pollution. Ozone affects crops, and forests are damaged by the pollution that causes acid rain. Overall, the World Bank has estimated that welfare losses (premature deaths) and productivity losses (lost labor) caused by air pollution cost the world economy over $8 trillion per year.

Various technologies and strategies reduce air pollution. Key approaches include clean cookers, fire protection, improved waste management, dust control, industrial scrubbers, electric vehicles and renewable energy. National air quality laws have often been effective, notably the 1956 Clean Air Act in Britain and the 1963 US Clean Air Act. International efforts have had mixed results: the Montreal Protocol almost eliminated harmful ozone-depleting chemicals, while international action on climate change has been less successful.

== Sources ==
=== Human sources ===
==== Industry and construction ====
Demolition of the cooling towers of a power station, Athlone, Cape Town, South Africa, 2010.

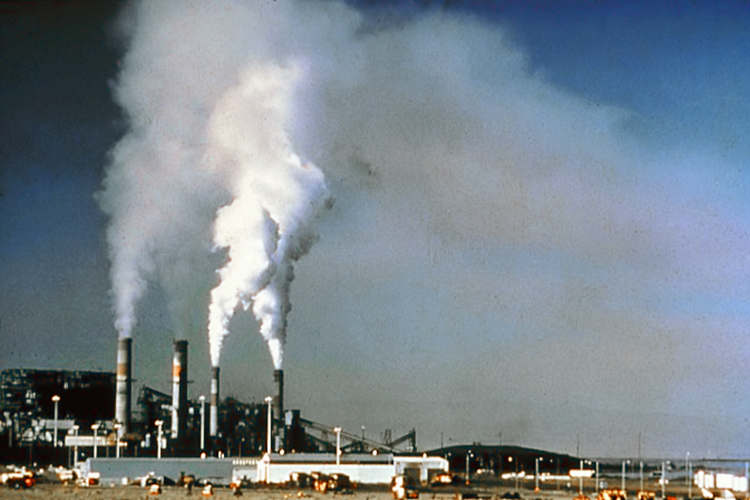
Before flue-gas desulfurization was installed, the emissions from this power plant in New Mexico contained excessive amounts of sulfur dioxide.

Burning fuel to generate electricity causes air pollution; lignite and coal produce the most air pollution, followed by oil, and then by fossil gas and biomass. Methane leaks are common in oil and gas production, and oil refineries emit a wide range of pollutants. Some hazardous air pollutants are produced in plastic and rubber production, whereas chloroform can be produced during water chlorination, and arsenic is found in the mining industry. Many polluting industries have been pushed out of richer nations, and China too has started to push its most polluting industries out of the country.

Construction and demolition produces dust, but also other pollutants. The direct particles from construction and demolition are relatively coarse. Construction also has an indirect impact on air quality, as cement production is one of the main sources of particle pollution. Though banned in many countries, asbestos persists in older buildings, where it poses a risk of lung disease when disturbed. Building materials including carpeting and plywood emit formaldehyde, a gas which can cause difficulty breathing and nausea.

==== Transportation ====
Road vehicles produce a significant amount of all air pollution. For instance, they may be responsible for a third to half of all nitrogen dioxide emissions, and are a major cause of climate change. Vehicles with petrol and diesel engines produce about half of their emissions from their exhaust gas, and the other half from non-exhaust emissions (tire and brake wear and erosion or disturbance of the road surface); electric vehicles produce no tailpipe emissions, but still produce the other emissions. Diesel trains, ships, and planes also cause air pollution.

==== Agriculture and waste ====
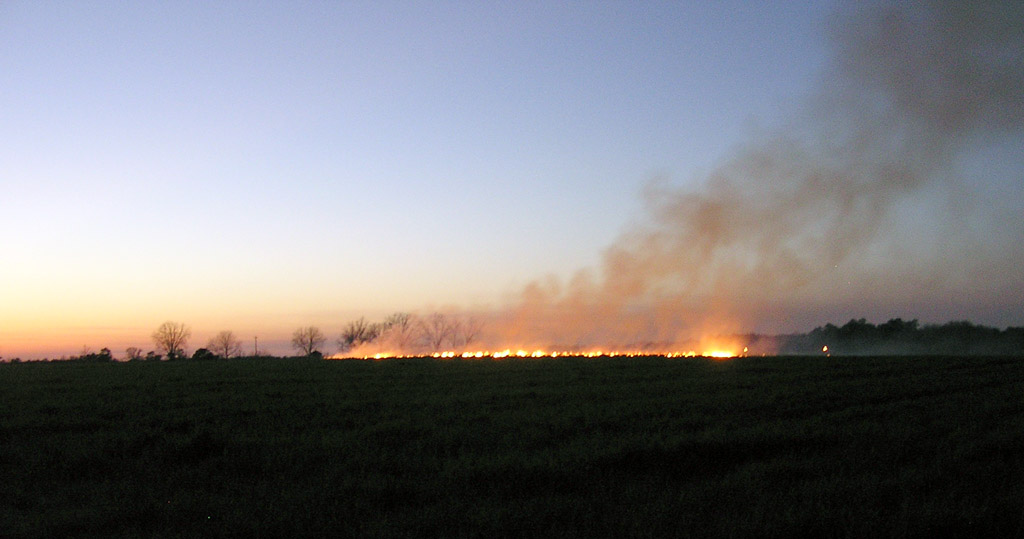
Controlled burning of a field outside of Statesboro, Georgia, US, in preparation for spring planting.

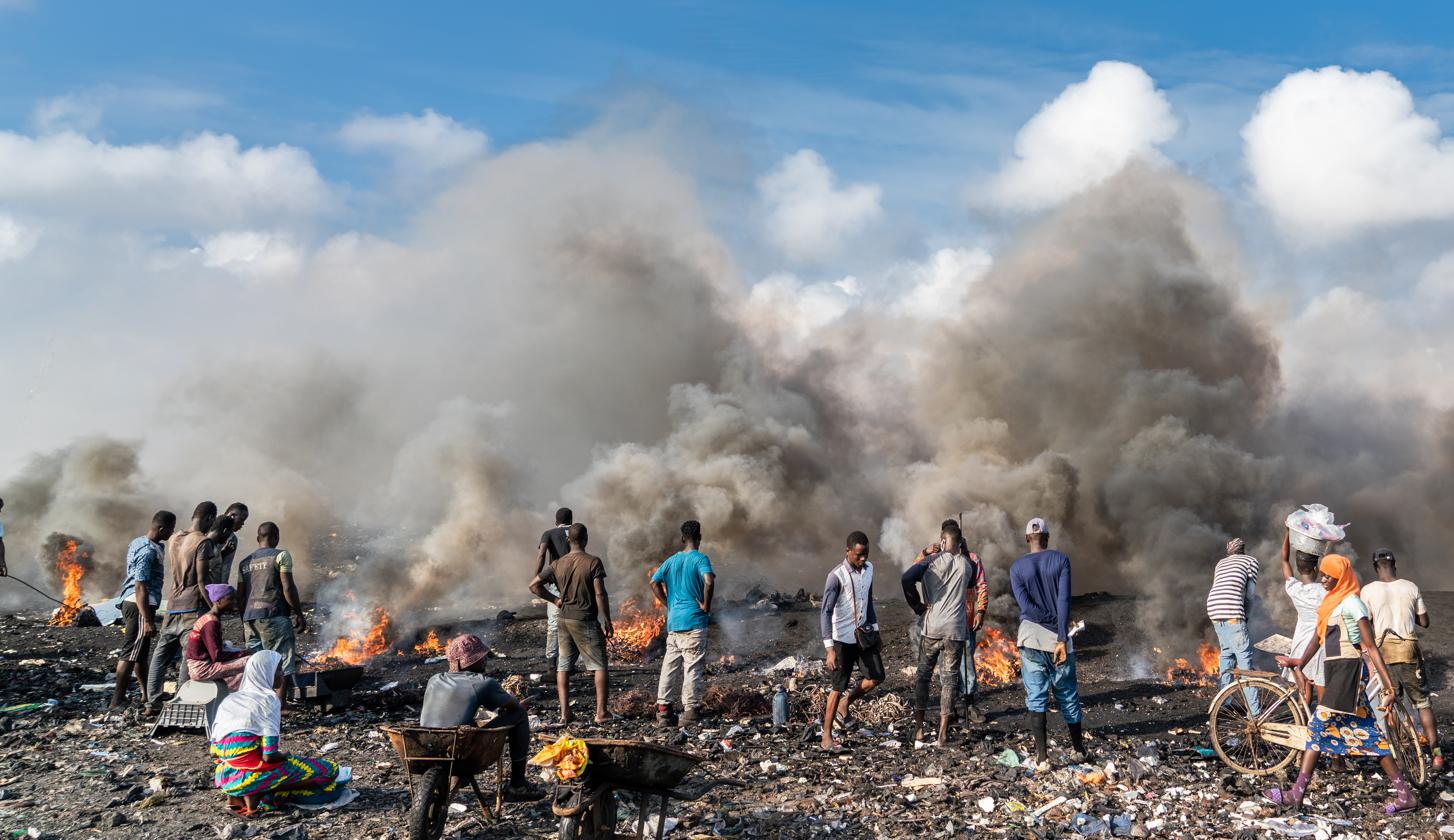
E-waste processing in Agbogbloshie, Ghana, using open-burning of electronics to access valuable metals like copper.

Agricultural emissions, both from crops and from animal agriculture, contribute substantially to air pollution. For instance, methane is emitted by the digestion of food by cattle, causing ground-level ozone. Agriculture is also a major source of ammonia, which can form fine particulate matter. Practices like slash-and-burn in forests like the Amazon cause large air pollution alongside deforestation.

Open dumps of waste are a common source of air pollution in low-income countries. They can be a source of toxins and can promote the growth of microbes that pollute water and air. Through open burning of waste—whether self-ignited or burned on purpose—soot, methane, and other pollutants are released. Organic waste in landfills itself also produces methane as it decomposes. Globally, a quarter of solid waste is not collected and another quarter is not disposed of properly.

==== Household sources ====
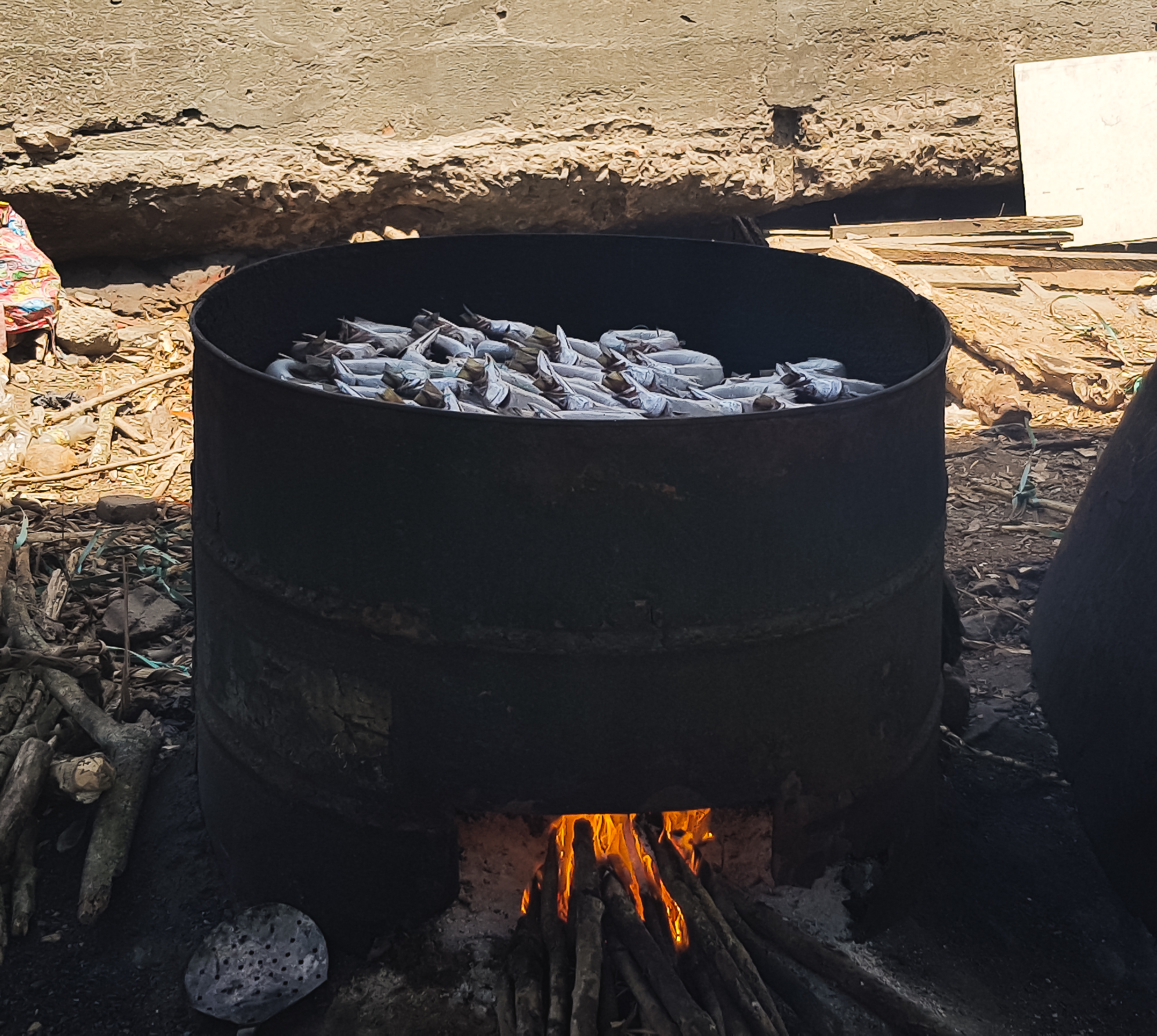
Smoking fish over an open fire in Ghana, 2018.

As of 2023, more than 2.3 billion people in developing countries rely on burning polluting fuels such as firewood, agricultural waste, dry dung, coal, or charcoal for cooking, which causes harmful household air pollution. Kerosene, another polluting fuel, is used in many countries for lighting and sometimes for space heating or cooking. Globally, 12% of outdoor fine particle pollution comes from household cooking. Health effects are concentrated among women, who are likely to be responsible for cooking, and young children.

Gas stoves for cooking contribute to indoor air pollution by emitting NO_{2}, benzene, and carbon monoxide. Toasters can produce particulate pollution. Similarly, heating systems such as furnaces and other types of fuel-burning heating devices release pollutants into the air. In some developed countries, including the UK and Sydney, Australia, wood stoves are the major source of particulate pollution in urban areas. Wood stoves can also emit carbon monoxide and NO_{x}.

Other sources of indoor air pollution are building materials, biological material and tobacco smoke. Biological material, such as dander, house dust mite, mold and pollen, can come from humans, animals or plants. Some of this material can trigger allergies, such as allergic rhinitis. Fumes from pesticides, paints, cleaning products and personal care products can be substantial, and make up an increasing share of outdoor and indoor air pollution as transportation is getting cleaner.

=== Natural sources ===
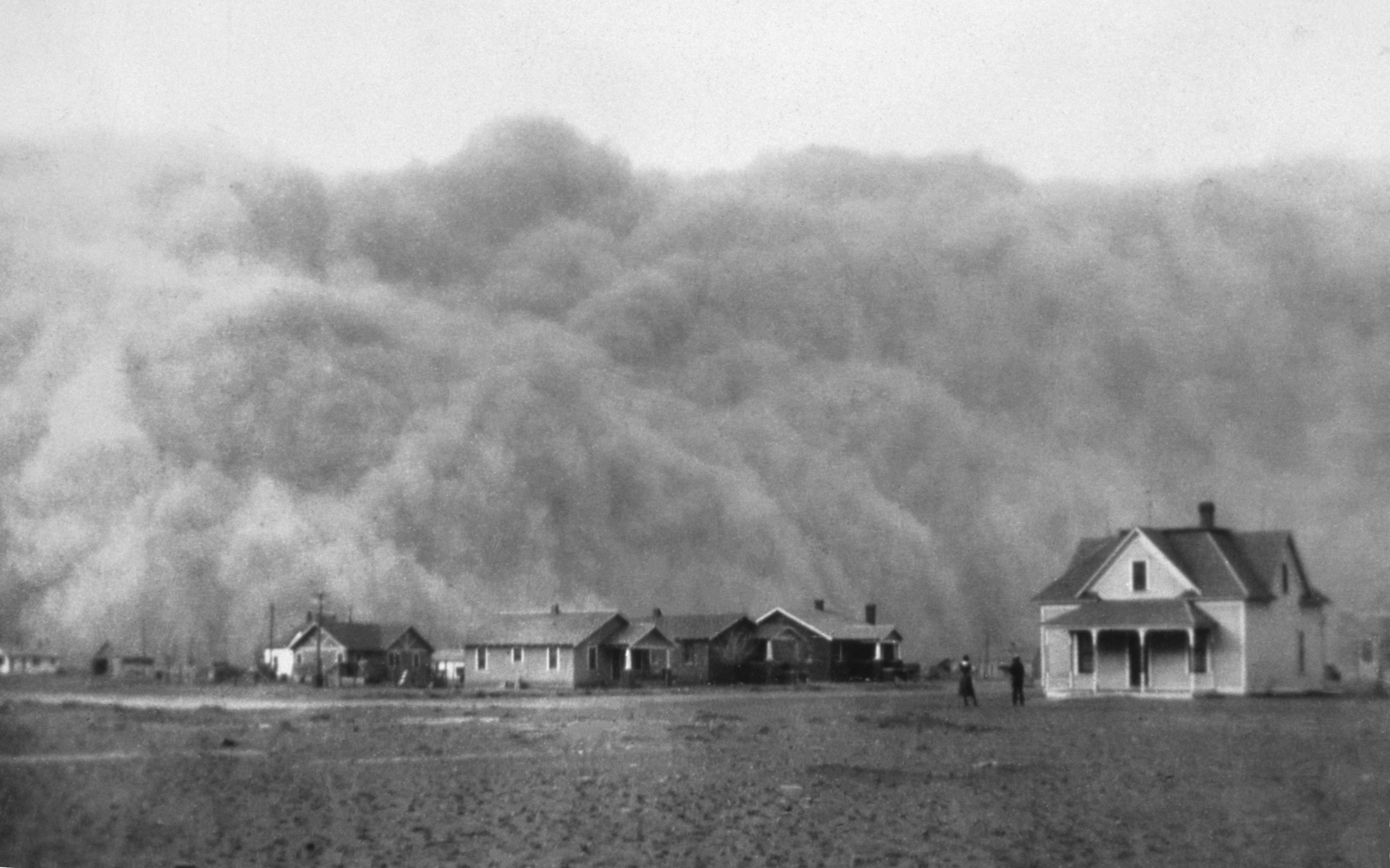
Dust storm approaching Stratford, Texas, in 1935.

Dust from desert can cause poor air quality far from its source. For instance, dust from the Gobi Desert in China and Mongolia can reach Hawaii, and dust from the Sahara reaches the Amazon rainforest in South America.

Radon is a radioactive gas that can build up in buildings from the soil. It can cause lung cancer, especially in smokers. Levels are generally low, but can be elevated in buildings with "leaky" foundations or areas with soils rich in uranium. Volcanic eruptions can be a large source of sulfur dioxide and also produce particle pollution.

Vegetation can emit gases that contribute to ozone formation and particle pollution. This is especially true in warmer climates and during the growth season. These gases react with human pollution sources to produce a seasonal haze. Black gum, poplar, oak and willow emit gases that can raise ozone levels up to eight times more than low-impact tree species. Wildfires, which have become more severe and more common due to climate change, release fine particles. They are a major source of air pollution.

== Major pollutants ==
Major pollutants, their sources and effects: (1) greenhouse gases, (2) particulate pollution, (3) ozone-depleting gases, (4) acid rain, (5) ground-level ozone, (6) nitrogen oxides

Air pollutants can be tiny solid or liquid particles dispersed in the air (called aerosols), or gases. Pollutants are classified as primary or secondary. Primary pollutants are produced directly by a source and remain in the same chemical form after they have been emitted into the atmosphere. Examples include carbon monoxide gas from car exhausts and sulfur dioxide from factories. Secondary pollutants are not emitted directly. Rather, they form in the air when primary pollutants react with each other or with other parts of the atmosphere. Ground-level ozone is one example of a secondary pollutant. Some pollutants may be both primary and secondary — both are emitted directly and formed from other primary pollutants.

=== Ammonia ===
Ammonia (NH_{3}) is emitted mainly by overuse of synthetic nitrogen fertilizers on farmland, and from manure and urine from livestock. At typical concentrations in the air, it is not harmful to health directly. However, ammonia can react with other pollutants in the air to form ammonium sulfate or nitrate salts, contributing to particulate matter pollution. Furthermore, when ammonia is deposited onto the soil, it can harm ecosystems via eutrophication.

=== Carbon dioxide ===
Carbon dioxide (CO_{2}) is mainly emitted by the burning of fossil fuels. CO_{2} is sometimes called an air pollutant, because it is the main greenhouse gas responsible for climate change. Although the World Health Organization recognizes CO_{2} as a climate pollutant, it does not include the gas in its Air Quality Guidelines or set recommended targets for it. This question of terminology has practical consequences, for example, in determining whether the U.S. Clean Air Act (which is designed to improve air quality) is deemed to regulate CO_{2} emissions. The Inflation Reduction Act of 2022 amended the Clean Air Act to define CO_{2} from fossil fuel burning explicitly as an air pollutant.

=== Carbon monoxide ===
Carbon monoxide (CO) is a colorless, odorless, and toxic gas. It is a product of combustion of fuel such as natural gas, coal, or wood. In the past, emissions from vehicles were the main source of CO, but modern vehicles do not emit much of it. Now, wildfires and bonfires are the main source of outdoors CO. Indoors, CO is a larger problem and mainly comes from cooking and heating. In poorly ventilated spaces, CO can accumulate to dangerous levels, and exposure may cause people to lose consciousness and die. When CO is destroyed in the atmosphere, it can raise levels of CO_{2} and CH_{4}.

=== Ground-level ozone ===
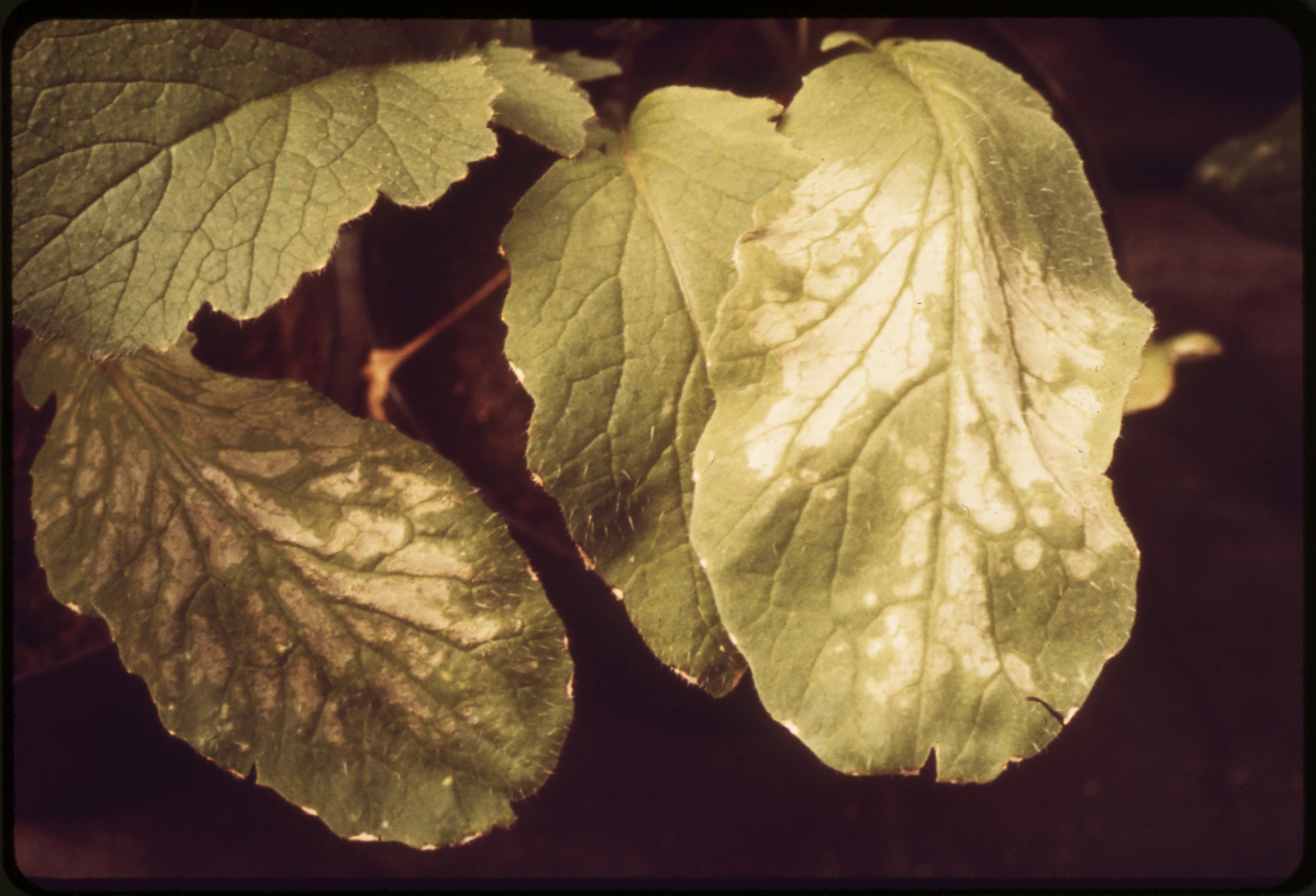
Leaves damaged by exposure to ozone.

Ground-level ozone (O_{3}) is mostly created when NO_{x} and volatile organic compounds mix in the presence of sunlight. It can also form from carbon monoxide or methane. Due to the influence of temperature and sunlight on this reaction, high ozone levels are most common on hot summer afternoons. It is the main gas in photochemical smog.

O_{3} can be harmful to human health, but also to some materials, forests, plants, and crops. Smog is a particular problem in big cities where it cannot easily be transported away by wind (e.g. cities built in valleys surrounded by mountains). When ground-level ozone is produced, it can linger in the air for days or weeks, and therefore be transported far from where it was first formed.

=== Nitrogen oxides ===
A NASA video on satellite measurement of nitrogen oxides, showing declining levels due to regulation. However, some regions did see rising levels of NO_{2} pollution, for instance, those with fracking or civil unrest.

Nitrogen oxides (NO_{x}), particularly nitric oxide (NO), are mostly created by the burning of fossil fuels, and in lesser amounts by lightning. Nitrogen dioxide (NO_{2}) is formed from NO in a reaction with other atmospheric gases. NO and NO_{2} can form acid rain, can form into a haze, and can cause nutrient pollution in water. NO_{2} is a reddish-brown toxic gas with a strong odor, whereas NO is odorless and colorless.

=== Particulate matter ===
Particulate matter (PM), also known as particle pollution, includes all airborne substances that are not gases. It is a mix of microscopic solid particles or droplets suspended in a gas.

Particulate matter can contain a large variety of materials and chemical compounds including toxic substances, which can vary strongly in size. Coarse PM (PM_{10}) is 10 micrometer (μm) or smaller in diameter, fine PM (PM_{2.5}) is smaller than 2.5 μm, and ultrafine particles are 0.1 μm or smaller. Smaller particles pose more risk to health, as they can reach the bloodstream. A definitive link between fine particulate pollution and higher death rates in urban areas was established by the Harvard Six Cities study, published in 1993.

Sea spray, wildfires, volcanoes and dust storms are the main natural sources of PM. Meanwhile, human sources include the burning of biomass and fossil fuels, as well as road emissions and dust resuspension. Human PM is usually finer than natural PM. Most particulate matter is formed in the atmosphere from precursor gases. For instance, sulfate comes from SO_{2}, nitrate from NO_{2}, and ammonium is formed from ammonia. Soot on the other hand is directly emitted from combustion, and consists of black carbon and organic compounds. Particulate matter can have a cooling effect locally on the climate, as it reflects sunlight away from Earth's surface.

=== Sulfur dioxide ===
Sulfur dioxide (SO_{2}), an acidic and corrosive gas, is produced mostly by burning crude oil and coal. These fossil fuels often contain sulfur compounds, and their combustion generates sulfur dioxide. In Europe and North America, SO_{2} is mostly found in areas with significant shipping and industry, as road traffic fuels are regulated. Smaller amounts of SO_{2} are released from smelting and volcanoes.

High concentrations of SO_{2} in the air generally also lead to the formation of other sulfur oxides (SO_{x}). SO_{x} can react with other compounds in the atmosphere to form small particles and contribute to particulate matter pollution. At high concentrations, gaseous SO_{x} can harm plants by damaging leafs and decreasing growth. Further oxidation of SO_{2}, mostly taking place in cloud droplets, forms sulfuric acid (H_{2}SO_{4}), which is one of the components of acid rain.

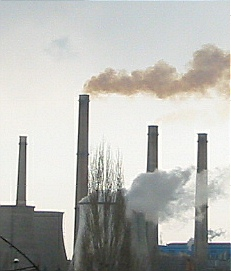
Smog polluting the air.

=== Volatile organic compounds ===
Volatile organic compounds (VOCs) are a class of carbon-based chemicals that exist as gases at room temperature, found both indoors and outdoors. They can cause photochemical smog and form aerosols impacting climate. The group includes methane, acetone, and toluene. Some can cause cancer, such as butadiene and benzene, with benzene being released from cigarette smoking. Methane is a greenhouse gas and the second-largest driver of global warming. Other VOCs contribute to climate warming because they help form ground-level ozone, a greenhouse gas.

=== Other pollutants ===
Some heavy metals can be bad for health. For instance, lead exposure can lead to learning disabilities in children. In the atmosphere, heavy metals can exist in different states, such as particles or gases. One of the forms of chromium can cause cancer. Mercury is harmful both as an element and in an organic compound. In the atmosphere, it comes mostly from cement production, coal burning, and incinerators.

Persistent organic pollutants (POPs) are organic compounds that are resistant to environmental degradation. They persist in the environment, are capable of long-range transmission, bioaccumulate in humans and animals, and biomagnify in food chains. The Stockholm Convention on Persistent Organic Pollutants identified pesticides and other POPs of concern. These include dioxins and furans which are created by waste combustion. POPs are usually either semi-volatile (gaseous only at higher temperatures) or non-volatile (emitted as particles). The harmful effects of the pesticide DDT, a POP, were popularized by Rachel Carson's 1962 book Silent Spring. PFASs and polycyclic aromatic hydrocarbons (PAHs) are other examples of POPs.

Chlorofluorocarbons (CFCs) are a group of compounds which harm the ozone layer. They were widely used in aerosol sprays, refrigerants, and fire suppression. Due to their chemical stability, CFCs persist in the atmosphere and eventually reach the stratosphere (the upper atmosphere). There, they break down under the impact of UV light, which releases chlorine. This in turn reacts with ozone, destroying it. As the ozone layer blocks harmful UV radiation from reaching the Earth's surface, its depletion leads to health risks such as skin ageing and skin cancer.

== Exposure ==
PM_{2.5} Levels Across the World's 5 Most Populated Nations in 2019.

Exposure to air pollution varies widely across the world and across groups. Children, for example, are more exposed because they breathe more rapidly than adults and closer to the ground, where pollution from vehicle exhaust and dust is more concentrated. Similarly, people engaging in strenuous exercise inhale more pollutants than those at rest. People can reduce their exposure by wearing high-quality face masks or by using air purifiers.

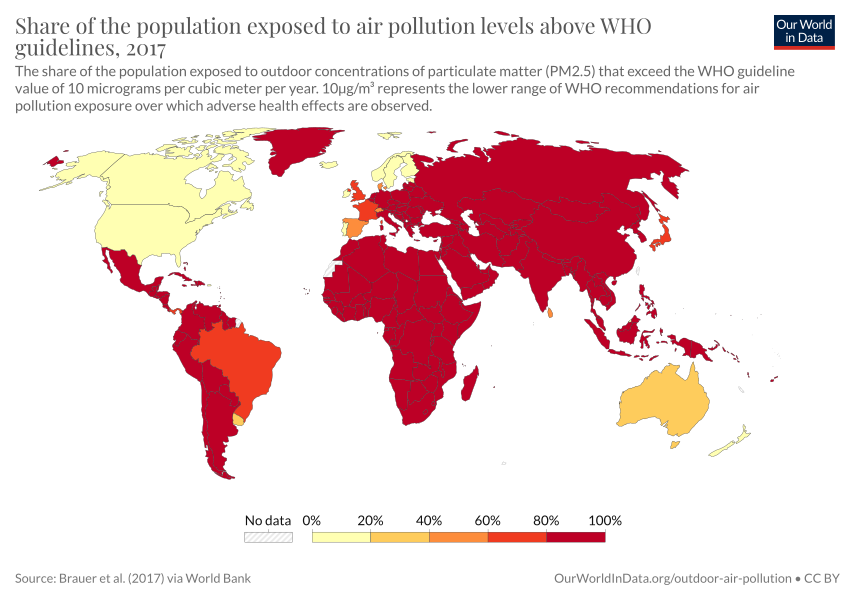
Share of the population exposed to air pollution levels above WHO guidelines, 2017.

For some pollutants, low exposure can be seen as safe, whereas other pollutants have negative health effects even at low levels. As evidence has grown that even very low levels of air pollutants hurt human health, the WHO halved its recommended safe limit for particulate matter from 10 μg/m^{3} to 5 μg/m^{3} in 2021. Under the new guideline, nearly the entire global population—97%—is classified as exposed to unsafe levels of fine particles (PM_{2.5)}. The new limit for nitrogen dioxide (NO_{2}) became 75% lower. For all pollutants together, the World Health Organization concluded that 99% of the world population is exposed to harmful air pollution.

For some pollutants such as black carbon, traffic related exposures may dominate total exposure despite short exposure times, since high concentrations coincide with proximity to major roads or participation in (motorized) traffic. A large portion of total daily exposure occurs as short peaks of high concentrations.

=== By socioeconomic group ===
While air pollution affects a variety of populations, some groups are more exposed. In many regions, there are disparities in exposure to pollution by race and income. This is especially true in countries with high inequalities in incomes and healthcare, such as the United States. Polluting industries and roads are more likely to be placed in poorer communities, and people in these communities are more likely to work outdoors, leading to additional exposure. Residents in public housing, who are generally low-income and cannot easily move to healthier neighborhoods, are highly affected by nearby refineries and chemical plants. Additionally, lower-income communities more often perform polluting activities, such as using solid biofuels for cooking. In the United States, Blacks and Latinos generally face more pollution than Whites and Asians.

=== By geographic area ===
Top 5 most polluted cities in 2024
City	PM_{2.5} concentration
Byrnihat, India	128
Delhi, India	108
Karaganda, Kazakhstan	105
Mullanpur, India	102
Lahore, Pakistan	102

Exposure to outdoor air pollution is worst in lower-middle income countries in line with the environmental Kuznets curve, which postulates that pollution is worst in economies that rely on manufacturing but have not yet been able to prioritize environmental regulation. Indoor air pollution is worst in low-income countries, in particularly south-east Asia, the western Pacific, and Africa.

Outdoor air pollution is usually concentrated in densely populated metropolitan areas. Urbanization leads to a rapid rise in premature mortality due to air pollution in fast-growing tropical cities. Indoor air pollution on the other hand is most common in rural areas, which may lack access to clean cooking fuels.

A map published in 2025 by Climate TRACE indicates that PM_{2.5} (fine particles) and other toxins are released near the homes of about 1.6 billion people, about 900 million of whom are in the path of "super-emitting" facilities such as power plants, refineries, ports, and mines.

== Health effects ==
Outdoor air pollution death rate

Death rate from indoor air pollution

Air pollution is an important risk factor for various diseases, such as COPD (a common lung disease), stroke, heart disease, lung cancer, and pneumonia. Indoor air pollution is also associated with cataract. According to the WHO, 99% of the world's population lives in areas with air pollution that exceeds WHO recommended levels. Even at very low levels (under the World Health Organization recommended levels), fine particulates can continue to cause harm.

Pollutants strongly linked to ill health include particulate matter, carbon monoxide, nitrogen dioxide (NO_{2}), ozone (O_{3}), and sulfur dioxide (SO_{2}). Fine particulates are especially damaging, as they can enter the bloodstream via the lungs and reach other organs. Air pollution causes disease by driving inflammation and oxidative stress, suppressing the immune system, and by damaging DNA.

People living in poverty, babies, and older people are disproportionately affected by air pollution; pregnancy is also more risky when exposed to air pollution. Communities with a low socioeconomic status and minority groups are more vulnerable to pollution than more privileged communities. Lower-income groups might for instance have less access to healthcare.

=== Mortality ===
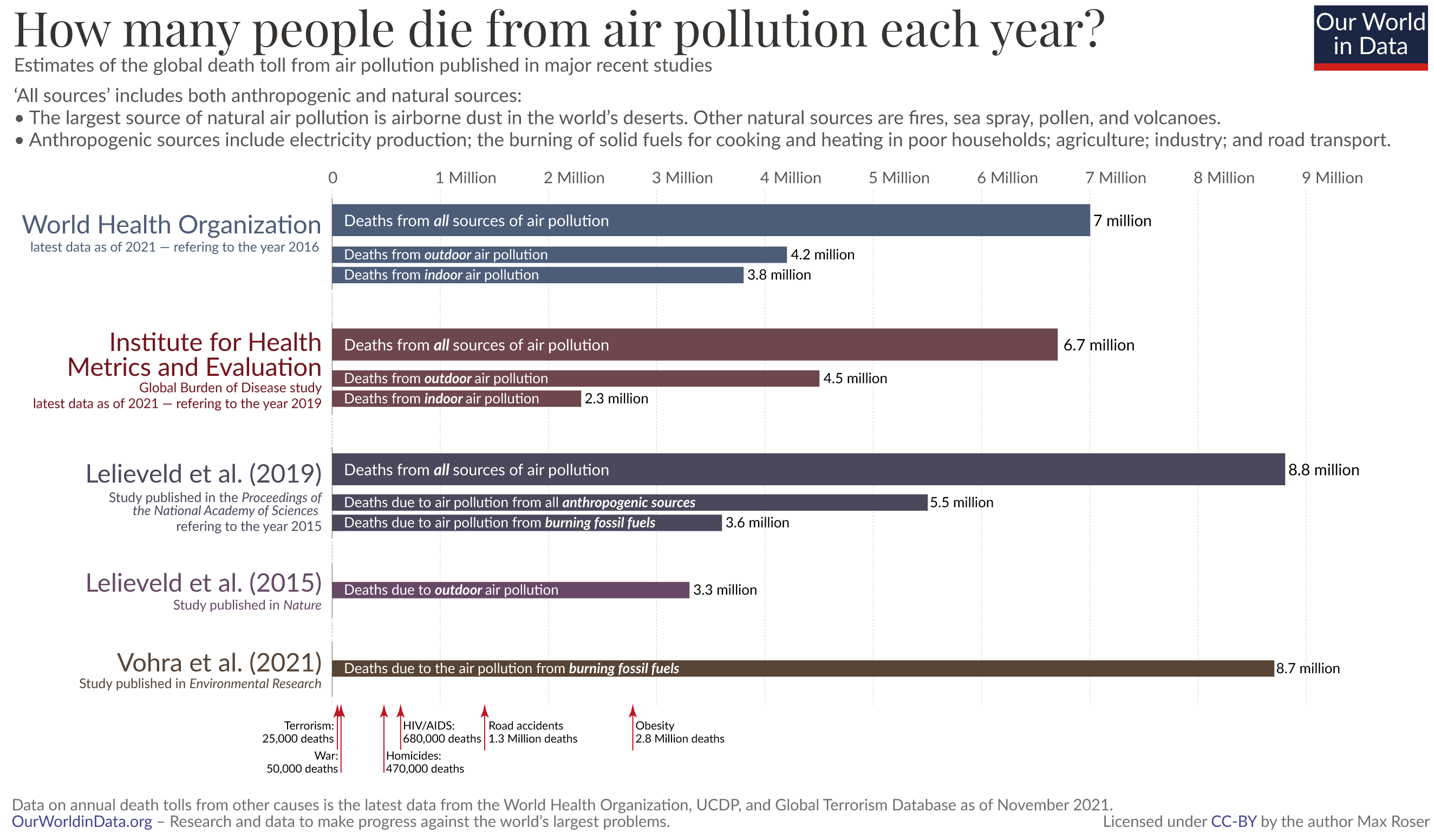
Estimates of yearly deaths from air pollution range from 6.7 million to 8.8 million. In comparison, war caused 50,000 yearly deaths and terrorism 25,000.

Deaths in 2021 from air pollution per 100,000 inhabitants (IHME).

Estimates of deaths due to air pollution vary. The 2024 Global Burden of Disease Study estimates that air pollution contributed to 8.1 million deaths in 2021, which is more than 1 in 8 deaths. Outdoor particulate pollution (PM_{2.5}) was the largest cause of death (4.7 million), followed by indoor particulate pollution (3.1 million) and ozone (0.5 million).

The World Health Organization estimates that 6.7 million people die from air pollution each year, 4.2 million due to outdoor air pollution. Roughly 68% of outdoor air pollution-related premature deaths were due to coronary heart disease and stroke, 14% due to COPD, and 14% due to lung infections (lower respiratory tract infections).

A study published in 2019 estimated that, for 2015, the number was about 8.8 million, with 5.5 million of these premature deaths due to air pollution from human sources. The global mean loss of life expectancy from air pollution in 2015 was 2.9 years, substantially more than, for example, 0.3 years from all forms of direct violence.

==== By region ====
Regional deaths due to air pollution depend not only on the regional exposure, but also on how large and how old the population is, and the health of people overall.

In some countries, more than 20% of deaths are attributed to air pollution (e.g. China, Nepal, Bangladesh, Laos, and North Korea). In South America, about 4% of deaths are from air pollution, while in countries such as Australia, Canada, and the US, this number is under 3%.

In absolute number, India and China have the higher number of deaths from air pollution. In India, it contributed to 2.1 million deaths in 2021, whereas China saw 2.4 million deaths. Annual premature European deaths from air pollution are estimated at 416,000 to 800,000. The UK saw some 17,000 deaths in 2021 due to air pollution and the US saw 64,000. Nigeria, Indonesia and Pakistan each saw over 200,000 deaths resulting from air pollution.

==== By source ====
Deaths caused by accidents and air pollution from fossil fuel use in power plants exceed those caused by production of renewable energy.

Though the rate of exposure to ground-level ozone ("smog") and small-particulate matter ("soot") has been declining, in 2026, nearly half of people in the US under age 18 live in an area receiving a failing grade for at least one measure of air pollution.

The burning of fossil fuels is the largest source of air pollution deaths. There are estimated 4.5 million annual premature deaths worldwide due to pollutants released by high-emission power stations and vehicle exhausts. PM_{2.5} formed from emissions from coal-fired power plants could be more harmful than other types of fine particulate matter.

The World Health Organization (WHO) estimates that cooking-related pollution causes 3.8 million annual deaths. The Global Burden of Disease study estimated the number of deaths in 2021 at 3.1 million.

=== Cardiovascular disease ===
There is strong evidence that air pollution increases the risk of cardiovascular disease, including stroke, high blood pressure, and coronary heart disease. According to the Global Burden of Disease Study, air pollution is responsible for 27% of deaths from strokes worldwide and 28% of coronary heart disease. The risks are highest in regions with higher air pollution (e.g. Asia), for elderly and for people who are overweight.

Air pollution is a leading risk factor for stroke, particularly in developing countries where pollutant levels are highest. A systematic analysis of 17 different risk factors in 188 countries found air pollution is associated with nearly one in three strokes (29%) worldwide (34% of strokes in developing countries versus 10% in developed countries). The mechanisms linking air pollution to increased cardiovascular mortality are not fully understood, but likely include systemic inflammation and oxidative stress.

=== Lung disease ===
Air pollution is associated with increased development, hospitalization, mortality, and COPD (chronic obstructive pulmonary disease). COPD is a common disease which causes restricted airflow and breathing difficulties, and is the fourth-largest cause of death globally. Nearly half of global COPD deaths are due to air pollution. Fine particles (PM_{2.5}) and NO_{2} are associated with increased risk of developing COPD. In children, air pollution can hinder lung development, which may increase their susceptibility to COPD later in life.

Air pollution is further associated with increased risk of asthma and worsening of symptoms, and this effect seems stronger in children. For adults, fine particles (PM_{2.5}) or NO_{2} seem linked to asthma onset too. Short-term exposure to ozone makes asthma worse in children. There is limited evidence on (almost) fatal asthma attacks in children: ground-level ozone and PM_{2.5} seem to increase its risk.

=== Cancer ===
Share of lung cancer deaths attributed to air pollution

About 265,000 lung cancer deaths were attributed globally in 2019 to exposure to fine particulate matter (PM_{2.5}) suspended in the air. Exposure to indoor air pollution, including radon, caused another 170,000 lung cancer deaths. Lung cancer was also more common among people exposed to NO_{2} and black carbon.

Outdoor air pollution may increase risk of other types of cancer too, but the evidence is not as clear as for lung cancer. For example, there may be a relationship between kidney cancer and PM_{2.5} and NO_{2} levels. Household air pollution – from cooking with solid fuels, but also from radon in building material – has been associated with cervical, oral, and esophageal cancer.

=== Pregnancy and children ===
Stillbirths, miscarriages, and birth defects are all more likely when the mother is exposed to air pollution during pregnancy. Exposure to air pollution also raises the chance that a baby has a low birth weight. The impacts might be due to pollutants directly impacting the placenta or fetus, or indirectly via the mother's health (as air pollution can cause systemic inflammation and oxidative stress).

Over a third of preterm births were associated with air pollution in 2021 globally. It causes more than half a million newborn deaths, a quarter of overall deaths. The source of PM_{2.5} differs greatly by region. In South and East Asia, pregnant women are frequently exposed to indoor air pollution because of wood and other biomass fuels being used for cooking, which are responsible for more than 80% of regional pollution. In the Middle East, North Africa, and West sub-Saharan Africa, fine PM comes from natural sources, such as dust storms.

For data including older children, polluted air resulted in the death of over 700,000 children in 2021 (709,000 under 5 years of age and 16,600 aged 5–14 years). Children in low- or middle-income countries are exposed to higher levels of fine particulate matter than those in high income countries. Further health effects of air pollution on children include asthma, pneumonia, and lower respiratory tract infections. There is possibly a link between exposure to air pollution during pregnancy and after birth and autism in children.

Many of these relationships could previously only be described as correlations, as study designs that demonstrate causation are difficult or impossible to conduct in environmental medicine. This would require a randomized controlled trial. Scientists at BIPS in Bremen were able to demonstrate a causal relationship for at least some health problems (e.g. diabetes and high blood pressure) using a special study design.

=== Brain health ===
Air pollution is linked to various diseases of the brain. It increases the risk of dementia. Indoor air pollution exposure during childhood may negatively affect cognitive function and neurodevelopment. Prenatal exposure may also affect neurodevelopment. Exposure to air pollution may contribute to neurodegenerative diseases such as Parkinson's disease.

Exposure to air pollution may also drive mental health issues, such as depression and anxiety. In particular, air pollution from the use of solid fuels was associated with a higher depression risk. Depression risk and suicide was more strongly linked to finer particulate matter (PM_{2.5}), compared to coarser particles (PM_{10}). The association was strongest for people over the age of 65.

Problems with thinking (cognitive issues) are also associated with air pollution. In people over the age of 40, both NO_{x} and PM_{2.5} have been linked to general cognitive problems. PM_{2.5} was also associated with reduced verbal fluency (for instance, number of animals one can list in a minute) and worse executive functions (like attention and working memory). Similarly, children tended to fare worse in tests involving working memory when there was NO_{x}, PM_{2.5}, or PM_{10} pollution.

=== Physical activity ===
The health benefits of physical exercise may be modulated by air quality. A 2025 cross-national study involving 1.5 million adults demonstrated that high levels of ambient fine particulate matter (PM _{2.5} μg/m^{3}) can significantly diminish the protective effects of leisure-time physical activity against all-cause and cause-specific mortality.

The study identified a critical threshold of 25 μg/m^{3} exposure; below this annual average concentration, regular exercise reduced all-cause mortality by approximately 30%. However, this benefit was halved (to 12–15%) when concentrations exceeded 25 μg/m^{3} exposure.

== Social and environmental impacts ==
=== Acid rain ===
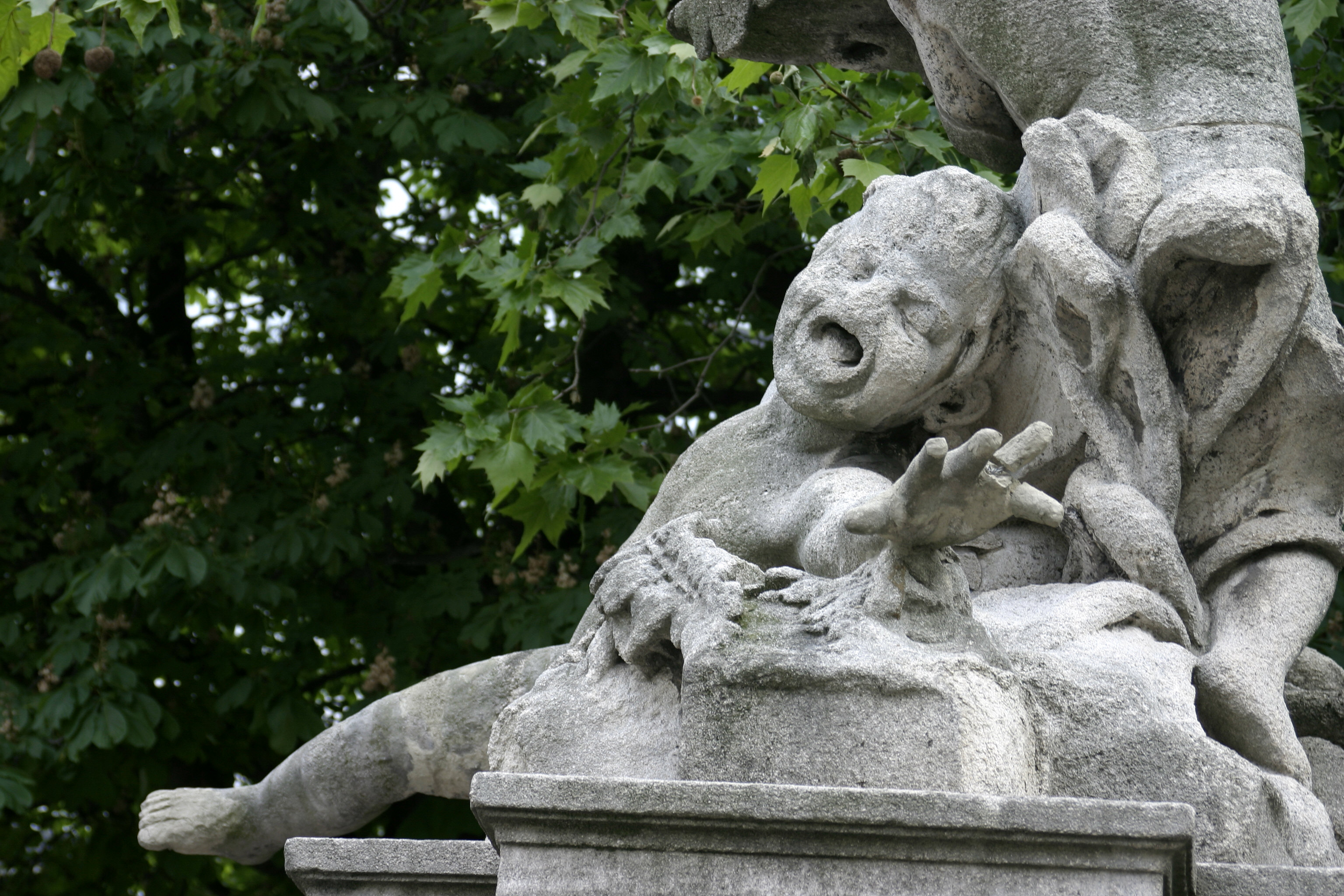
Monument damaged by acid rain.

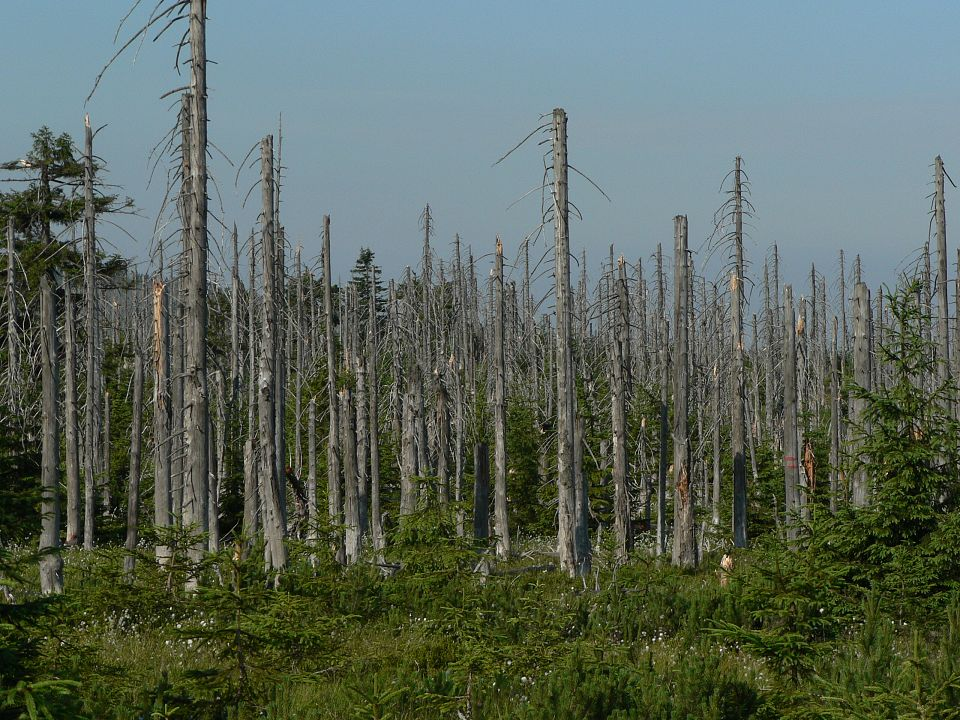
Effects of acid rain in the Jizera Mountains, Czech Republic.

Naturally, water in the atmosphere is slightly acidic. Some pollutants can form strong acids, making rainwater much more acidic. Key acids that cause acid rain are nitric acid (HNO_{3}), sulfuric acid (H_{2}SO_{4}) and hydrochloric acid (HCl). HCl comes from coal combustion. H_{2}SO_{4} forms from SO_{2}, which comes from the burning of coal and oil and from some industrial processes like smelting. HNO_{3} forms from NO_{2}, which is formed during high-temperature combustion. The term acid rain not only refers to rain, but also to pollution from hail, fog, and snow.

Acid rain caused substantial damage in the 1970s, including lake acidification and forest diebacks in Northern Europe. Due to the changed acidity in water bodies and soils, essential nutrients such as magnesium and calcium became soluble and could be washed away. Other elements, such as aluminium, which were toxic to vegetation, became available for the roots to absorb. Acid rain also impacts buildings and statues made of specific stones (e.g. marble, calcite or freestone), as the stone reacts chemically with the acid in the water and erodes.

=== Water and soil pollution ===
Air pollution can settle (deposit) on the soil or in water, causing various problems. For instance, ammonia and nitric acid in the air can contribute to nutrient pollution in water, a process called eutrophication. At first, the extra nutrients help plants grow, but dense plant growth blocks sunlight from reaching the bottom. Plants in the lower layers then die, and with fewer plants producing oxygen, the oxygen level drops. This harms organisms that need oxygen to live, and can lead to the loss of sensitive species.

=== Agricultural effects ===
Various studies have estimated the impacts of air pollution on agriculture, especially ozone. Ozone acts as an oxidant and reduces photosynthesis. One study estimated that for a 1% increase in ozone concentrations, there would be a global economic loss of $10 billion each year. For PM_{2.5}, a 1% increase in pollution levels would lead to about $5 billion in losses, especially in colder climates. After air pollutants enter the agricultural environment, they not only directly affect agricultural production and quality, but also enter agricultural waters and soil. Air pollution further decreases the productivity of laborers via health impacts.

The COVID-19 lockdowns created a natural experiment to examine the links between air quality and agricultural output. In India, the lockdown improved air quality, which enhanced surface greenness and photosynthetic activity. Both forests and crops saw positive effects; the improvement was most pronounced for crops.

=== Economic effects ===
Air pollution has a strong impact on the economy via its health effects – such as reduced productivity at work and the costs of healthcare – and its effects on crop yield. It also affects tourism, biodiversity, forestry, and water quality. Tourism may be negatively affected due to decreased visibility and damage to cultural heritage. People may be more prone to accidents due to air pollution. Increased NO_{2} levels are for instance linked to construction site accidents.

In terms of the welfare cost on human health (non-market costs), a World Bank study found that PM_{2.5} pollution in 2019 cost the world economy over $8 trillion, over 6% of global GDP. In India and China, the loss of GDP was over 10%. About 85% of this loss globally came from the loss of life, the rest from increased ill health. The costs of lives lost are calculated using the Value of Statistical Life, a number that tries to estimate how much people would be willing to pay to reduce their risk of dying. This number differs by country and is difficult to estimate for low- and middle-income countries.

The direct market impacts on productivity loss, healthcare use, and crop losses were estimated to rise to 1% of GDP by 2060, according to the OECD. The Caspian region and China would see the largest impact. Air pollution also has an impact on energy production, as it reduces the amount of sunlight that reaches solar panels. It also causes the panels to become dirty, further reducing their energy output.

== History of air pollution ==
Mummified remains of people in Peru, Egypt and Britain show that ancient people in these regions suffered from blackening of the lungs caused by open fires in poorly ventilated homes. Recorded complaints of air pollution go back to the Greek and Roman period. Outdoor air pollution became a problem with the rise of cities, caused by household smoke and by early industrial activities (such as smelting and mining). In particular, lead levels, found in Arctic ice cores, were about ten times higher in the Roman period than in the period before.

=== Industrial Revolution ===
During the Industrial Revolution, outdoor air pollution started to rise strongly, mostly due to the large-scale burning of coal. This occurred first in Britain, then in the rest of Northern Europe and the United States. By the 19th century, buildings around industrial plants started to blacken, while plants and trees in public parks started to wither. Smoke-induced fogs reduced the amount of sunlight city-dwellers got, contributing to cases of rickets, a childhood disease caused by lack of sunlight and poor diet.

However, the business and political leadership of the industrial cities were enthusiastic backers of the industry: heavy black smoke meant prosperity, high profits, and high wages.

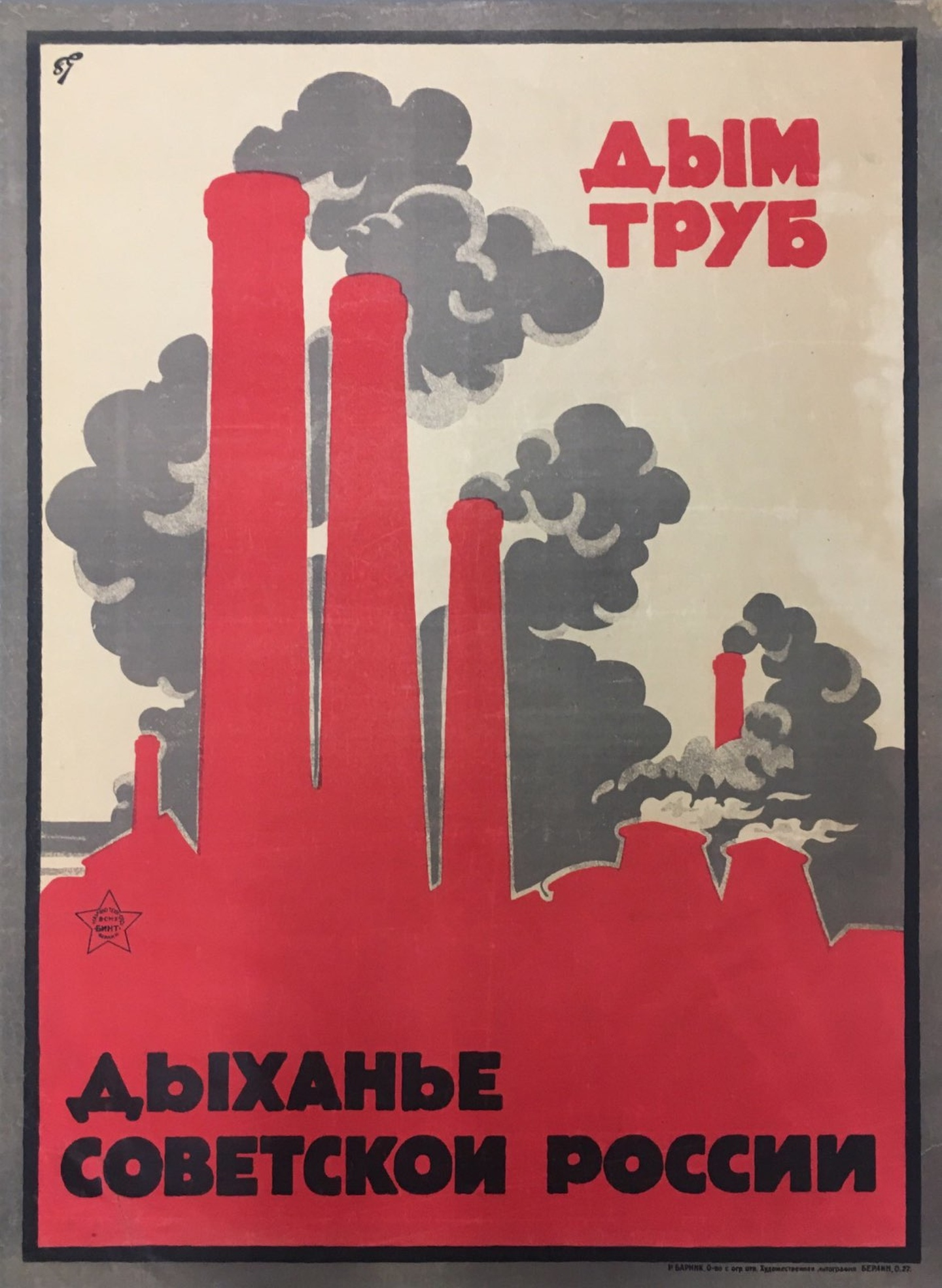
Poster in the Soviet Union praising "The smoke of chimneys is the breath of Soviet Russia."

=== Trends ===
Globally, there has been a trend towards improved air quality worldwide from 2013 to 2023 with PM2.5 levels decreasing, particularly in Southeast Asia, East Asia and Oceania.

The United States has seen many improvements in air quality in every major pollutants with significant reductions in carbon monoxide, nitrogen dioxide, lead and more in the 21st century. However smoke pollution from wildfires in the early 2020s has slowed or reversed the progress made on air quality in many states.

=== Miasma theory ===
The miasma theory was a prominent idea in the 18th and 19th centuries that gave a false explanation of how deadly epidemics like cholera, yellow fever, and malaria ("bad air") originated and spread. It said that illnesses were caused by breathing in a mysterious "miasma," a harmful vapor that arose from decaying organic matter. Epidemics often came in the summer because that is when people spent more time outside. The theory motivated an enormous emphasis on public sanitation in major cities to remove smelly pollution, especially human and animal excrement, from streets and back alleys. The theory collapsed when physicians accepted the new germ theory of disease in the late 19th century. Germs coughed up by an infected person or spread by certain types of mosquitoes or hookworms were the real reason people caught an infectious disease.

=== Anti-smoke action and modern protections ===
In the 1830s, anti-smoke groups emerged in Britain, followed by groups in the United States in the 1880s. Legislation against pollution was weak however, as it was seen to conflict with industrial interests. During the interwar period of 1920s and 1930s, a move from coal to gas and oil meant there was less air pollution, but this trend reversed when World War II broke out. The United Kingdom suffered its worst air pollution during the 1952 Great Smog of London, with some 12,000 deaths, which led to the Clean Air Act 1956. The 1948 Donora smog in the US, killing 20 people, prompted the US to start regulating air pollution. Japan followed in 1960, but other heavily polluted regions, such as the Soviet Union and China, did not implement effective regulation.

Technological disasters have caused severe problems with air pollution. The world's worst pollution disaster was the 1984 Bhopal Disaster in India. Leaked industrial vapours from the Union Carbide factory (later bought by the Dow Chemical Company), killed at least 20,000 people and affected about 600,000.

In the 1950s, smog in developed countries was regulated, but other pollutants were not. Acid rain, caused by sulfur dioxide, became a major issue as it spread across borders. In the 1990s, for instance, Japan experienced acid rain from Chinese and Korean industry. International cooperation was needed to curb acid rain, and various coalitions were started. In 1975, it was discovered that certain chemicals caused a hole in the ozone layer; thanks to successful international negotiations, these chemicals were banned worldwide. There has been far less success in combatting climate change, and greenhouse gas emissions, mostly from fossil fuels, continue to rise.

== Measurement and monitoring ==
=== Monitoring ===
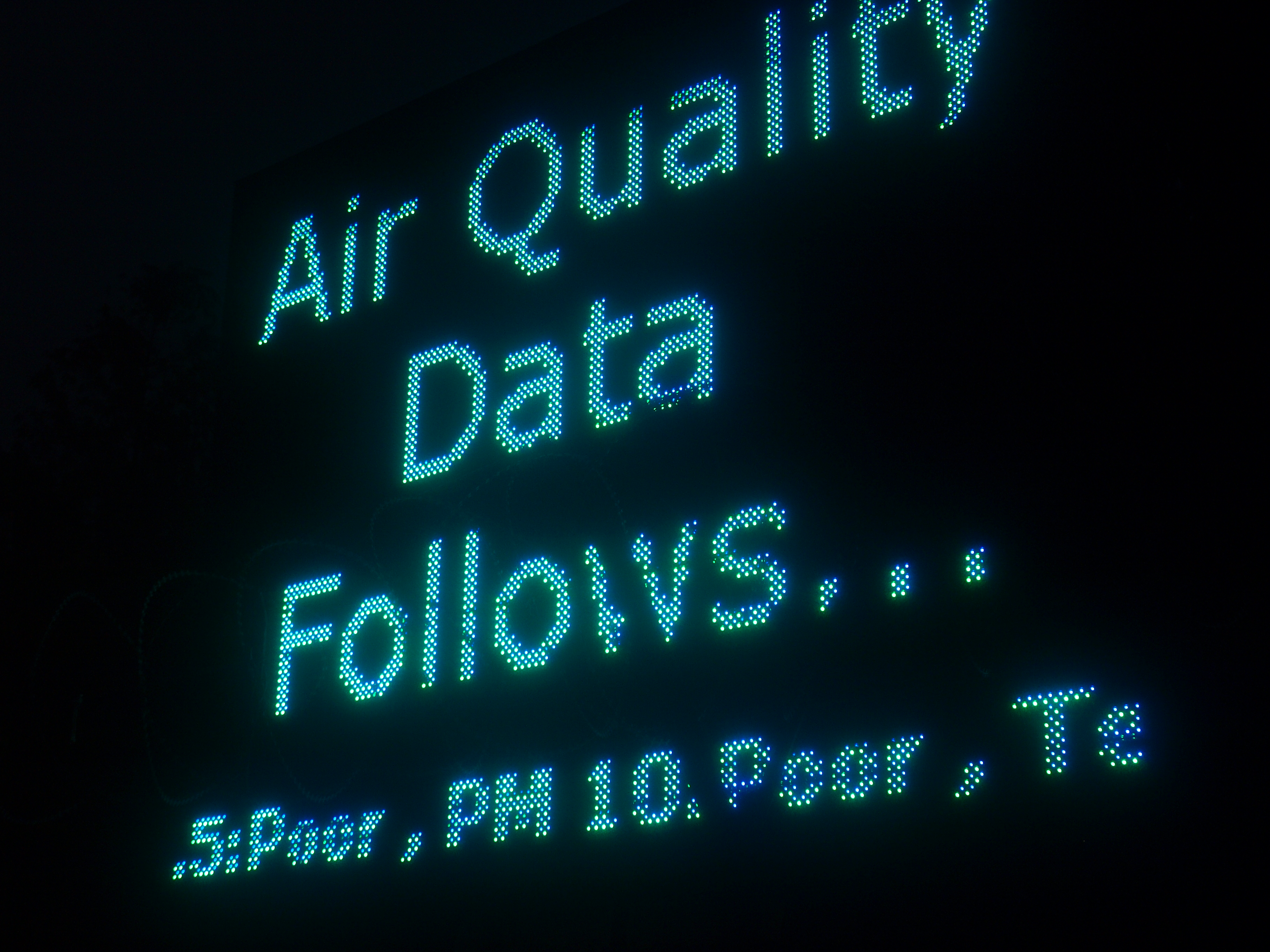
Air quality monitoring, New Delhi, India.

Air pollution can be monitored using different techniques. For instance, satellites and remote sensing are used to track PM, NO_{2,} and ozone. Many regions have a network of monitoring stations, with good coverage in India, China, Europe, and the US. Poor coverage exists however for a number of highly polluted countries, such as Chad and Iran. The density of measurements is improving as there are more low-cost techniques to measure air pollution. Low-cost monitors can also be used for indoor air quality monitoring. Finally, air quality sensors can be incorporated into drones to measure air pollution higher up in the air. Some websites attempt to map air pollution levels using available data.

Air quality indexes (AQIs) offer a simple way to communicate changes in air quality and associated health risks to a wide audience. An AQI is essentially a health protection tool people can use to help reduce their short-term exposure to air pollution by adjusting activity levels during increased levels of air pollution. These indexes can indicate when air quality is good, when it is dangerous for sensitive groups (e.g. children with asthma) and when it is a general hazard.

=== Modelling and inventories ===
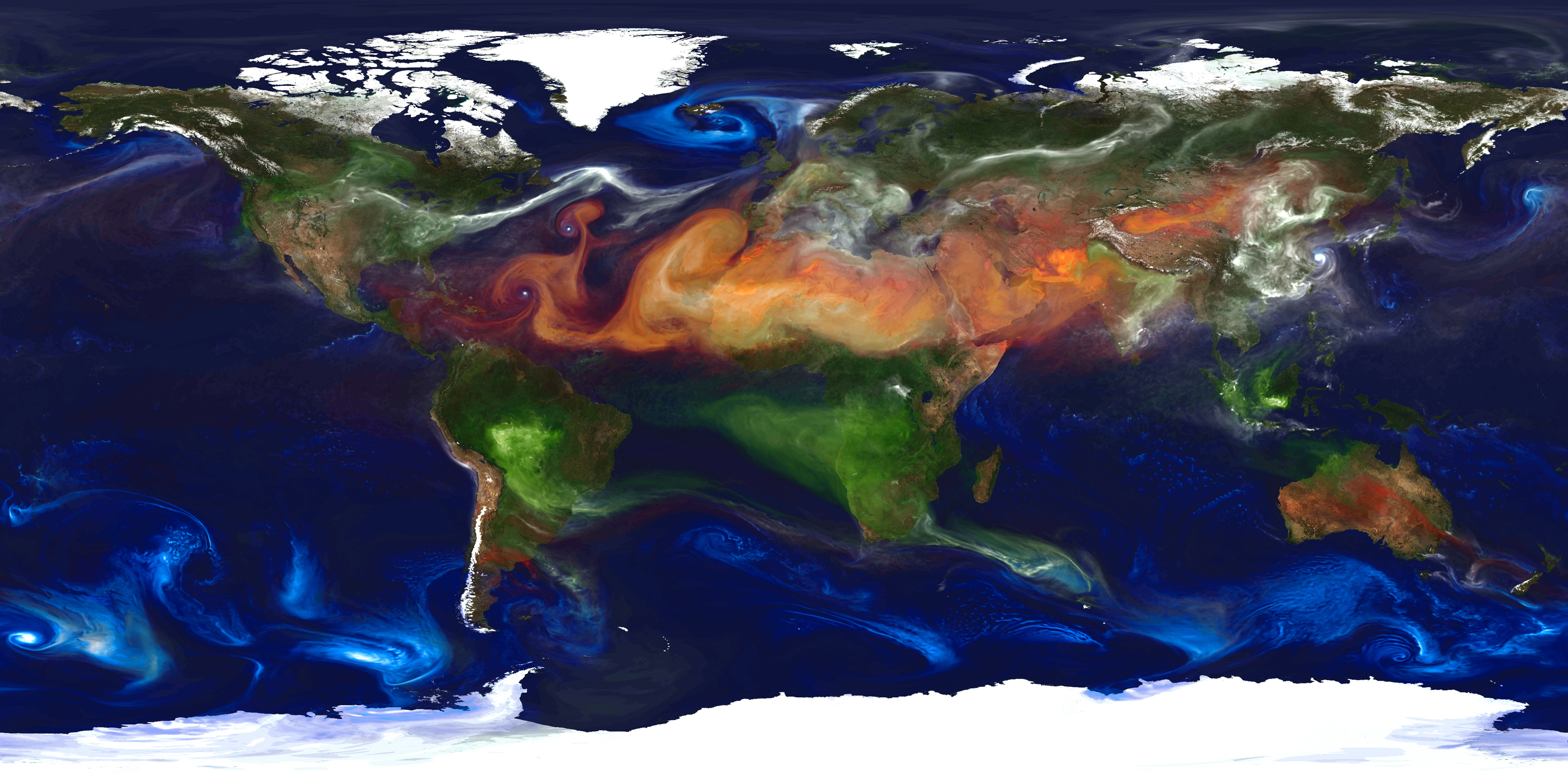
Map of simulated particle pollution. Wildfire smoke is in green, desert dust is in orange, light blue is sea salt, and white shows sulfate particle pollution.

When direct data is unavailable or when projecting future air pollutant levels, estimates can be derived using models or emission factors. Air pollutant emission factors are typical values that link the amount of a pollutant released into the air to a related activity. This could for instance be the typical amount of particulate matter released from a coal-power station. The United States Environmental Protection Agency has published a compilation of air pollutant emission factors for a wide range of industrial sources, as did the European Environment Agency.

Air quality models use meteorological and emissions data to simulate how pollutants disperse and react in the atmosphere. Regulatory agencies use them to assess whether a new source of air pollution would exceed acceptable pollution levels, for permitting purposes. They can also be used to predict future pollution levels under different policy scenarios. There are models for local pollution, but also for cross-boundary pollution.

== Pollution reduction by sector ==
Pollution prevention seeks to prevent pollution such as air pollution and could include adjustments to industrial and business activities such as designing sustainable manufacturing processes (and the products' designs) as well as efforts towards renewable energy transitions.

=== Industry and waste ===
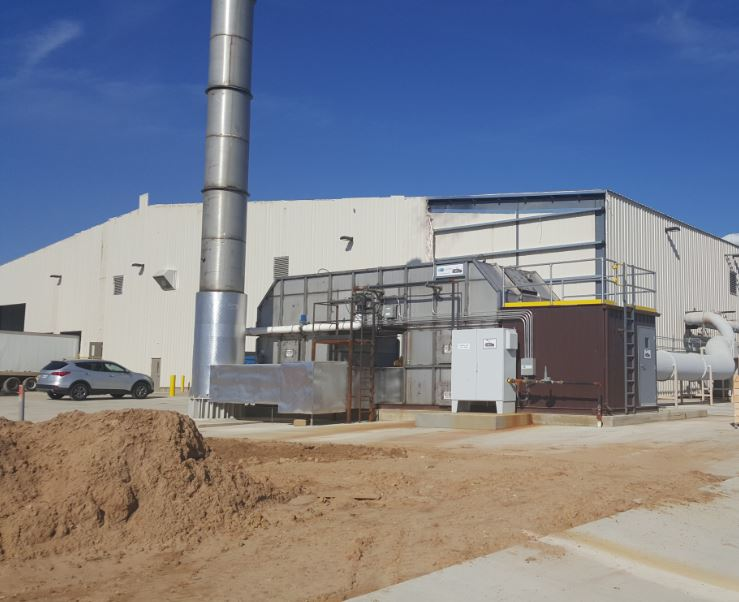
Thermal oxidisers are air pollution abatement options for hazardous air pollutants (HAPs), volatile organic compounds (VOCs), and odorous emissions.

Various pollution control technologies and strategies are available to reduce air pollution. For instance, industrial plants can install scrubbers, such as flue-gas desulfurization or catalysts to remove NO_{x}. In the power sector, a very effective means to reduce air pollution is the transition to renewable energy (e.g. solar and wind energy) or nuclear power. Switching from coal-fired power plants to fossil gas reduces air pollution, but does not eliminate it.

A growing number of countries regulate waste, through national or city-wide waste management systems, opening managed landfills, landfill gas capture (for electricity production), and waste separation. In agriculture, air pollution can be minimized by not overusing fertilizers and by not feeding excess protein to livestock.

=== Transport ===
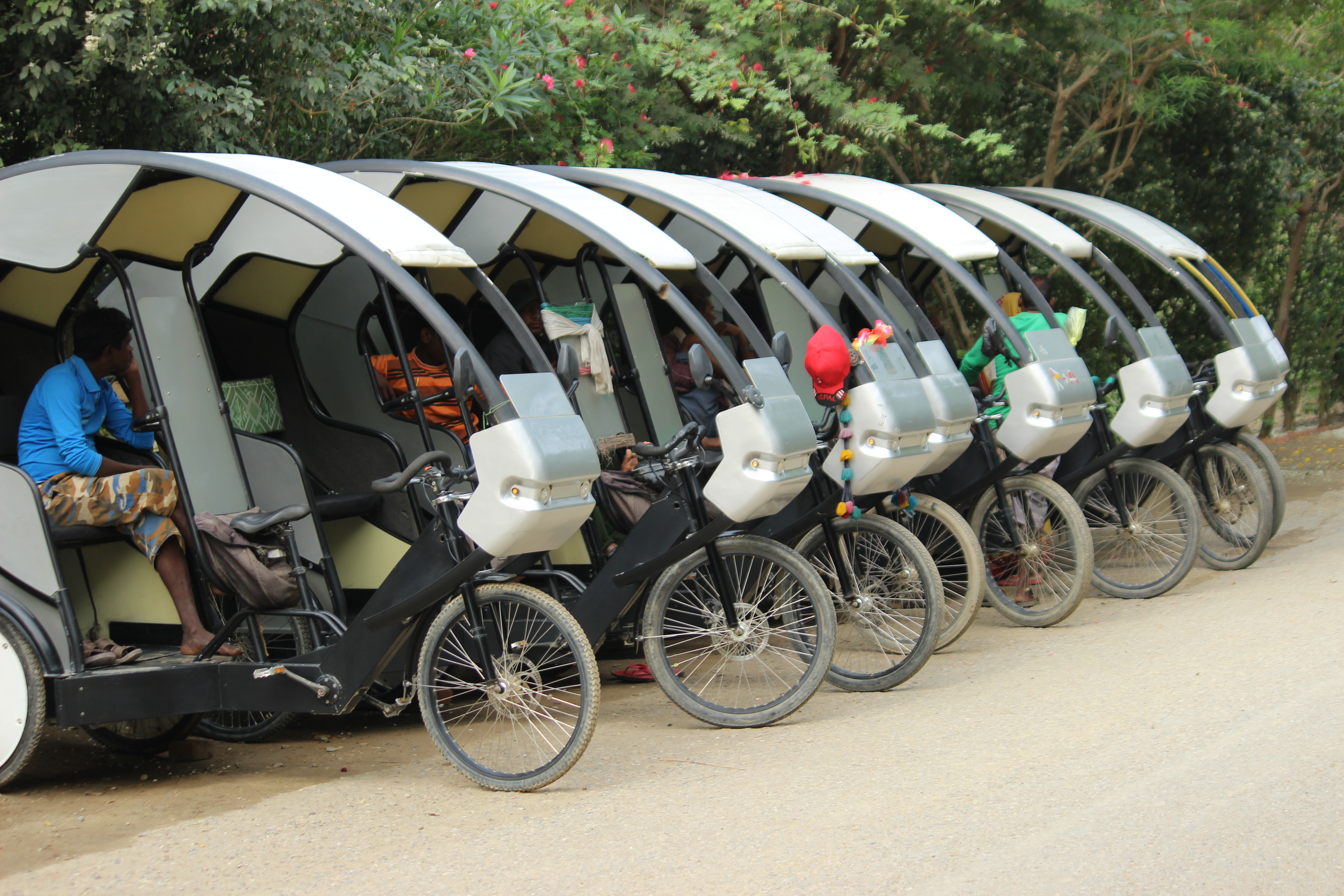
Electric rickshaws in Nepal.

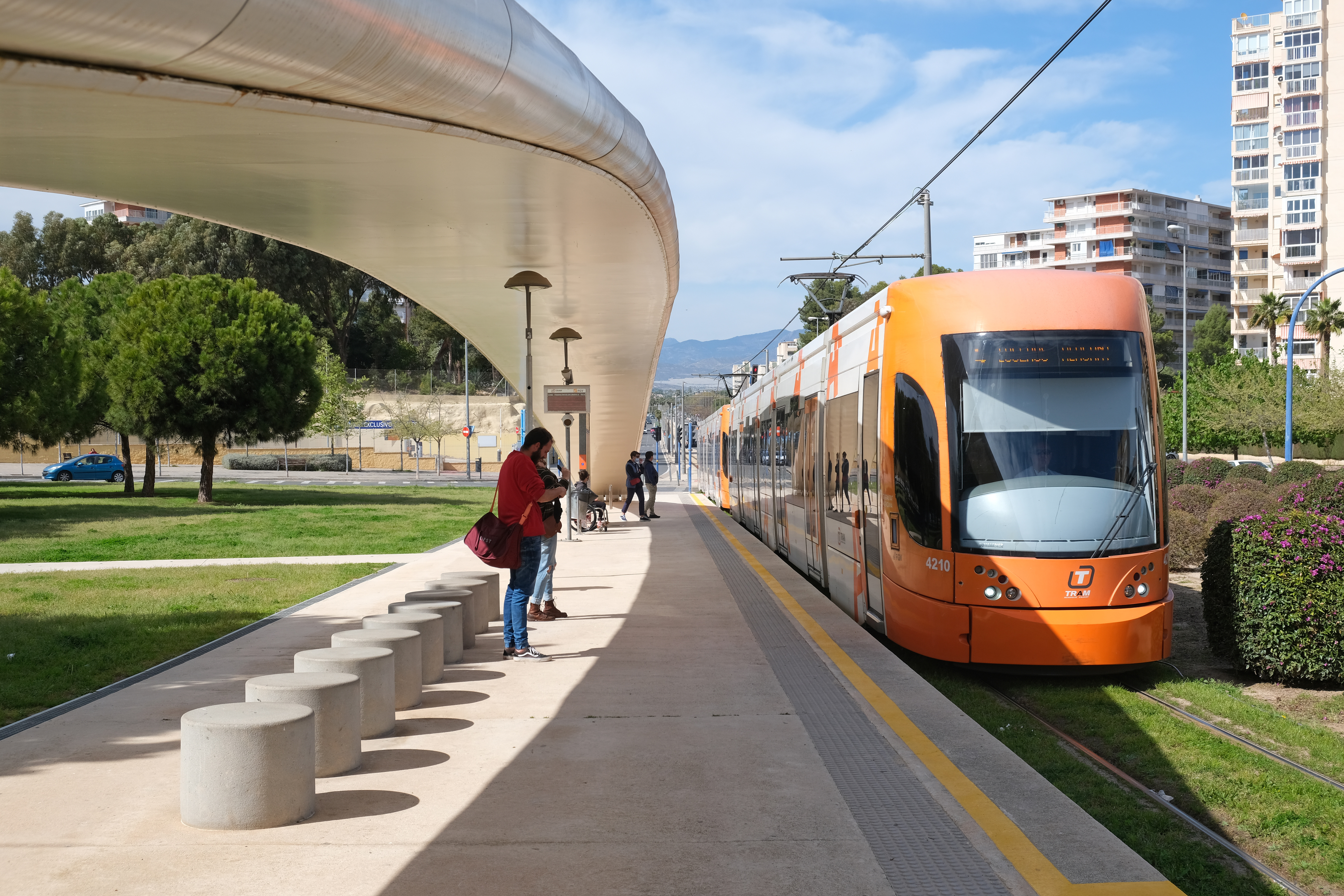
Tram in Alicante, Spain.

The avoid-shift-improve framework groups efforts to cut pollution from vehicles into reducing travel, shifting to sustainable transport, and improving vehicle technology. Reducing motor vehicle travel can curb pollution. One strategy is to build compact cities, so that amenities are close by and cars are not needed. Motor traffic can be reduced by creating more walkable cities and by investing in cycling infrastructure. Working from home is another way of avoiding motorized traffic.

Traffic can be shifted to cleaner modes of transport by increasing use of public transport, for instance through higher parking fees or offering free public transport. Tackling congestion, which increases fuel usage, with congestion charging, also shifts people to use cleaner modes of transport. Finally, road vehicles can be improved from increased fuel efficiency, improved quality of fuels, emission standards, and conversion to electric vehicles. For example, buses in New Delhi, India, switched to compressed natural gas after 2000, to reduce the city's thick pea soup smog.

In 2006, Lawrence D. Frank and his co-authors demonstrated that a 5% increase in walkability was associated with many benefits, including a 6.5% reduction in vehicle miles driven, a 5.6% reduction in grams of nitrogen oxides emissions, and a 5.5% emission reduction of volatile organic compounds (VOCs).

=== Cooking, lighting and heating ===
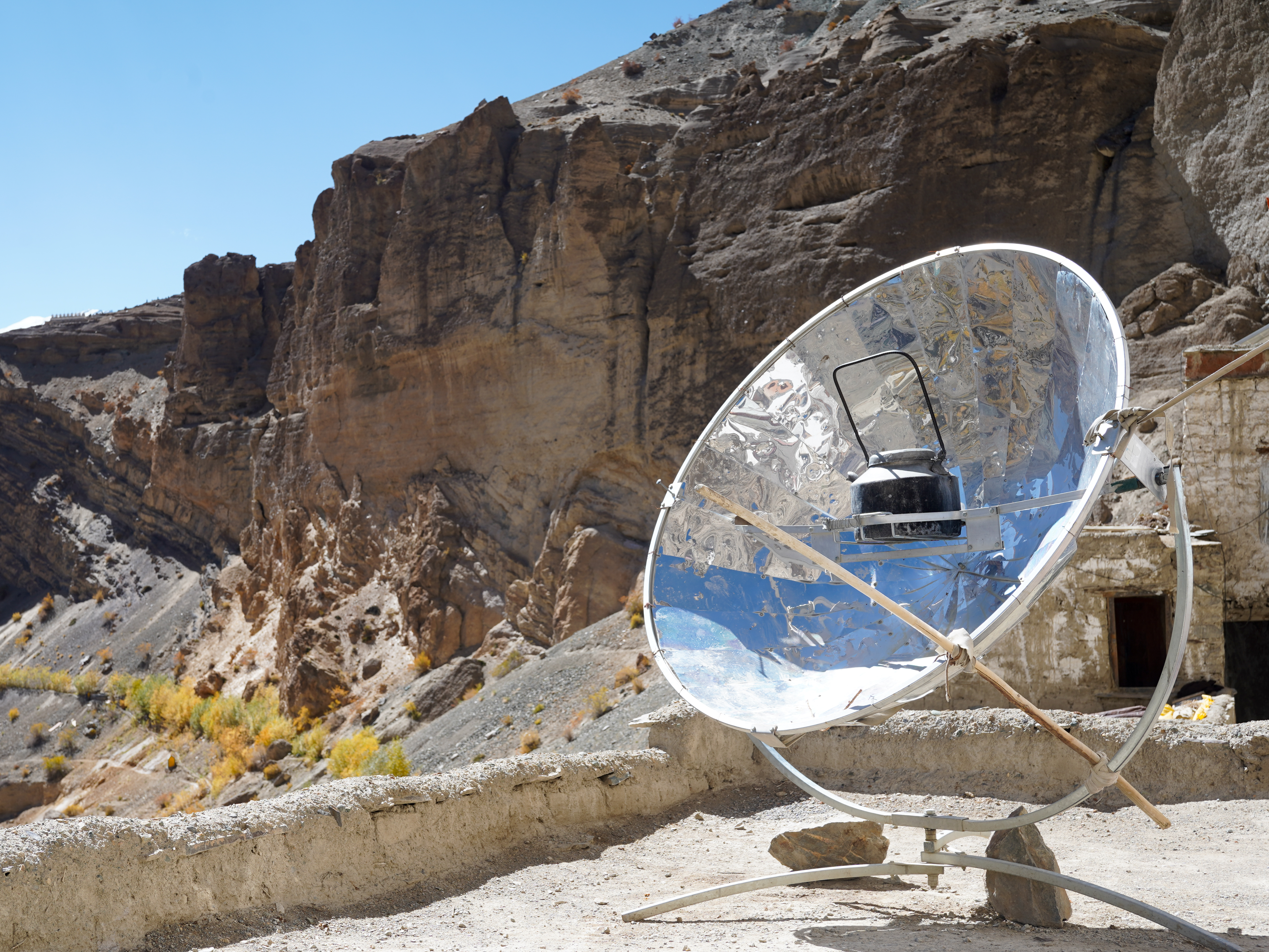
A kettle heated by a solar cooker at the Phugtal Monastery in Ladakh, India.

Various technologies are available for clean cooking, to replace traditional biomass stoves or three-stone fires. For example, a switch to cooking with biogas, bioethanol, electricity, natural gas, or LPG (liquified petroleum gas) significantly reduces air pollution. Improved cook stoves, which use biomass more efficiently, improve air quality less, but can be an intermediate solution if clean cook stoves or their fuels are not available. These clean cooking devices, including those run on fossil fuels, usually have a smaller climate impact than traditional biomass stoves.

Kerosene for lighting can be replaced with efficient LED lights, for instance, solar-powered LED lights. Combustion of fossil fuels for space heating can be replaced by the use of electricity in heat pumps. Ventilation improves indoor air quality, but leads to outdoor air pollution, which can in turn reduce local indoor air quality.

== Policy and regulation ==
=== Laws and regulations ===
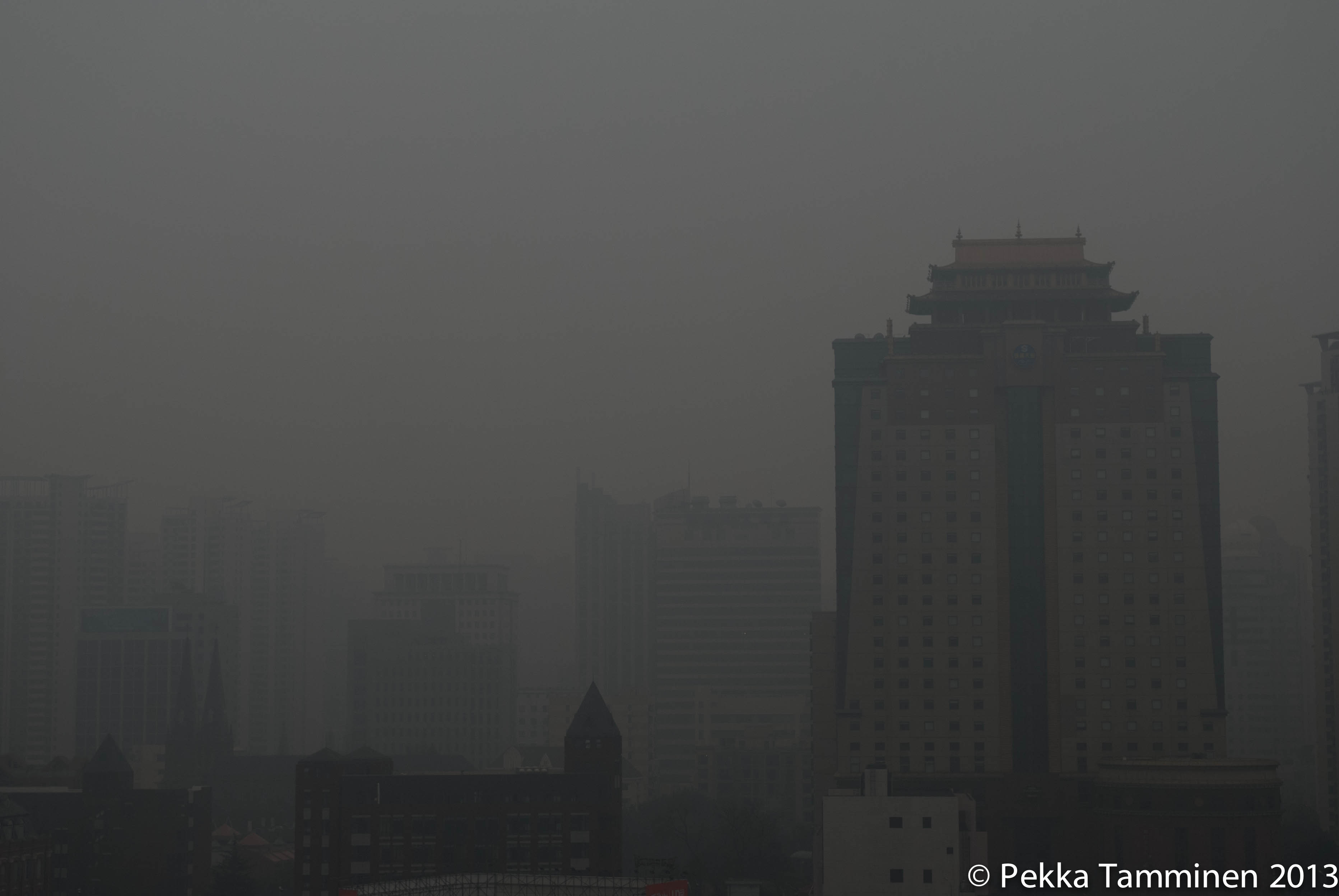
Air pollution in Shanghai, China, in 2013. China launched a "war against pollution" in 2014, which drastically lowered particle pollution levels across the country.

Although a majority of countries have air pollution laws, 43% of countries lack a legal definition of air pollution, 34% lack outdoor air quality standards, and just 31% have laws for tackling pollution originating from outside their borders. Few countries have limits that are as strict as the World Health Organization's recommendations.

Some air pollution laws include specific air quality standards, such as the U.S. National Ambient Air Quality Standards and E.U. Air Quality Directive, which specify maximum atmospheric concentrations for specific pollutants. Other examples of air quality laws around the world include the Clean Air Act in Britain, the US Clean Air Act, and the TA Luft in Germany. Air pollution laws might also put limits on the emissions of air pollutants, e.g. from vehicles.

The World Health Organization's Global Air Quality Guidelines encourage improvements in a similar way to national standards, but are "recommendations" and "good practice" rather than mandatory targets that countries must achieve.

Some air pollution action has been successful at the international level, such as the Montreal Protocol, which phased out harmful ozone-depleting chemicals. It was ratified worldwide. On the other hand, international action on climate change, has been less successful. The 1997 Kyoto Protocol introduced modest reduction targets for some countries but lacked strong enforcement, while the 2015 Paris Agreement set no binding limits, instead encouraging all countries to raise their ambition over time.

=== Clean air as a human right ===
In 2022, the UN General Assembly passed a resolution recognizing the right to a clean, healthy, and sustainable environment as a human right. The resolution is not legally binding. This resolution followed the declaration from the UN Human Rights Council published earlier that year.

While many countries have air pollution laws, they differ in how they can be enforced via litigation. In the European Union, individual countries, including France, have been fined by the EU for not complying with air quality rules. The revised Ambient Air Quality Directive also makes it possible for individuals in the EU to seek compensation. While China allows litigation on environmental grounds, it is rare as it is seen as risky. In Chile, the right to a healthy environment is part of the constitution, and the Supreme Court found that the government has to act to provide clear air because of this.

== See also ==
- Air stagnation
- Atmospheric chemistry
- Global Atmosphere Watch
- Global dimming
- List of smogs by death toll
- Sustainable energy
