= Lucia A. Reisch =

German behavioural economist

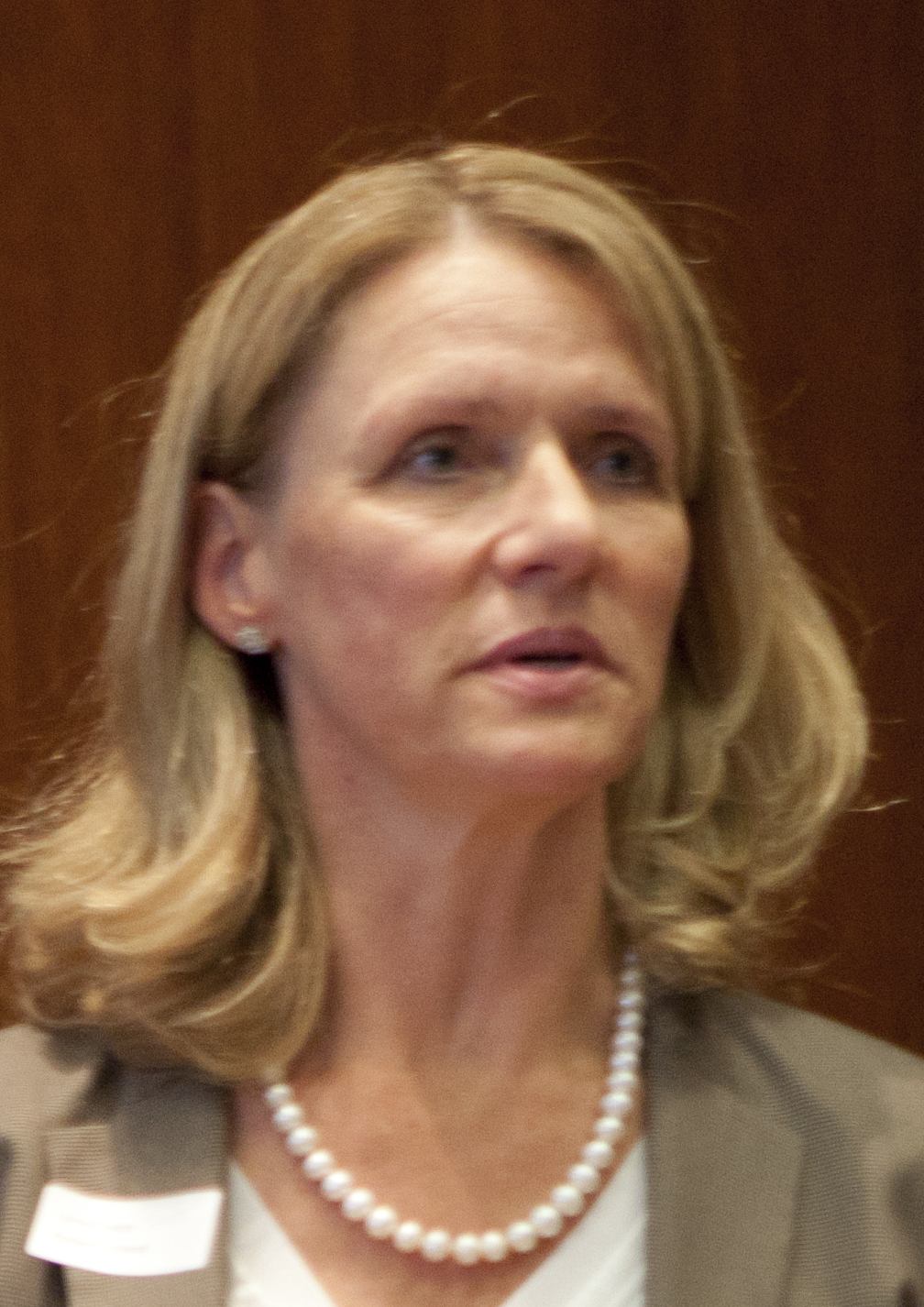
- Born: Stuttgart, Germany

Academic background
- Education: University of Hohenheim (PhD)

Academic work
- Discipline: Economist
- Sub-discipline: Behavioural economics
- Institutions: University of Cambridge; El-Erian Institute of Behavioural Economics and Policy; Queens' College, University of Cambridge; Copenhagen Business School

Lucia A. Reisch (born 7 September 1964) is a German behavioural economist and social scientist by training and the inaugural El-Erian Professor of Behavioural Economics and Policy at the University of Cambridge since September 2021. Since April 2022 this Chair has been based at the Cambridge Judge Business School. Reisch is a Professorial Fellow and the Deputy Dean of Queens’ College, Cambridge.

Before joining Cambridge, Reisch was a professor at Copenhagen Business School. She also holds an honorary Leibniz Professorship from Leibniz Institute for Prevention Research in Bremen, and is a Fellow of the Royal Economic Society.

== Early life and education ==
After having studied economics and social science at the University of Hohenheim (with semesters at UCLA), Reisch graduated in 1988. In 1994 she received her doctorate in economics also from the University of Hohenheim.

== Career ==
Reisch has served as a lecturer at the University of Hohenheim, Technical University of Munich and gave guest lectures at the University of St Gallen (CH) and University of Aarhus / Aarhus School of Business. From September 2021 Reisch held the El-Erian Professor of Behavioural Economics and Policy at the University of Cambridge. In this role she is responsible for building and leading the new El-Erian Institute, situated within the Cambridge Judge Business School as of April 2022. Previously she held a full professorship at the Copenhagen Business School, Department of Management, Society and Communication, CBS Sustainability. At CBS she founded the Consumer and Behavioral Insights Group (CBIG).

Her research focus is behavioural economics and policy, consumer research, sustainable development, and consumer policy. She was previously the Editor in Chief of the Journal of Consumer Policy. Based on her scientific reputation she was elected to become one of the 400 lifelong members of Germany's Academy of Science and Engineering (Acatech). In addition to her professorship at the University of Cambridge she also holds a Leibniz Professorship at the Leibniz Institute for Prevention Research and Epidemiology - BIPS (Germany).

Reisch is the inaugural director and founder of the El-Erian Institute for Behavioural Economics and Policy at Cambridge Judge Business School, which researches human behaviour and decision-making to inform public policy and address social challenges.

== Other activities ==
In 2011, Reisch was appointed by German Chancellor Angela Merkel to join the Ethics Commission for Safe Energy Supply that assessed, after the Fukushima Daiichi nuclear disaster, the potentials of a nuclear phase-out (by 2022) and therewith help prepare Germany's energy transition. She has been member and Chairwoman of the Scientific Advisory Board for Consumer, Food, and Nutrition Policies to the German Federal Ministry of Consumer Protection, Food and Agriculture (2002‐2011). She was a long-standing member of the German Council for Sustainable Development (2010-2019) and the German Bioeconomy Council, both consulting the German government. Between 2014 and 2018, she chaired the Scientific Advisory Board for Consumer Affairs (Sachverständigenrat für Verbraucherfragen) at the German Federal Ministry of Justice and Consumer Protection. She was also a member of the oversight panel of the International Science Council's project "COVID-19 and implications for national and global policy".

Since 2016 she is member and spokesperson of the Sustainability Board of Dr. Ing. h.c. Porsche AG, which advises the executive board on orienting the sports car company's strategy towards sustainability. Reisch is also a member of the advisory boards of academic and governmental platforms including the University of Sussex' Bennett Institute for Innovation and Policy Acceleration, EU-funded food waste project ROSETTA and the Global Association of Applied Behavioural Scientists (GAABS).

Reisch regularly takes part in lectures and other public speaking engagements. In March 2023 she delivered the Annual LSE Behavioural Public Policy Lecture on the topic of behaviourally-informed food policies. In November 2024, she spoke on a session on sustainable consumption as part of the OECD's COP29 Virtual Pavillion. And in 2025, Reisch took part in a panel at the City of London's Net Zero Delivery Summit 2025 about carbon markets.

== Research areas ==
- Behavioural economics and policy
- Consumer research
- Sustainable development
- Consumer policy

== Selected bibliography ==
Reisch has authored more than 300 research articles and books, and published over 140 papers in peer-reviewed journals. Her research has gained recognition in various newspapers and magazines, including Die Zeit, Der Stern, Die Welt, Der Spiegel, Süddeutsche Zeitung, and Scientific American. More recently, work co-authored by Reisch has been featured in The Conversation and The Guardian.

In addition, Reisch has been featured on various broadcast platforms, such as BBC 4, Deutschland Radio, Deutschlandfunk, SWR, BBC, Australian Broadcasting Corporation (ABC) and Mexican National TV.

Listed are some of her most notable publications.

=== Books ===
- 2023. Cass R. Sunstein & Lucia A. Reisch (Eds.). Research Handbook on nudges and society. Cheltenham: Edward Elgar.
- 2019. Cass R. Sunstein & Lucia A. Reisch. Trusting nudges: Toward a bill of rights for nudging. London: Routledge.
- 2015. Lucia A. Reisch & John Thøgersen (Eds.). Handbook of research on sustainable consumption. Cheltenham: Edward Elgar Publishing.

=== Journal articles ===
- 2026. Micha Kaiser, Malte Dewies, David Lin, Cass R. Sunstein, Lucia A. Reisch. Socioeconomic status mostly outweighs psychological factors in predicting individual ecological footprints. Communications Earth & Environment. https://doi.org/10.1038/s43247-026-03521-z
- 2026. Paul M. Lohmann, Alice Pizzo, Jan M. Bauer, Tarun M. Khanna, Sarah L. Flecke, Max Callaghan, Jan C. Minx, Lucia A. Reisch. A meta-analysis assessing the effectiveness of demand-side interventions for sustainable food consumption and food waste reduction. Nature Food. https://doi.org/10.1038/s43016-025-01279-9
- 2026. Alice Pizzo, Jan M. Bauer, Lucia A. Reisch. Informational nudges or incentives? A field experiment on vegetarian choices. Ecological Economics. https://doi-org.ezp.lib.cam.ac.uk/10.1016/j.ecolecon.2025.108882.
- 2025. Lisa Eckmann, Lucia A. Reisch. Shifting toward quality: how communicating “cost per wear” influences consumer preference for clothing. Psychology & Marketing. https://onlinelibrary.wiley.com/doi/10.1002/mar.70061
- 2025. Michael Bissel, Maike Gossen, Lucia A. Reisch, Cass R. Sunstein. Driving sustainable change: A systematic map of behaviorally informed interventions to promote sustainable mobility behavior. PNAS Nexus. https://doi.org/10.1093/pnasnexus/pgaf162
- 2025. Malte Dewies, Lucia A. Reisch. META BI: A tool for describing behavioural interventions. Behavioural Public Policy. https://doi.org/10.1017/bpp.2025.10015
- 2023. Leonie Decrinis, Wolfgang Freibichler, Micha Kaiser, Cass R. Sunstein, Lucia A. Reisch. Sustainable Behaviour at Work: How Message Framing Encourages Employees to Choose Electric Vehicles. Business Strategy and the Environment. https://doi.org/10.1002/bse.3441.
- 2021. Lucia A. Reisch. Shaping healthy and sustainable food systems with behavioural food policy. European Review of Agricultural Economics, 48(4), 665–693. doi: 10.1093/erae/jbab024.
- 2021. Lucia A. Reisch, Cass R. Sunstein & Micha Kaiser. What do people want to know? Information avoidance and food policy implications. Food Policy, 102, Article 102076. doi: 10.1016/j.foodpol.2021.102076
- 2020. Kaiser, Micha; Bernauer, Manuela; Sunstein, Cass R.; Reisch, Lucia A. "The power of green defaults: The impact of regional variation of opt-out tariffs on green energy demand in Germany". Ecological Economics. 174: 106685. doi:10.1016/j.ecolecon.2020.106685.
- 2019. Sunstein, Cass R.; Reisch, Lucia A.; Kaiser, Micha. "Trusting nudges? Lessons from an international survey". Journal of European Public Policy. 26 (10): 1417–1443. doi:10.1080/13501763.2018.1531912.
- 2019. Sunstein, Cass R.; Reisch, Lucia A. Trusting nudges: Toward a bill of rights for nudging (1 ed.). London: Routledge. ISBN 978-0-367-46055-6.
- 2016. Reisch, Lucia A.; Sunstein, Cass R. "Do Europeans like nudges?". Judgment and Decision Making. 11 (4): 310–325.
- 2016. Sunstein, Cass R.; Reisch, Lucia A. (Eds.) The economics of nudge (1 ed.). Routledge Major Works Collection. Critical Concepts in Economics. London: Routledge. ISBN 978-1-138-93853-3.
- 2014. Sunstein, Cass R.; Reisch, Lucia A. "Automatically green: Behavioral economics and environmental protection". Harvard Environmental Law Review. 38: 127–158.
