= Bärbel-Maria Kurth =

German statistician and epidemiologist

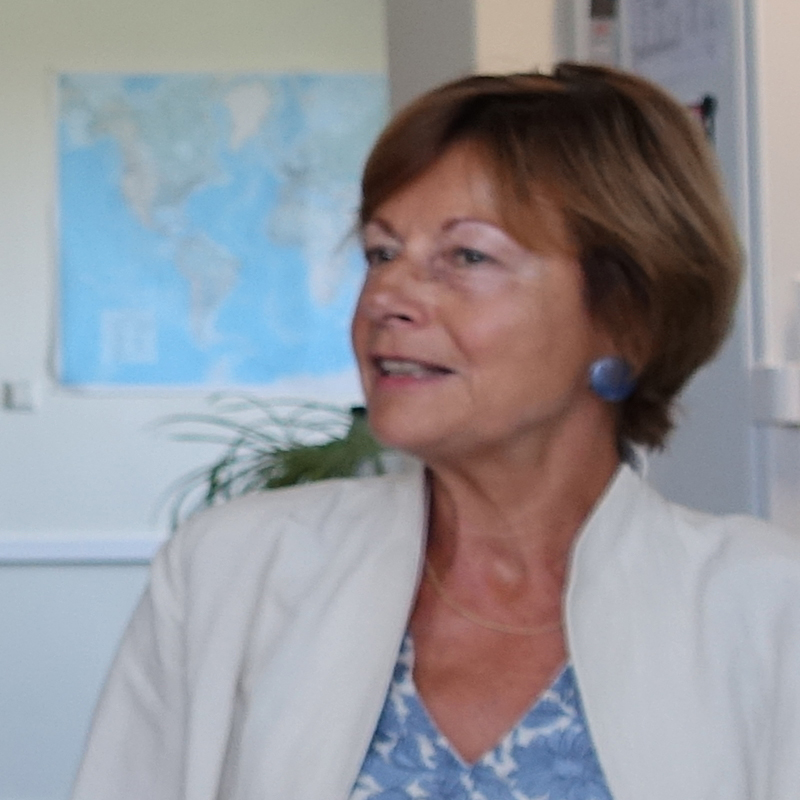
Bärbel-Maria Kurth in 2018

Bärbel-Maria Kurth (born 6 August 1954 in Freiberg, Germany) is a German statistician and epidemiologist. From 1998 to 2019, she headed the Department of Epidemiology and Health Monitoring at the Robert Koch Institute in Berlin. In 1998, she initiated the first nationwide health survey. Subsequently, she and her department established a continuous health monitoring system for Germany.

== Life ==
Bärbel-Maria Kurth studied mathematics at the Humboldt University of Berlin (1973–1978) and received her doctorate in 1981 with a thesis in the field of theoretical statistics. After ten years of university research and teaching at the Humboldt University and the University of Hamburg, she became head of the Department of Environmental Epidemiology in 1992 and head of the Department of Health Risks and Prevention at the Institute for Social Medicine and Epidemiology of the Federal Health Agency in Berlin in 1994.

After the dissolution of the Federal Health Agency, she was head of the department for "Noncommunicable Diseases and Health Reporting" at the Robert Koch Institute from 1995. From 1998 to 2019 she was head of the Department of Epidemiology and Health Monitoring. Here she promoted research into public health-relevant diseases in accordance with the "WHO global action plan for the prevention and control of noncommunicable diseases 2013–2020".

At the Robert Koch Institute, Kurth led the establishment of a nationwide health monitoring system for non-communicable diseases (NCD) in children and adults. She initiated the first nationwide survey, the Federal Health Survey 1997/1998, and from then on persistently pursued her vision of establishing continuous health monitoring in Germany. The overriding goal of the monitoring, which has been running continuously since 2007, is to improve the health of the population.

Kurth's research focuses on child and adolescent health, overweight and obesity, health in demographic change, and epidemiological and statistical methods. She has given important impulses for the further development of health reporting and has founded the Future Forum Public Health together with people who are active in science and practice. In addition to her publications, she has been co-editor of the "Report Versorgungsforschung" series of the German Medical Association (BÄK) since 2010.

== Awards ==
- 1978: Karl-Weierstrass Prize of the Humboldt University for outstanding mathematical achievements
- 1981: Humboldt Award of Humboldt University Berlin for outstanding scientific achievements
- 2005: Johann Peter Frank Medal of the Federal Association of Doctors and Dentists of the Public Health Service
- 2016: Solomon Neumann Medal of the German Society for Social Medicine and Prevention (DGSMP)

== Functions and memberships (selection) ==
- Member of the steering group of the Action Programme Environment and Health of the Federal Ministry of Health (BMG) and the Federal Ministry for the Environment, Nature Conservation and Nuclear Safety (BMU) (1996–2008)
- Member of the Standing Coordination Committee of the Federal Centre for Health Education (BZgA) (1996–2009)
- Member of the editorial board of the Bundesgesundheitsblatt (1998–2013)
- Chair and vice-chair of the German Society of Epidemiology (DGEpi) (1999–2003)
- Member of the Scientific Advisory Board of the Federal Association of Doctors and Dentists of the Public Health Service (2000–2013)
- Founding member and spokesperson of the Interdisciplinary Epidemiological Research Network Berlin (EpiBerlin) (2002–2004)
- Representative of Germany in the "Network of Competent Authorities in Health Information and Knowledge" of the European Commission (2003–2009)
- Member of the Scientific Advisory Board of the KORA study of the GSF Munich (2004–2009)
- Member of the steering group "Health Goals" of the Society for Insurance Science and Design (GVG) (2005–2014)
- Member of the Scientific Advisory Board (2005–2017) and Deputy Chair of the Scientific Advisory Board (2010–2016) of the German Medical Association (BÄK)
- Member of the Board of the Scientific Advisory Board of the German Medical Association (BÄK) (2006–2016)
- Member of the Steering Committee ESC of the National Cohort (NAKO Health Study) (since 2009)
- Member of the Scientific Advisory Board of the Federal Centre for Health Education (BZgA) (since 2009)
- Member of the supervisory board and Scientific Advisory Board of the German Society for Biotechnological Research (now Helmholtz Centre for Infection Research) in Braunschweig (appointed by the Federal Minister of Education and Research) (2010–2014)
- Member of the Council for Social and Economic Data (RatSWD) (2011–2013)
- Member of the Scientific Advisory Board of the Socio-Economic Panel (SOEP) (2011–2018)
- Founding member of the Future Forum Public Health (since 2016)

== Publications (selection) ==
- Bärbel Bellach: Parameterschätzungen in linearen stochastischen Differentialgleichungen und ihre asymptotischen Eigenschaften. Dissertation A. Humboldt-Universität, Berlin 1981.
- Bärbel Bellach: Remarks on the use of Pearson's correlation coefficient and other association measures in assessing validity and reliability of dietary assessment methods. In: European journal of clinical nutrition. Band 47, Suppl 2, 1993, S. S42–S5.
- Hans Hoffmeister, Bärbel-Maria Bellach: Die Gesundheit der Deutschen. Zusammenhänge zwischen Gesundheit und Lebensstil, Umwelt und soziodemografischen Faktoren : eine Auswertung von Surveydaten. (= RKI-Hefte. 15). Robert-Koch-Institut, Berlin 1996, ISBN 3-89606-016-3.
- Thomas Nicolai, Bärbel Bellach, Erika Mutius, W. Thefeld, H. Hoffmeister: Increased prevalence of sensitization against aeroallergens in adults in West compared to East Germany. In: Clinical and experimental allergy : Journal of the British Society for Allergy and Clinical Immunology. Band 27, 1997, S. 886–892. doi:10.1111/j.1365-2222.1997.tb01228.x.
- Bärbel Bellach, Hildtraud Knopf, W. Thefeld: Der Bundes-Gesundheitssurvey 1997/1998. In: Gesundheitswesen. Band 60, 1998, S. 59–68.
- Bärbel Bellach: Leitlinien und Empfehlungen zur Sicherung von Guter Epidemiologischer Praxis (GEP). In: Bundesgesundheitsblatt – Gesundheitsforschung – Gesundheitsschutz. Band 43, 2000, S. 468–475. doi:10.1007/s001030070056.
- B.-M. Kurth (Hrsg.): Monitoring der gesundheitlichen Versorgung in Deutschland : Konzepte, Anforderungen, Datenquellen. Deutscher Ärzte-Verlag, Köln 2008, ISBN 978-3-7691-3324-0.
- Bärbel-Maria Kurth: DEGS – Studie zur Gesundheit Erwachsener in Deutschland : Projektbeschreibung. (= Beiträge zur Gesundheitsberichterstattung des Bundes). Robert-Koch-Institut, Berlin 2009, ISBN 978-3-89606-199-7.
- Bärbel-Maria Kurth: Das RKI-Gesundheitsmonitoring – was es enthält und wie es genutzt werden kann. In: Public Health Forum: Forschung – Lehre – Praxis. Public Health Forum. Band 20, Heft 3, 2012. ISSN 0944-5587. doi:10.1016/j.phf.2012.06.001
