= Transport ecology =

Transport ecology is the science of the human-transport-environment system. There are two chairs of transport ecology in Germany, in Dresden and Karlsruhe.

== Vocabulary ==
Mobility is about satisfying the need to travel. To achieve mobility, means of transport are needed. Mobility corresponds to the human need to travel - recognised by article 13 of the Universal Declaration of Human Rights - while transport is a means of achieving mobility.

In public debate, mobility is often confused with transport. The "Dresden Declaration" calls for people's mobility needs to be met in a cost-effective and environmental-friendly way · .

== Suggested measures ==
Then the proposed measures (whether they involve transport modes, the concept of "traffic avoidance, change of transport mode, technical improvements", the tautology of transport ecology or the "4 E", i.e. Enforcement, Education, Engineering, Economy/Encouragement) are scrutinised for transparency, fairness (polluters pay), unwanted side-effects and the application of the measure ("are there other examples of application elsewhere? ").

=== Traffic avoidance, modal shift and finally technical improvements ===
The concept of « traffic avoidance, modal shift and technical improvements » involves firstly reducing the volume of transport, then promoting intermodality and finally making technical improvements to vehicles and making the energy they consume sustainable.

This means in fact implementing the Kaya identity applied to transport (see below).

=== Enforcement, Education, Engineering, Economy/Encouragement ===
These methods are also known as "4E". Enforcement refers to measures of order, whether obligations or prohibitions. Education refers to training, communication. Engineering is of a purely technical nature, whereas Economy/Encouragement re incentive systems, which may well be financial.

=== Tautology of transport ecology ===
As long as pollution is proportional to the distance travelled, Udo Becker defines tautology of transport ecology (in German « verkehrsökologische Tautologie ») as follows :

$$pollution  = D \times \frac {C} {D} \times \frac {pollution} {C}$$

with :

- $pollution$ : pollution;
- $D$ : Transportation demand (in passenger-km);
- $C$ : vehicle traffic (in vehicle-km) :
- $\frac {C} {D}$ : inverse of vehicle occupancy (in vehicle-km per passenger-km) ;
- $\frac {pollution} {C}$ is pollution per vehicle-km.

Demand can be decomposed according to:

$$D= Population \times \frac {journey} {Population} \times \frac {distance} {journey}$$

with :

- $Population$ : population;
- $\frac {journey} {Population}$ : number of journeys per person;
- $\frac {distance} {journey}$ : mean distance of a journey.

Pollution can therefore be expressed as the sum of pollution according to the modes of transport :

$$pollution  = D \times \sum \frac {D_i} {D} \times \frac {C_i} {D_i} \times \frac {pollution_i} {C_i}$$

with :

- $\frac {D_i} {D}$ : Modal shift (dimensionless quantity);
- $\frac {C_i} {D_i}$ : inverse of occupancy according to the mode of transport (in vehicle-km per passenger-km) ;
- $\frac {pollution_i} {C_i}$ is the pollution per vehicle-km according to the mode of transport.

==== Kaya identity applied to transport ====
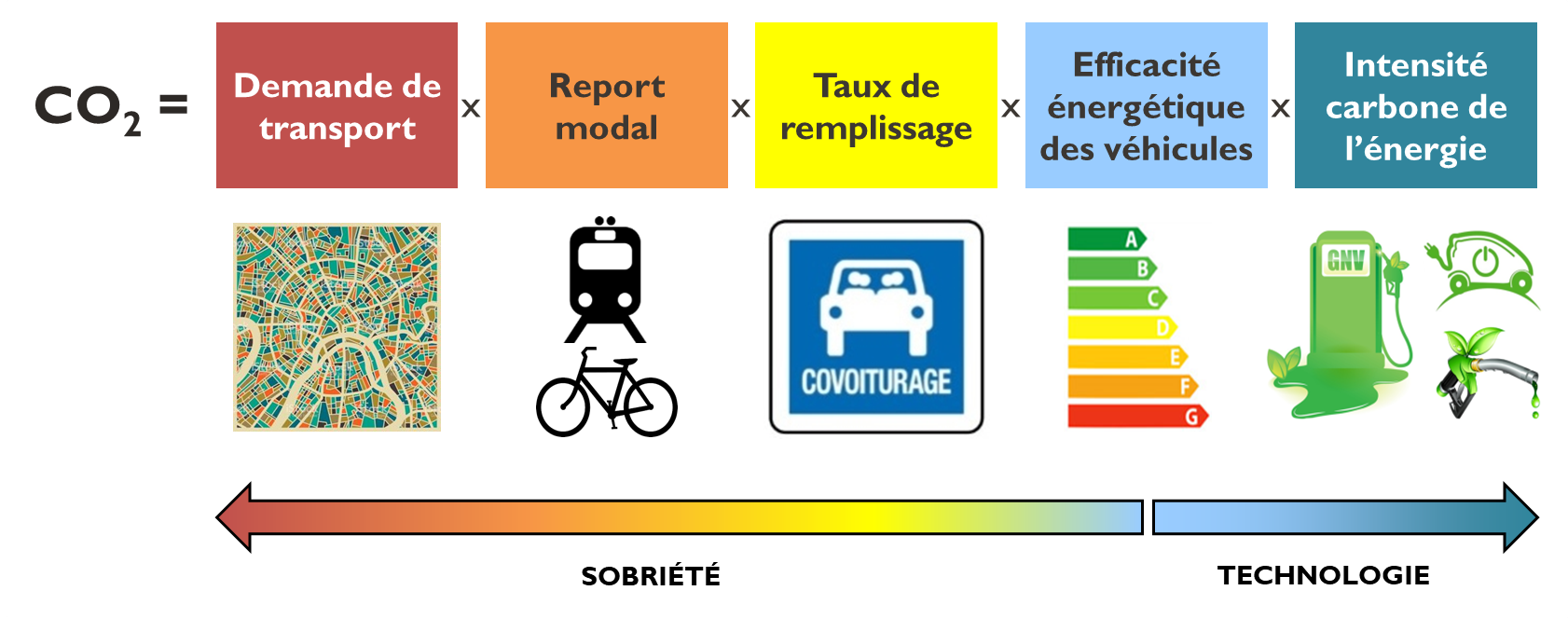
Breakdown (according to the log-mean Divisia index -LMDI- method) of carbon dioxide emissions from transport into five factors. The first four factors correspond to energy savings, while the last factor corresponds to the carbon intensity of energy. The decline in transport demand is a matter of sufficiency. Energy efficiency is a matter of technical progress. Translation : transport demand, modal split, occupancy, energy efficiency, carbon intensity of energy, then sufficiency and technical progress.

The general formulation takes on a more specific form when it comes to decarbonising transport, following Kaya identity.

Pollution being identified to CO_{2} $\frac {pollution_i} {C_i}$ is replaced by $\frac {{CO_2}_i} {E_i} \times \frac {E_i} {C_i}$
with :

- $\frac {E_i} {C_i}$ : inverse of efficiency according to the mode of transport (for instance in kWh/100 km per vehicle);
- $\frac {{CO_2}_i} {E_i}$ : carbon intensity of the energy according to the mode of transport (for instance in g CO_{2} equivalent/kWh).

CO2 emissions can be decomposed according:

$$CO_2  = D \times \sum \frac {D_i} {D} \times \frac {C_i} {D_i} \times \frac {E_i} {C_i} \times \frac {{CO_2}_i} {E_i}$$

== See also ==
- Green transport hierarchy
- Health and environmental impact of transport
