= Iris Pigeot =

German biostatistician

Iris Pigeot-Kübler (born 1960) is a German biostatistician, biometrician, and epidemiologist. She is the director of the Leibniz Institute for Prevention Research and Epidemiology in Bremen, and the president-elect of the International Biometric Society.

== Education and career ==
Pigeot was born in 1960, in Wanne-Eickel, a town in northwestern Germany that in 1975 became incorporated into Herne, North Rhine-Westphalia. She earned a diploma in statistics and sociology at the Technical University of Dortmund in 1985. She completed her Ph.D. there in 1989, with the dissertation Schätzer des gemeinsamen Odds Ratios in geschichteten Kontingenztafeln [Estimator of the joint odds ratio in stratified contingency tables] supervised by Ursula Gather. She received a habilitation in 1993.

She became an assistant professor at the Technical University of Dortmund, and then in 1995 a professor at LMU Munich. In 2001, Pigeot joined the Bremen Institute for Prevention Research and Social Medicine (BIPS, now the Leibniz Institute for Prevention Research and Epidemiology), at the same time taking a professorship at the University of Bremen, which controlled part of the institute. At the Leibniz Institute, she became head of the Department of Biometry and Data Management. In 2004, she became director of the institute. In 2007, under her directorship, the separated parts of the institute were rejoined, and in 2012 it spun off from the university to become a separate non-profit institution within the Leibniz Association.

Pigeot was elected to the presidency of the International Biometric Society in 2022, for the 2024 term.

== Recognition ==
Pigeot was the 2010 recipient of the Susanne Dahms Medal of the International Biometric Society (German Region). In 2020, she was given the Great Medal of the University of Rzeszów in Poland.
