= Black gum =

Black gum may refer to several species of plants:

- Nyssa sylvatica, a tree native to eastern North America
- Eucalyptus aggregata, a tree that grows in south eastern Australia
- Eucalyptus ovata, a tree that grows in south eastern Australia
