= Avoid-Shift-Improve =

Approach to environmental sustainability by changing consumer behavior

Avoid-Shift-Improve (A-S-I) (German: vermeiden, verlagern, verbessern) is an approach to environmental sustainability that seeks to increase efficiency by modifying consumer behavior. Though it originated in transportation studies, it has since been used to apply to other ways that consumers use natural resources.

== History ==
Avoid-Shift-Improve (A-S-I) was first developed in Germany in the early 1990s as vermeiden, verlagern, verbessern. The term was first published in a 1994 report by the German Parliament's Enquete Commission.

== Method ==
As denoted by the name, Avoid-Shift-Improve has three avenues. It seeks to modify the behavior of consumers rather than producers to make consumer choices more environmentally sustainable.

- Avoid, also called reduce: The consumer chooses to use none of or less of a resource.
- Shift, also called maintain: The consumer switches from a less sustainable method of consumption to a more sustainable one. If the more sustainable option is already in use, the consumer maintains its use.
- Improve: The consumer increases the resource efficiency of an existing good or service.

In the context of transportation efficiency, "Avoid" could mean consolidating or eliminating vehicle trips; "Shift" could include using a bicycle instead of an automobile; and "Improve" could include trading in a gas-powered personal vehicle for a hybrid or electric one. The three routes are considered hierarchical, with avoiding consumption the most impactful, and thus, most important priority.

== Application ==
Though developed for use in transportation, A-S-I has been applied to other consumer sectors, including food, homes, and energy. Technological and entrepreneurial developments can create more A-S-I opportunities, such as smart thermostats that raise and lower interior temperatures based on human occupancy and activity patterns, or meal kits that can reduce food waste by sending pre-apportioned ingredients.

== See also ==
- Transport ecology
- Waste hierarchy
- Net zero emissions
