= Leibniz Institute for Prevention Research and Epidemiology – BIPS =

German epidemiology institute

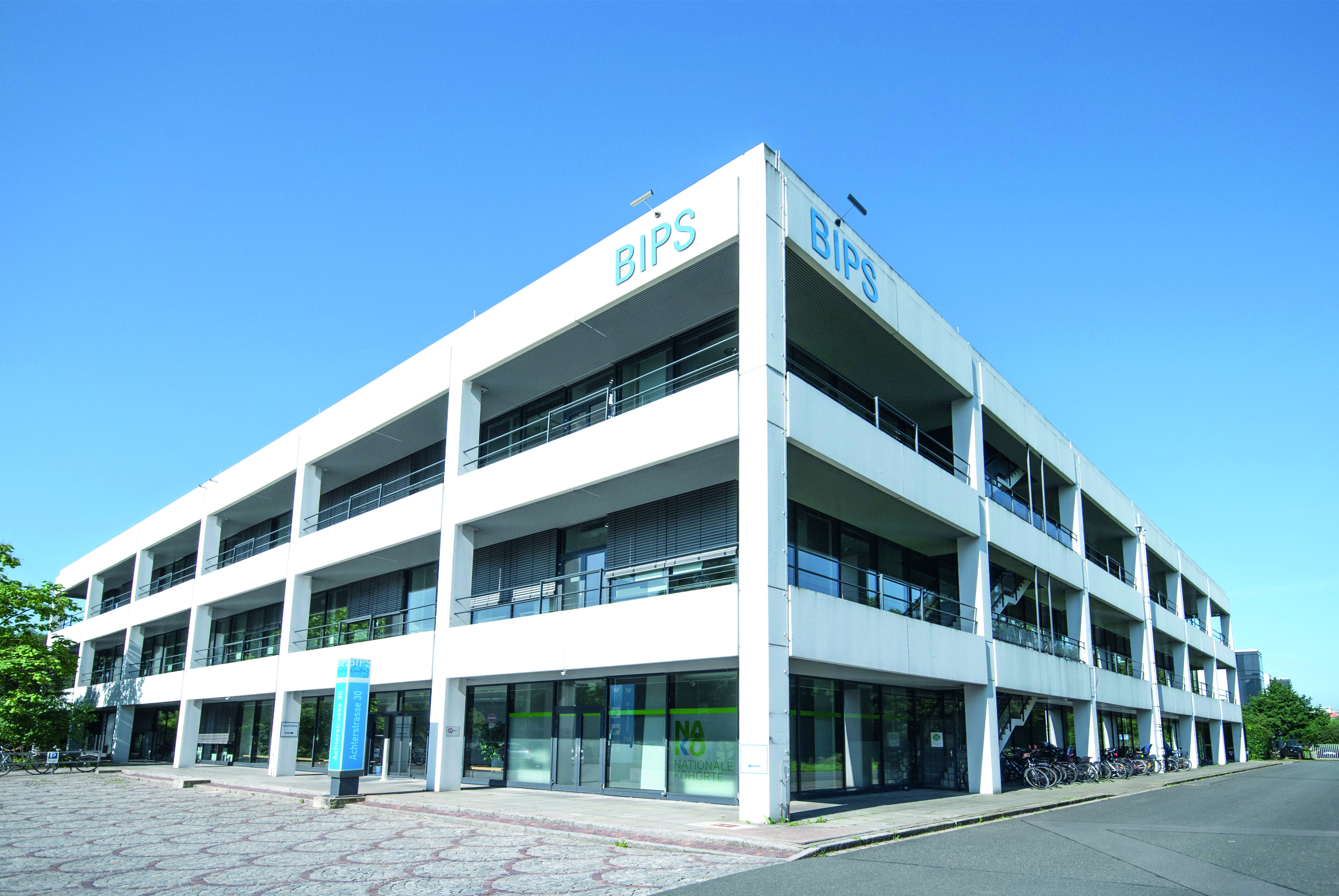
Building of the Leibniz Institute for Prevention Research and Epidemiology – BIPS

The Leibniz Institute for Prevention Research and Epidemiology – BIPS GmbH (formerly: Bremer Institute for Prevention Research and Social Medicine (BIPS)) is an independent, interdisciplinary epidemiology research institute based in Bremen, Germany. The institute conducts research on the causes of disease and prevention strategies. In addition to research activities, its responsibilities include the translation of findings into practice and academic teaching. Since 1 January 2013, BIPS has been a member of the Leibniz Association.

== History ==
BIPS was founded on 1 January 1981 as a legally dependent research institute under the Association for the Promotion of Scientific Research in the Free Hanseatic City of Bremen. The founding director was pharmacologist Eberhard Greiser. Initially located at Präsident-Kennedy-Platz in Bremen, the institute later moved to several locations, including Bremen-Mitte Clinic and Grüne Straße in Bremen Neustadt.

Later, BIPS moved its headquarters to the Bremen-Mitte Clinic and then to Grüne Straße in Bremen Neustadt. Since April 1, 1998, BIPS has been responsible for maintaining the registry of the Bremen Epidemiological Cancer Registry. In 2000, it finally moved to Linzer Straße in the Bremen Technology Park next to the University of Bremen. Greiser retired in 2003 and was succeeded by Iris Pigeot in 2004, who had been head of the Statistics Department.

On 1 January 2007, BIPS became a central scientific institution of the University of Bremen. In 2012, it was spun off as a limited liability company and adopted its current name. BIPS became a full member of the Leibniz Association in 2013.

== Structure ==
BIPS is structured into six departments: Epidemiological Methods and Etiological Research; Prevention and Evaluation; Clinical Epidemiology; Research Data Infrastructures and Data Science; Statistical Methods in Epidemiology and Administration. The management team includes Director Iris Pigeot and Administrative Managers Frauke Günther and Norman Wirsik. The institute has a scientific advisory board and an institute council. Its sole shareholder is the Association for the Promotion of Scientific Research in the Free Hanseatic City of Bremen.

== Research ==
BIPS conducts studies across a range of public health and epidemiological topics, from identifying risk factors to evaluating and implementing prevention programs. Its research areas include:

- Epidemiology of work-related diseases
- Women's and gender studies
- Genetic epidemiology and bioinformatics
- Health reporting
- Clinical epidemiology
- Cancer epidemiology (including the Bremen Cancer Registry)
- Methodological research
- Pharmacoepidemiology
- Prevention and health promotion
- Environmental epidemiology

BIPS coordinates the Bremen site of the NAKO Health Study (Nationale Kohorte), a long-term population study investigating causes of major chronic diseases.

In 2016, researchers at BIPS analyzed health disparities in Bremen, identifying significant differences in life expectancy based on socio-economic status and residential area. The findings were presented in cooperation with local social organizations.

Since 2017, BIPS has been designated a WHO Collaborating Centre for evidence-based public health promotion. The institute also contributes to international research on health inequalities and child health, notably through its role in the IDEFICS/I.Family studies. The Europe-wide cohort involving over 16,000 children revealed stark social inequalities in child health. The study showed that children from low-income and less-educated families were significantly more likely to be overweight, physically inactive, and poorly nourished.

BIPS is part of the Leibniz ScienceCampus Digital Public Health in Bremen, established in 2019. The campus explores digital innovations in health promotion and prevention, involving multiple academic disciplines. Since 2024 the institute hosts a podcast on the topic.

During the COVID-19 pandemic, BIPS researchers contributed to science communication and policy advice in Germany. Since 2024, Director Iris Pigeot has been a member of the German Expert Council on Health and Resilience. In 2024, BIPS launched the citizen science project "Guardians of the Hedgehog", addressing One Health issues by linking biodiversity, environmental factors, and public health.

The German Pharmacoepidemiological Research Database (GePaRD) is run by BIPS. It is one of the largest claims database, covering around 25 million individuals in Germany. It supports research on drug and vaccine use and safety in routine care and has been used in over 100 studies, including on pregnant women.

The BIPS BioBank is a biosample repository managed by the Institute. It supports biomarker-based research across the lifespan and contains around 800,000 biosamples from over 35,000 participants. The biobank includes blood, urine, saliva, and tissue samples from various epidemiological studies and enables research on chronic diseases such as obesity, diabetes, and metabolic syndrome. It adheres to FAIR data principles.
