= NAKO Health Study =

Cohort study with 200,000 participants in Germany

The NAKO Health Study (German: NAKO Gesundheitsstudie) is a large-scale, population-based cohort study conducted in Germany. Its purpose is to investigate the development, distribution, and risk factors of chronic diseases among a representative sample of adults. Approximately 200,000 participants, aged between 20 and 69 years at enrollment, were recruited between 2014 and 2018. The study is designed to follow participants for a period of at least 20 to 30 years.

== Research focus ==
The study examines a range of chronic health conditions, including cardiovascular diseases, cancer, diabetes mellitus, neurological and psychiatric disorders, respiratory diseases, infectious diseases, and musculoskeletal conditions. Data collected allow researchers to analyze the interaction of genetic, environmental, lifestyle, and social factors in relation to health outcomes. The study aims to provide evidence that may inform prevention strategies, early detection, and healthcare interventions.

== Organization and funding ==
Preparatory work for the study began in 2009, with the study protocol being submitted to the German Federal Ministry of Education and Research (BMBF) in 2011. The protocol underwent review by an international scientific panel prior to funding approval.

NAKO is carried out by a consortium of German research organizations, including members of the Helmholtz Association, various German universities, the Leibniz Association, and other scientific institutions. A total of 25 institutions across Germany are involved. Initial funding for the first ten years totaled approximately €210 million, provided by the BMBF, the federal states (Bundesländer), and the Helmholtz Association. Participating institutions contribute further resources.

The coordinating body of the study, NAKO e.V., was established in 2013 and is headquartered in Heidelberg.

== Study design ==
The study operates through 18 regional study centers distributed across Germany. In most regions, 10,000 individuals were randomly selected from local population registries and invited to participate; two centers (Augsburg and Neubrandenburg) invited 20,000 individuals each.

- Baseline recruitment (2014–2018): ~205,000 participants
- First follow-up phase (2018–2024): ~135,000 participants
- Third follow-up phase (since May 2024): ongoing

Participants undergo examinations in two tiers:

=== Level 1 (applied to all participants, ~3–4 hours) ===
- Lifestyle, medical history, medication use
- Cognitive tests (attention, concentration, memory)
- Anthropometric measurements (height, weight, waist circumference, body composition)
- Grip strength
- Blood pressure and cardiovascular function
- Lung function (spirometry)
- Dental health assessment

=== Level 2 (applied to ~20% of participants, ~5 hours) ===
- Extended metabolic testing (oral glucose tolerance test, glycation in skin)
- Echocardiography (3D), ECG (resting and long-term), sleep monitoring
- Ultrasound of abdominal fat
- Musculoskeletal examinations (mobility tests of hands, knees, hips)
- Eye, hearing, and smell tests
- Additional biomarker assessments

== Follow-up and data collection ==
Participants are surveyed at regular intervals (every 2–3 years), and health events during follow-up are linked with baseline data to study the development of diseases and identify associated risk factors. Full physical re-examinations are scheduled approximately every 4–5 years.

The study includes a large biosample collection of approximately 28 million biological specimens, including blood, urine, saliva, stool, and nasal swabs. The central biobank is located at Helmholtz Zentrum München, with additional samples stored at participating centers such as the BIPS Biobank in Bremen.

== Results ==
Since the beginning of data collection, numerous scientific analyses and publications have been based on the NAKO Health Study. Early results indicated that approximately 15% of the first 100,000 participants reported a lifetime diagnosis of depression. Additional analyses identified associations between nighttime traffic noise and health risks such as sleep disturbances, hypertension, and psychological strain.

Magnetic resonance imaging (MRI) data from NAKO have been used to address further research questions. These include analyses of muscle and fat distribution for artificial intelligence-based estimation of biological age and mortality risk. A large-scale MRI analysis involving over 30,000 participants revealed that higher levels of intermuscular fat were associated with chronic back pain, while greater muscle mass showed a protective effect.

Further studies utilized NAKO data to investigate the relationship between biodiversity and mental health. A study published in The Lancet Planetary Health demonstrated that greater bird species diversity was positively associated with mental health, particularly among individuals with lower socioeconomic status.

In addition, extensive dental examinations were conducted within NAKO. Initial results on dental status, periodontal diseases, and functional parameters have been published in a comprehensive methodological report.
