= Caucus for Women in Statistics and Data Science =

Professional society

The Caucus for Women in Statistics and Data Science (CWS) is a professional society for women in statistics, data science and related fields. It was founded in 1971, following discussions in 1969 and 1970 at the annual meetings of the American Statistical Association, with Donna Brogan as its first president. The Governing Council is the main governing body of CWS. The Council consists of the President, President-Elect, Past President, Past Past President, Executive Director (ex-officio), Treasurer, Secretary, Membership Chair, Program Committee Chair, Communications Committee Chair, Professional Development Committee Chair, Chair of Liaisons with other organizations and the Chair of Country Representatives. The President-Elect, President, Past President, Secretary, Treasurer and Executive Director constitute the Executive Committee of the Governing Council. CWS governance is described in the Constitution and Bylaws.

== Purpose ==
The purpose of the CWS is to assist in teaching, hiring, and advancing the careers of women in statistics, removing barriers to women in statistics, encourage the application of statistics to women's issues, and improve the representation of women in professional organizations for statisticians. CWS envisions a world where women in the profession of statistics have equal opportunity and access to influence policies and decisions in workplaces, governments, and communities. The organization's mission is to advance the careers of women statisticians through advocacy, providing resources and learning opportunities, increasing their professional participation and visibility, and promoting and assessing research that impacts women statisticians.

== Related organizations ==
CWS is an independent society that works with other statistical professional societies, including the American Statistical Association (ASA), the Institute of Mathematical Statistics (IMS), Statistical Society of Canada (SSC), and International Statistical Institute (ISI). CWS has a close tie with the ASA and participates in the Joint Statistical Meetings (JSM) which are run by the ASA and cosponsored by IMS, SSC and other professional societies, where it is a sponsor of the Gertrude M. Cox Scholarship. The Caucus is a "sister organization" to the Association for Women in Mathematics, which was founded at the same time as CWS.

== Activities ==
The Caucus has a regular email blast and organizes events at major statistical meetings. Since 2001, its activities have also included jointly sponsoring the Florence Nightingale David Award with the Committee of Presidents of Statistical Societies. This is "the only international award in statistical sciences ... that is restricted to women". CWS hosts its own conference every year on the second Tuesday of October, celebrating International Day of Women in Statistics and Data Science (IDWSDS - idwsds.org).

== Leadership ==
The presidents of the Caucus have included:

- 1971–1973: Donna Brogan
- 1974–1975: Marie Wann
- 1976: Joan R. Rosenblatt
- 1977: Barbara A. Bailar
- 1978: Janet L. Norwood
- 1979: Irene Montie
- 1980: Shirley Kallek
- 1981: Beatrice N. Vaccara
- 1982: Eileen Boardman
- 1983: Lee-Ann C. Hayek
- 1984: Jane F. Gentleman
- 1985: Nancy Gordon
- 1986: Arlene Ash
- 1987: Sandra K. McKenzie
- 1988: Jessica Utts
- 1989: Cynthia Clark
- 1990: Sue Leurgans
- 1991: Cyntha Struthers
- 1992: Stephanie Shipp
- 1993: Barbara Tilley
- 1994: Juliet Popper Shaffer
- 1995: Mary Batcher
- 1996: Pamela Doctor
- 1997: Sandra Stinnett
- 1998: Elizabeth Margosches
- 1999: Holly Shulman
- 2000: Janet Williams
- 2001: Nancy Allen
- 2002: Mari Palta
- 2003: Martha Aliaga
- 2004: Mariza de Andrade
- 2005: Julia Bienias
- 2006: Mary W. Gray
- 2007: Tena Katsaounis
- 2008–2009: Marcia Ciol
- 2010: Jennifer D. Parker
- 2011: Amanda L. Golbeck
- 2012: J. Lynn Palmer
- 2013: Susmita Datta
- 2014: Nancy Flournoy
- 2015: Paula Roberson
- 2016: Jiayang Sun
- 2017: Ji-Hyun Lee
- 2018: Shili Lin
- 2019: Nicole Lazar
- 2020: Wendy Lou
- 2021: Motomi Mori
- 2022: Nairanjana Dasgupta
- 2023: Dong-Yun Kim
- 2024: Cynthia Bland
- 2025: Umut Ozbek
- 2026: Suhwon Lee
