= Arlene Ash =

American statistician

Arlene Sandra Ash is an American statistician who works on risk adjustment in health services. She is a professor of Quantitative Health Sciences in the University of Massachusetts Medical School, and chief of the Biostatistics and Health Services Research division there.

Ash did her undergraduate studies in mathematics at Harvard College. She earned a master's degree in mathematics from Washington University in St. Louis, and a PhD in statistics from the University of Illinois at Chicago. Ash taught mathematics in the Peace Corps in the 1960s, helped start two feminist health centers in Chicago in the 1970s, and founded a company, DxCG Inc., to apply her risk adjustment models. Since 1978, she has been involved as an expert witness in public policy issues, including the environmental impact of a nuclear power plant and equity in pay for women teachers. Before joining the University of Massachusetts she taught at Boston University.

Beyond health, Ash is also interested in electoral integrity, and has chaired the American Statistical Association Subcommittee on Electoral Integrity. She has also been involved in the anti-nuclear movement and has worked for equal pay for women.

She was President of the Caucus for Women in Statistics in 1986. She became a fellow of the American Statistical Association in 1998 and is an elected member of the International Statistical Institute. In 2010 she won the Long-Term Excellence Award of the American Statistical Association Section on Health Policy Statistics.
