= Jennifer D. Parker =

American statistician

Jennifer D. Parker is an American statistician who works as the Director of the Division of Research and Methodology at the National Center for Health Statistics. Her publications include highly-cited works relating socioeconomic status, air pollution, and birth weight of infants.

== Education and career ==
Parker completed her Ph.D. in biostatistics at the University of California, Berkeley, and did postdoctoral research at the University of California, San Francisco.

As well as her position at the National Center for Health Statistics, Parker holds a position as adjunct research professor in the Department of Applied Environmental Health of the University of Maryland School of Public Health.

== Recognition ==
Parker served as the president of the Caucus for Women in Statistics in 2010. In 2017, she was elected as a Fellow of the American Statistical Association.

== Selected publications ==
- Parker, J. D.; Abrams, B. (May 1992), "Prenatal weight gain advice: an examination of the recent prenatal weight gain recommendations of the Institute of Medicine", Obstetrics and Gynecology, 79 (5): 664–669, PMID 1565346
- Parker, J.D.; Schoendorf, K. C.; Kiely, J. L. (July 1994), "Associations between measures of socioeconomic status and low birth weight, small for gestational age, and premature delivery in the United States", Annals of Epidemiology, 4 (4): 271–278, doi:10.1016/1047-2797(94)90082-5, PMID 7921316
- Ingram, D. D.; Parker, J. D.; Schenker, N.; Weed, J. A.; Hamilton, B.; Arias, E.; Madans, J. H. (September 2003), "United States Census 2000 population with bridged race categories", Vital and Health Statistics, Series 2 (135): 1–55, PMID 14556588
- Parker, J. D.; Woodruff, T. J.; Basu, R.; Schoendorf, K. C. (January 2005), "Air pollution and birth weight among term infants in California", Pediatrics, 115 (1): 121–128, doi:10.1542/peds.2004-0889, PMID 15629991, S2CID 28645356
- Woodruff, T. J.; Parker, J. D.; Darrow, L. A.; Slama, R.; Bell, M. L.; Choi, H.; Glinianaia, S.; Hoggatt, K. J.; Karr, C. J.; Lobdell, D. T.; Wilhelm, M. (April 2009), "Methodological issues in studies of air pollution and reproductive health", Environmental Research, 109 (3): 311–320, Bibcode:2009ER....109..311W, doi:10.1016/j.envres.2008.12.012, PMC 6615486, PMID 19215915
