= Irene Montie =

American statistician (1921–2018)

President of the Caucus for Women in Statistics
- In office 1979
- Preceded by: Janet L. Norwood
- Succeeded by: Shirley Kallek

Personal details
- Born: December 12, 1921 Tannersville, New York, U.S.
- Died: December 23, 2018 (aged 97)
- Parent(s): Michael Edward Curran; Catherine Keogh Curran
- Education: Upper Iowa University; New York University; University of Northern Colorado; Central Michigan University; Walden University (PhD)
- Profession: Statistician

Irene Curran Montie (December 12, 1921 – December 23, 2018) was an American statistician in the US government service who became president of the Caucus for Women in Statistics.

== Early life and education ==
Montie was born in Tannersville, New York; her parents, Michael Edward Curran and Catherine Keogh Curran, were of Irish descent. She earned two associate degrees, two bachelor's degrees (from Upper Iowa University in 1973 and New York University in 1974), two master's degrees (from the University of Northern Colorado in 1974 and Central Michigan University in 1976), and a Ph.D., which she completed in 1976 at Walden University. Her dissertation was Application of Change Theory for Alleviation of Prejudicial Barriers to Career Advancement for Women: A Study in Two Federal Agencies, and was supervised by Harry Kranz.

== Career ==
Before joining the United States Census Bureau, Montie founded a childcare firm. From 1969 to 1978 she was chief of the Sampling Procedures Branch of the Census Bureau. In the early 1980s she was director of the Survey and Statistical Design Division in the Office of Energy Systems and Support, United States Department of Energy. Afterwards, she also worked in the Office of Management and Budget.

== Service ==
Montie became president of the Caucus for Women in Statistics for the 1979 term. She also served on the Information Resources Management Curriculum Advisory Committee of Graduate School USA.
