= Julia Bienias =

American biostatistician

Julia Louise Bienias is an American biostatistician known for her highly-cited publications on Alzheimer's disease.

== Education and career ==
Bienias completed her Ph.D. in 1993 at the Harvard School of Public Health. Her dissertation was Design and Analysis of Time-to-Pregnancy Studies, and was supervised by Louise M. Ryan. She has worked for the United States Census Bureau, for the Rush University Medical Center, and for the Nielsen Corporation.

== Recognition ==
Bienias was president of the Caucus for Women in Statistics for the 2005 term. She is an Elected Member of the International Statistical Institute, and was named a Fellow of the American Statistical Association in 2021.

== Selected publications ==
- Wilson, Robert S. (February 2002), "Participation in Cognitively Stimulating Activities and Risk of Incident Alzheimer Disease", Journal of the American Medical Association, 287 (6): 742–8, doi:10.1001/jama.287.6.742, PMID 11851541
- Morris, Martha Clare; Evans, Denis A.; Bienias, Julia L.; Tangney, Christine C.; Bennett, David A.; Wilson, Robert S.; Aggarwal, Neelum; Schneider, Julie (July 2003), "Consumption of Fish and n-3 Fatty Acids and Risk of Incident Alzheimer Disease", Archives of Neurology, 60 (7): 940–6, doi:10.1001/archneur.60.7.940, PMID 12873849
- Hebert, Liesi E.; Scherr, Paul A.; Bienias, Julia L.; Bennett, David A.; Evans, Denis A. (August 2003), "Alzheimer Disease in the US Population", Archives of Neurology, 60 (8): 1119–22, doi:10.1001/archneur.60.8.1119, PMID 12925369
- Bienias, Julia L.; Beckett, Laurel A.; Bennett, David A.; Wilson, Robert S.; Evans, Denis A. (November 2003), "Design of the Chicago Health and Aging Project (CHAP)", Journal of Alzheimer's Disease, 5 (5): 349–355, doi:10.3233/JAD-2003-5501, PMID 14646025
- Arvanitakis, Zoe; Wilson, Robert S.; Bienias, Julia L.; Evans, Denis A.; Bennett, David A. (May 2004), "Diabetes Mellitus and Risk of Alzheimer Disease and Decline in Cognitive Function", Archives of Neurology, 61 (5): 661–6, doi:10.1001/archneur.61.5.661, PMID 15148141
