= Barbara Tilley =

American biostatistician

Barbara C. Tilley is an American biostatistician.

== Early life ==
Tilley was born in San Rafael, California.

== Education ==
Tilley graduated from California State University, Northridge in 1972. She earned a master's degree in biomathematics at the University of Washington in 1975, and completed her Ph.D. at the University of Texas School of Public Health in 1981.

== Career ==
Tilley became an adjunct faculty member at the University of Michigan in 1984, and worked at the Henry Ford Health System in Detroit, Michigan, from 1983 to 1999. She became a professor at Case Western Reserve University in 1998, and in 1999, moved to the Medical University of South Carolina as chair of the Department of Biostatistics, Bioinformatics and Epidemiology. She returned to the University of Texas School of Public Health in 2009, as Lorne D. Bain Distinguished Professor and head of the Division of Biostatistics. She is a Distinguished University Professor Emeritus at the Medical University of South Carolina.

== Recognition ==
In 1992, Tilley was elected as a Fellow of the American Statistical Association. She became a fellow of the Society for Clinical Trials in 2012.

Tilley was president of the Statistics Section of the American Public Health Association in 1991, and president of the Caucus for Women in Statistics for the 1993 term.
