= Marie Wann =

American statistician and author (1911–1996)

Marie Di Mario Wann (1911–1996) was an American statistician and author. She wrote a book about her experiences in post-war Germany, worked as a statistician for several US government agencies, helped found the Committee on Women in Statistics of the American Statistical Association, and led the Caucus for Women in Statistics.

== Education and career ==
Wann graduated from Hunter College in 1931, and earned a master's degree from Columbia University in 1934. She completed a Ph.D. in educational research at Columbia University in 1943. Her dissertation was A Study of Fact and Attitude About Gonorrhea as Demonstrated by Questionnaire Study.

Wann was chief of the Response Errors Studies Branch in the Statistical Methods Division of the United States Census Bureau before moving to the Statistical Research Division in 1963 as a research editor. In 1964 she was appointed as chief of the Branch of Planning and Programs in the Division of Statistics in the United States Bureau of Mines. In 1967 she became chief statistician of the Bureau of Indian Affairs. Later in the same year she moved to the Office of Statistical Standards of the Bureau of the Budget.

== Service and personal life ==
Wann was the author of the book Dependent Baggage—Destination Germany (Macmillan, 1955), describing her travels to Germany as the wife of the American Director of Education and Cultural Affairs in Allied-occupied Germany. Her husband, Harry Arthur Wann, died in 1965; they had married in 1942 and had two daughters.

Wann became a founding member of the Committee on Women in Statistics of the American Statistical Association, founded in 1972, and she served as the second president of the Caucus for Women in Statistics, following Donna Brogan, in 1974 and 1975. In 1981 she became the founding chair of the Council of Professional Associations on Federal Statistics.

== Recognition ==
In 1974, Wann was elected as a Fellow of the American Statistical Association.
