= Sandra Stinnett =

American statistician

- Citizenship: American

Academic background
- Education: University of Houston; University of Texas School of Public Health
- Alma mater: University of North Carolina School of Public Health
- Thesis: Collinearity in Mixed Models (1993)
- Doctoral advisor: Ronald W. Helms

Academic work
- Discipline: Statistics
- Sub-discipline: Biostatistics
- Institutions: Duke University School of Medicine
- Main interests: Ophthalmology

Sandra Sue Stinnett is an American statistician specializing in the biostatistics of ophthalmology. She is an associate professor in the departments of biostatistics and bioinformatics and of ophthalmology in the Duke University School of Medicine.

== Education and career ==
Stinnett majored in psychology at the University of Houston. After graduating in 1970, she began taking mathematics courses at the university (a topic not covered in her degree program) in order to improve her employment prospects. At the same time, she began learning the Spanish language.

In 1973, she began a master's program in biometry at the University of Texas School of Public Health. Her research in the program involved traveling to Panama to study the blood pressure of Afro-Panamanian people. She earned a master's degree in 1977, with a thesis on Regression to the mean in sequential measurement of blood pressure. Afterwards she stayed at the school as an epidemiologist. In 1981, Stinnett moved to North Carolina, and in 1982 she entered the doctoral program in biostatistics at the University of North Carolina School of Public Health. After time away from the program doing statistical consulting for Quintiles and Rho, and studying Spanish in Spain, she completed her doctorate in 1993. Her dissertation was Collinearity in Mixed Models, and was advised by Ronald W. Helms.

She joined Duke University in 1994, as an assistant research professor of community and family medicine, and became the director of statistical operations at the Duke Clinical Research Institute. She moved from community and family medicine to biostatistics and bioinformatics in 2000, and added an affiliation in the department of ophthalmology in 2001. She shifted from her research faculty position to being a regular-rank faculty member in 2007, and was promoted to associate professor in 2014.

== Service ==
Stinnett was president of the Caucus for Women in Statistics for the 1997 term. She has also chaired the Committee on Women in Statistics and the Section on Statistical Consulting of the American Statistical Association.
