= J. Lynn Palmer =

American biostatistician

J. Lynn Palmer is an American biostatistician known for her research on missing data and on treatment of cancer.

== Education and career ==
Palmer studied sociology as an undergraduate at Oklahoma State University, earned a bachelor's degree there in 1976, and stayed on for a master's degree in 1978. After being inspired by the statistics classes she took in her graduate program, she earned a second master's degree at Oklahoma State in statistics in 1980. She completed her Ph.D. in biometry in 1988, at the University of Texas School of Public Health.

She worked at the University of Texas MD Anderson Cancer Center for many years, and in 2013 became director of programs for the American Statistical Association.

== Recognition ==
In 2010 Palmer was elected as a Fellow of the American Statistical Association. She became president of the Caucus for Women in Statistics for the 2012 term. She is also an Elected Member of the International Statistical Institute and a Fellow of the Royal Statistical Society.
