= Tena =

Tena may refer to:

- Tena, Cundinamarca, a municipality and town in Cundinamarca, Colombia
- Tena, Ecuador, capital of Ecuador's Napo Province
- Tena (woreda), a district in the Oromia Region of Ethiopia
- Tena Campbell, American judge
- Tena Japundža, Croatian handball player
- Tena Katsaounis, Greek-American statistician
- Tena Lukas, Croatian tennis player
- Tena Negere, an Ethiopian long-distance runner
- Tena Petika, Croatian handball player
- Tena Štivičić, Croatian playwright and screenwriter
- Tanis Diena, an ancient Latvian sacred holiday
- Tena Valley, a valley located at the southern side of the Pyrenees
- José Tena (baseball), Dominican baseball player
- Natalia Tena, an English actress and musician
- Betaf language, a Papuan language

== See also ==
- TENA (disambiguation)
- Tina (given name)
