= Miklós Csörgő =

Hungarian mathematician and statistician

- Born: 12 March 1932 (age 94)
- Scientific career
- Thesis: Some Kolmogorov-Smirnov-Renyi Type Theorems of Probability (1963)
- Doctoral advisor: William A. O'N. Waugh
- Doctoral students: Sándor Csörgő

Miklós Csörgő (born 12 March 1932 in Egerfarmos) is a Hungarian probabilist and statistician known for his contributions to the theory of empirical processes and several other fields.

== Education and career ==
Csörgő obtained a Bachelor's degree in economics in Budapest in 1955. He arrived in Canada in January 1957 as a refugee of the suppressed Hungarian Revolution. After a variety of odd jobs, in 1959 he enrolled at McGill University in Montreal where he earned M.A. and Ph.D. degrees in 1961 and 1963 respectively.

After graduating, he held positions as postdoctoral fellow and lecturer at Princeton University for two years. In 1965 he returned to McGill University to take up a position as assistant professor; he was promoted to associate professor there in 1968. In 1972, he moved to Carleton University in Ottawa as a professor of mathematics and statistics, where he became Distinguished Research Professor after his retirement.

One of his students was his brother, Sándor Csörgő, who was fifteen years his junior.

== Books ==
- Csörgő, M.; Horváth, L. (1997). Limit Theorems in Change-point Analysis. Chichester: Wiley. ISBN 978-0471955221.
- Csörgő, M.; Horváth, L. (1993). Weighted Approximations in Probability and Statistics. Chichester: Wiley. ISBN 978-0471936350.
- Csörgő, M.; Csörgő, S.; Horváth, L. (1986). An Asymptotic Theory for Empirical Reliability and Concentration Processes. Springer Lectures Notes in Statistics. Vol. 33. Berlin, Heidelberg: Springer. ISBN 978-0387963594.
- Csörgő, M. (1983). Quantile Processes with Statistical Applications. CBMS-NSF Regional Conference Series in Applied Mathematics. Vol. 42. Philadelphia: SIAM. ISBN 978-0898711851.
- Csörgő, M.; Révész, P. (1981). Strong Approximations in Probability and Statistics. New York: Academic Press. ISBN 978-0-12-198540-0.
