= Sándor Csörgő =

Hungarian mathematician

- Csörgő Sándor
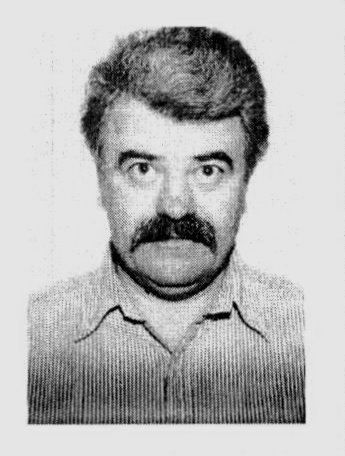
- University of Szeged identity photo
- Born: 16 July 1947; Egerfarmos, Heves County, Hungary
- Died: 14 February 2008 (aged 60); Szeged, Csongrád County, Hungary
- Resting place: Újszeged Cemetery
- Scientific career
- Fields: Mathematics
- Institutions: University of Szeged
- Academic advisors: Béla Szőkefalvi-Nagy; Anatoliy Skorokhod
- Notable students: Wei Biao Wu

Sándor Csörgő (16 July 1947 at Egerfarmos, Heves County – 14 February 2008 at Újszeged, Csongrád County) was a Hungarian mathematician, and a professor at the University of Szeged.

His main fields were probability, mathematical statistics, and asymptotic theory. He did important research on the St. Petersburg paradox.

He was a member of the Hungarian Academy of Sciences.

His brother Miklós Csörgő is also a mathematician.

== Career ==
Csörgő graduated from the István Dobó High School in Eger, Heves County. He did undergraduate studies in the mathematics department at József Attila University (University of Szeged), graduating in 1970, and immediately joined the János Bolyai Mathematical Institute at the University as a graduate student. In 1972, he presented his doctoral thesis to Béla Szőkefalvi-Nagy and Károly Tandori.

From 1972 to 1975 he completed a post-doctoral thesis at Kiev State University under Anatoliy Skorokhod. On its completion in 1975, he returned to Szeged, where he was appointed assistant professor, a role he held until 1978, when he was awarded a teaching professorship, leading the Department of Stochastics.

In 1984 he moved to the United States, where he was visiting researcher at the University of California, San Diego, (1984–1985), Stanford University (1985), the University of North Carolina, Chapel Hill (1989–1990), and the University of Michigan, Ann Arbor (1990–1998).

In 2000 he returned to the Bolyai Institute to teach and do research.

Csörgő's work is often cited in highly respected domestic and foreign journals, but most often in English. He is among the ISI Highly Cited Researchers in Mathematics.

In 2001 he was elected as an Associate Member of the Hungarian Academy of Sciences, full Membership following in 2007.

He died in Szeged in 2008 and is buried in Újszeged cemetery.

== Awards ==
- Grünwald Géza Prize (1974)
- Pál Erdős Prize (1987)
- Széchenyi Professorial Grant (1998–2001)
- Akadémiai Prize (1999)
- Tibor Szele Memorial Prize (2004)
- Albert Szent-Györgyi Prize (2005)
- Alapítvány Szegedért Grand Prize (2007)
- Széchenyi Prize (2008, posthumously)
