= Mariza de Andrade =

Brazilian-American biostatistician

- Education: Faculdade de Filosofia, Ciências e Letras de Ribeirão Preto; Instituto Nacional de Matemática Pura e Aplicada; University of Washington (PhD)
- Scientific career
- Institutions: Mayo Clinic
- Thesis: Estimation of the Genotypic Parameters under Non- Normal Models (1990)
- Doctoral advisor: Elizabeth A. Thompson

Mariza de Andrade is a Brazilian-American biostatistician who works as a professor of biostatistics at the Mayo Clinic, and is known for her work on statistical genetics and precision medicine.

== Early life ==
De Andrade earned a bachelor's degree in mathematics from the Faculdade de Filosofia, Ciências e Letras de Ribeirão Preto in São Paulo and a master's degree in statistics at the Instituto Nacional de Matemática Pura e Aplicada in Rio de Janeiro. She moved to the University of Washington for additional graduate study, earning a second master's degree and Ph.D. in biostatistics there. Her 1990 dissertation, Estimation of the Genotypic Parameters under Non- Normal Models, was supervised by Elizabeth A. Thompson.

== Career ==
She was a postdoctoral researcher at the University of Texas Health Science Center at Houston before joining the Mayo Clinic.

In 2004, de Andrade served as president of the Caucus for Women in Statistics. In 2017, the American Statistical Association listed her as one of their Fellows.
