= Cyntha Struthers =

Canadian mathematical statistician

Cyntha Anne Struthers (born 1953 or 1954) is a Canadian mathematical statistician whose research topics include missing data in longitudinal studies and proportional hazards models. She is an associate professor of statistics and actuarial science at the University of Waterloo, and the former president of the Caucus for Women in Statistics.

== Education and career ==
After earning a bachelor's degree in mathematics, and a master's degree in statistics in 1977 from the University of Waterloo, Struthers took a teaching position in mathematics at the university before gaining the confidence to return to doctoral study. She completed her Ph.D. in statistics at Waterloo in 1985); her doctoral dissertation, Asymptotic properties of linear rank tests with censored data, was supervised by Jack Kalbfleisch.

She began working as a mathematics professor at St. Jerome's University in 1985, and chaired the department there, before moving to the University of Waterloo in 2014 when the mathematics programs at St. Jerome's were consolidated into the University of Waterloo.

== Service ==
Struthers was the founding chair of the Canadian section of the Caucus for Women in Statistics, from 1987 to 1989, and served as president of the Caucus for Women in Statistics for the 1991 term. She chaired the Committee on Women in Statistics of the Statistical Society of Canada from 1998 to 2000.
