= Mari Palta =

Swedish biostatistician

Mari Soekõrv Palta is a Swedish-Estonian biostatistician, known for her research on model specification in longitudinal studies, especially in epidemiologic studies of diabetes, sequelae of prematurity and sleep. She is a professor emerita in the Department of Population Health Sciences and the Department of Biostatistics and Medical Informatics at the University of Wisconsin–Madison. She served as vice-chair of Population Health Sciences, and director of graduate studies 2016-2018. She is the author of Quantitative Methods in Population Health: Extensions of Ordinary Regression (Wiley, 2003).

Palta's parents fled Estonia at the time of the Soviet occupation in September 1944 and both worked as physicians, first in Estonia and then in Sweden. Palta was born and grew up mostly in the southern province of Småland, Sweden. She studied mathematics, physics, and English at Lund University. After earning a master's degree in mathematics at the University of Minnesota, she remained at Minnesota for a PhD in biostatistics (1977) and postdoctoral work in epidemiology. Her doctoral dissertation, supervised by Richard McHugh, was Sample Size Determination for Clinical Trials. She taught at the University of Iowa from 1979 until 1982, when she joined the University of Wisconsin–Madison as a research scientist. She became a faculty member at Wisconsin in 1987 and retired in 2018. She continues to be active on several research projects.

Palta was president of the Caucus for Women in Statistics for 2002, and chaired the Committee on Women in Statistics of the American Statistical Association from 2008 to 2010.

She has been a fellow of the American Statistical Association since 2004.
