= Wei Biao Wu =

Chinese-born statistician

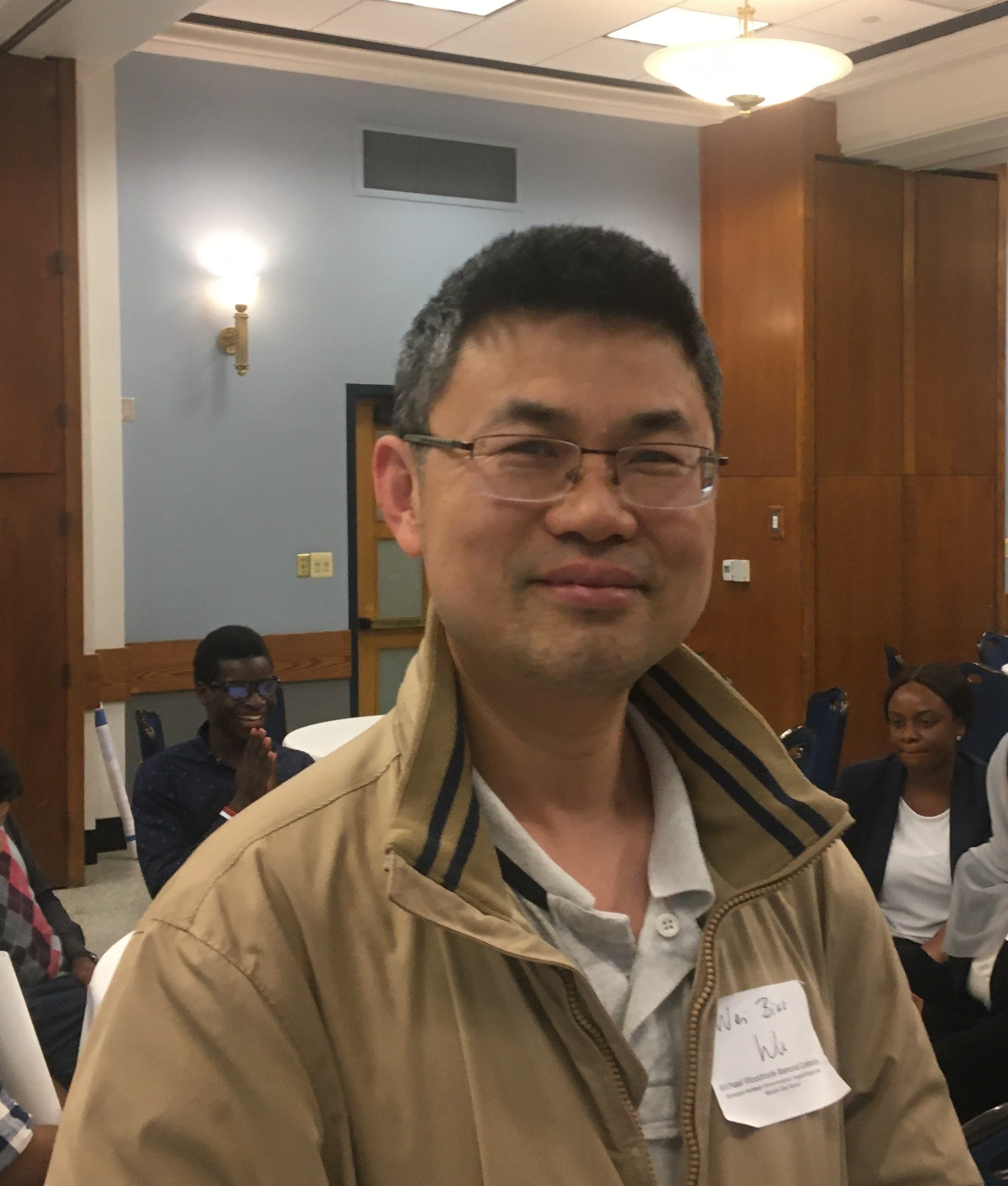
- Wei Biao Wu in 2023
- Other name: Wei-Biao Wu
- Education: University of Michigan (PhD); Fudan University (BS)
- Scientific career
- Fields: Statistics
- Workplaces: University of Chicago
- Thesis: Studies in time series and random dynamics (2001)
- Doctoral advisors: Michael Woodroofe, Sándor Csörgő
- Website: https://www.stat.uchicago.edu/~wbwu/

Wei Biao Wu is a Chinese-born statistician. He is a professor of statistics at the University of Chicago.

== Education and career ==
Wu attended Fudan University, receiving his bachelor's degree in 1997. He went on to the University of Michigan for graduate studies, receiving his PhD in 2001 under the supervision of Michael Woodroofe and Sándor Csörgő. He was hired at the University of Chicago shortly after completing his PhD, and has remained there since.

Wu is best-known for his work on dependence, in which the main new idea is to interpret random processes as physical systems, and to examine coefficients that would have physical meaning. According to Google Scholar, this work has been cited over 800 times. Wu has written over 100 papers.

Wu has more than 20 students and their descendants working in academia.

== Most-cited publications ==
- His most cited article, WB Wu, Nonlinear system theory: Another look at dependence in Proceedings of the National Academy of Sciences (2005) 2005 Oct 4;102(40):14150-4. (open access) has been cited 485 times, according to Google Scholar.
- Wu WB, Pourahmadi M. Nonparametric estimation of large covariance matrices of longitudinal data. Biometrika. 2003 Dec 1;90(4):831-44. (open access) has been cited 341 times, according to Google Scholar
- Wu WB. Strong invariance principles for dependent random variables. The Annals of Probability. 2007;35(6):2294-320. (open access) has been cited 235 times, according to Google Scholar
- Wu WB, Shao X. Limit theorems for iterated random functions. Journal of Applied Probability. 2004 Jun;41(2):425-36. has been cited 194 times, according to Google Scholar
- Wu WB, Zhao Z. Inference of trends in time series. Journal of the Royal Statistical Society, Series B (Statistical Methodology). 2007 Jun;69(3):391-410. (open access) (Cited 172 times, according to Google Scholar.)
- Shao X, Wu WB. Asymptotic spectral theory for nonlinear time series. The Annals of Statistics. 2007 Aug;35(4):1773-801. [](open access) (Cited 199 times, according to Google Scholar. (open access))

In all, he has published 38 papers with ≥38 citations each.

== Personal life ==
Wu has practiced Falun Gong since 1998. His religious practices and criticism of the Chinese Communist Party led to inaction on his 2005 request for renewal of his Chinese passport. Following the loss of his Chinese passport, Wu's Chinese nationality was also revoked.
