= Sharon R. Browning =

Statistical geneticist

- Born: 1973 (age 52–53)
- Education: University of Washington
- Scientific career
- Thesis: Monte Carlo likelihood calculation for identity by descent data (1999)
- Doctoral advisor: Elizabeth A. Thompson

Sharon Ruth Browning is a statistical geneticist at the University of Washington, and a research professor with its Department of Biostatistics. Her research has various implications for the field of biogenetics.

== Education and career ==
Browning has a B.Sc. from the University of Auckland (1995) and earned her Ph.D. in 1999 from the University of Washington. Following her Ph.D., she held positions at Texas A&M University, North Carolina State University, GlaxoSmithKline, and the University of Auckland before moving to the University of Washington in 2010.

== Research ==
Browning is known for her research developing statistical methods for analysis of population genetic data. Her early work established the used of Markov chain modeling to examine association based genome mapping. Her work addresses how to handle missing data in whole-genome association studies. She has also defined the use of group association tests and examined relatedness of individuals based on shared gene content. Browning has also examined the genetic history of the Samoans.

Browning and her research group also study the traces of genetic introgression from archaic humans into modern human DNA. In 2018, they discovered that humans in the distant past had mated with Denisovans in at least two separate events, the second of which may have occurred as humans migrated eastward into Asia and Oceania.

== Selected publications ==
- Browning, Sharon R.; Browning, Brian L. (2007). "Rapid and Accurate Haplotype Phasing and Missing-Data Inference for Whole-Genome Association Studies By Use of Localized Haplotype Clustering". The American Journal of Human Genetics. 81 (5): 1084–1097. doi:10.1086/521987. PMC 2265661. PMID 17924348.
- Browning, Brian L.; Browning, Sharon R. (2009). "A Unified Approach to Genotype Imputation and Haplotype-Phase Inference for Large Data Sets of Trios and Unrelated Individuals". The American Journal of Human Genetics. 84 (2): 210–223. doi:10.1016/j.ajhg.2009.01.005. PMC 2668004. PMID 19200528.
- Madsen, Bo Eskerod; Browning, Sharon R. (2009-02-13). "A Groupwise Association Test for Rare Mutations Using a Weighted Sum Statistic". PLOS Genetics. 5 (2) e1000384. doi:10.1371/journal.pgen.1000384. ISSN 1553-7404. PMC 2633048. PMID 19214210.
