= Stephanie Shipp =

American economist and social statistician

Stephanie Slepicka Shipp is an American economist and social statistician. She works at the University of Virginia as a research professor in the Social and Decision Analytics Division of the Biocomplexity Institute and Initiative.

== Education and career ==
Shipp's parents were both Air Force officers, and her mother was a high school teacher and government librarian. Shipp graduated from Trinity College, Washington DC in 1974, and earned a master's degree at George Washington University in 1977. She completed her Ph.D. in economics at George Washington University in 2000.

She worked as a research assistant at the Federal Reserve Board from 1974 to 1976, and at the Bureau of Labor Statistics from 1976 to 1997. At the Bureau of Labor Statistics, she became chief of the Branch of Information and Analysis in the Division of Consumer Expenditure Surveys in 1983. From 1997 to 2000 she worked as an assistant division chief for the Housing and Household Economic Statistics Division of the United States Census Bureau. After a brief term in the Office of Budget of the United States Department of Commerce, she joined the National Institute of Standards and Technology in 2000 as director of the Economic Assessment Office.

She retired from federal service in 2008, and took a position as senior research staff in the Science and Technology Policy Institute. In 2013 she moved to Virginia Tech as founding deputy director and research professor in the Social and Decision Analytics Laboratory. In 2018 the Biocomplexity Institute, including the Social and Decision Analytics group, moved en masse from Virginia Tech to the University of Virginia.

== Service ==
Shipp was president of the Caucus for Women in Statistics for the 1992 term. She was also president of the Department of Commerce Senior Executives Association for 2003–2004, and chaired the Government Statistics Section of the American Statistical Association for 2005–2007.

== Recognition ==
Shipp became an elected member of the International Statistical Institute in 2001. She was elected as a Fellow of the American Statistical Association in 2002, and as a fellow of the American Association for the Advancement of Science in 2014 "for social and behavioral sciences research and leadership in translating science into action for the betterment of society".

She won the Jeanne E. Griffith Mentoring Award in 2007. In 2022 Shipp was recipient of the American Statistical Association's Founders Award.
