= Holly Shulman =

American reproductive health statistician

Holly B. Shulman is an American statistician in the Division of Reproductive Health of the Centers for Disease Control and Prevention (CDC), a developer of the Pregnancy Risk Assessment Monitoring System for the CDC, and the former president of the Caucus for Women in Statistics. As well as her work on the Pregnancy Risk Assessment Monitoring System, her publications include highly cited work on abortion-related deaths.

== Early life and education ==
Shulman is originally from Atlanta, Georgia, where she was an honors student in mathematics. Her interest in statistics began in a high school mathematics summer program, part of the Georgia Governor's Honors Program. She majored in mathematics at Georgia Tech, and went on to do a master's degree in statistics at the University of California, Berkeley.

== Career and later life ==
Shulman has worked for the Centers for Disease Control and Prevention for over 35 years. She was president of the Caucus for Women in Statistics for 1999, and chaired the American Statistical Association's Committee on Women in Statistics in 2000.

== Selected publications ==
- Lawson, Herschel W.; Frye, Alice; Atrash, Hani K.; Smith, Jack C.; Shulman, Holly B.; Ramick, Merrell (November 1994), "Abortion mortality, United States, 1972 through 1987", American Journal of Obstetrics and Gynecology, 171 (5): 1365–1372, doi:10.1016/0002-9378(94)90162-7, PMID 7977548
- Gilbert, Brenda Colley; Shulman, Holly B.; Fischer, Laurie A.; Rogers, Mary M. (1999), Maternal and Child Health Journal, vol. 3 (4 ed.), pp. 199–209, doi:10.1023/a:1022325421844, PMID 10791360, S2CID 35868551
- Bartlett, Linda A.; Berg, Cynthia J.; Shulman, Holly B.; Zane, Suzanne B.; Green, Clarice A.; Whitehead, Sara; Atrash, Hani K. (April 2004), "Risk Factors for Legal Induced Abortion–Related Mortality in the United States", Obstetrics & Gynecology, 103 (4): 729–737, doi:10.1097/01.aog.0000116260.81570.60, PMID 15051566
- Shulman, Holly B.; Gilbert, Brenda Colley; Lansky, Amy (January 2006), "The Pregnancy Risk Assessment Monitoring System (PRAMS): Current Methods and Evaluation of 2001 Response Rates", Public Health Reports, 121 (1): 74–83, doi:10.1177/003335490612100114, PMC 1497801, PMID 16416701
- Shulman, Holly B.; D'Angelo, Denise V.; Harrison, Leslie; Smith, Ruben A.; Warner, Lee (October 2018), "The Pregnancy Risk Assessment Monitoring System (PRAMS): Overview of Design and Methodology", American Journal of Public Health, 108 (10): 1305–1313, doi:10.2105/ajph.2018.304563, PMC 6137777, PMID 30138070
