= Bodhisattva Sen =

Indian-American statistician

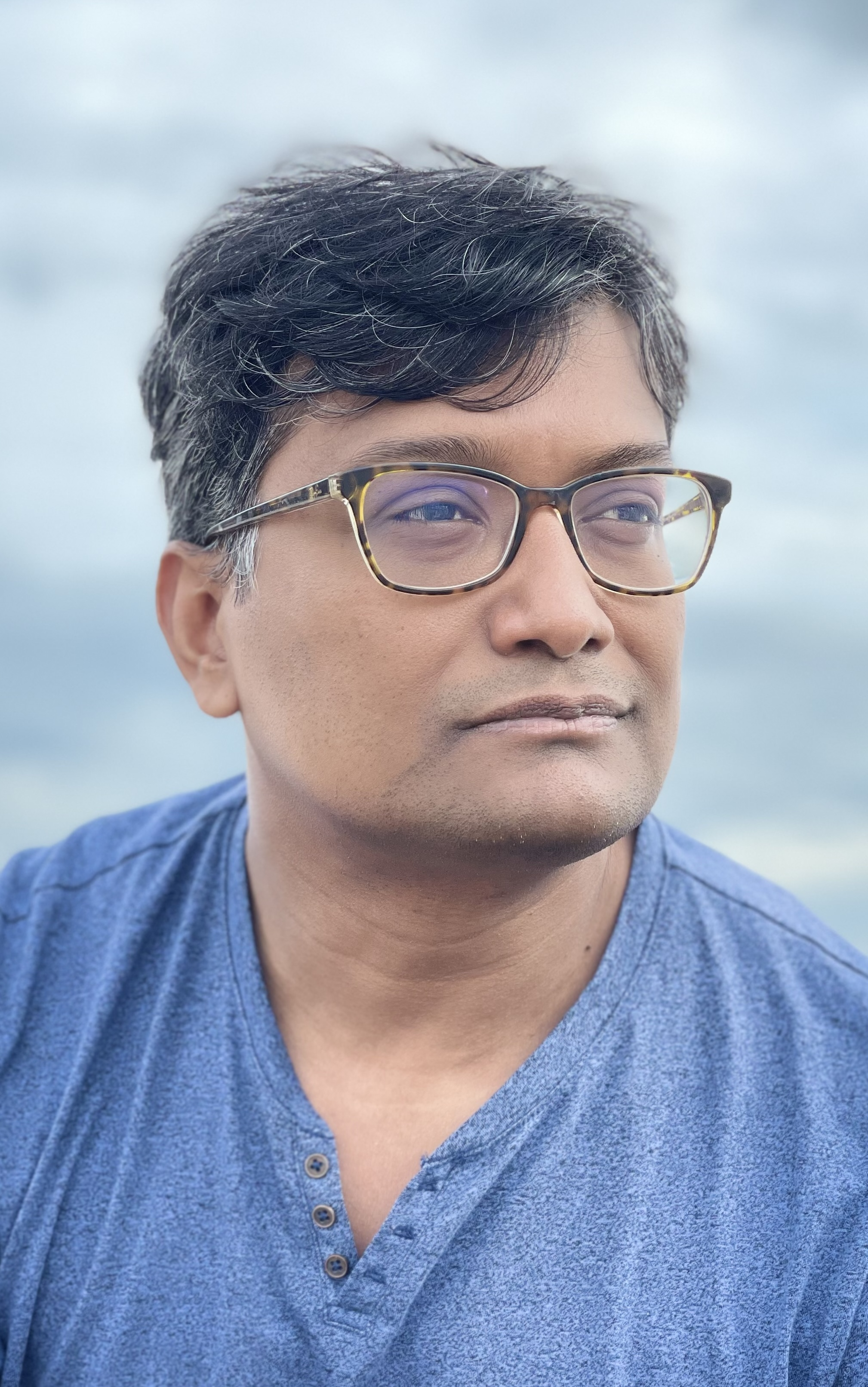
- Sen in 2022
- Education: Indian Statistical Institute; University of Michigan (PhD)
- Scientific career
- Fields: Statistics
- Workplaces: Columbia University

Bodhisattva Sen is an Indian-American statistician.

Sen earned his bachelor and master of statistics from the Indian Statistical Institute in 2002 and 2004, respectively. He then completed a doctorate in statistics at the University of Michigan in the United States. Sen's doctoral dissertation, A Study of Bootstrap And Likelihood Based Methods In Non-standard Problems, was published in 2008 and jointly advised by Michael Woodroofe and Moulinath Banerjee.

Sen joined the Columbia University Department of Statistics as an assistant professor in 2008. Sen was successively promoted to an associate professorship in 2013, and a full professorship in 2020. In 2022, he was elected a fellow of the Institute of Mathematical Statistics for "important contributions to nonparametric inference under shape constraints, optimal transport and its applications to Statistics, and the bootstrap".
