= Martha Aliaga =

Argentine statistics educator (1937–2011)

- Born: Martha Beatriz Bilotti; November 25, 1937; Mendoza, Argentina
- Died: October 15, 2011 (aged 73); Columbia, Maryland, U.S.
- Education: University of Buenos Aires; University of Michigan
- Spouse: Alfredo Aliaga
- Children: 3
- Scientific career
- Fields: Statistics
- Institutions: American University; University of the District of Columbia; University of Michigan

Academic background
- Thesis: A problem in sequential analysis (1986)
- Academic advisor: Michael Woodroofe

Martha Beatriz Bilotti-Aliaga (1937 – October 15, 2011) was an Argentine statistics educator, who served as the president of the Caucus for Women in Statistics.

== Early life and education ==
Martha Beatriz Bilotti was born in Mendoza, Argentina, and did her undergraduate studies at the University of Buenos Aires. She earned a master's degree in Santiago, Chile, at the Inter-American Center for the Teaching of Statistics.

She completed a doctorate in statistics at the University of Michigan in 1986; her dissertation, supervised by Michael B. Woodroofe, was A problem in sequential analysis.

== Personal life ==
She married Alfredo Aliaga of Columbia, Maryland, and they had three children: Viviana, Pablo and Eduardo.

== Career ==
After teaching in the Dominican Republic, she moved to Ann Arbor, Michigan, to become an associate professor at the University of Michigan in 1972. She taught from 1981 to 1985 at American University, and in the late 1980s at both the University of the District of Columbia and the University of Michigan (commuting between the two).

She was president of the Caucus for Women in Statistics in 2002, and moved from Michigan to the American Statistical Association in 2003 as director of education.

With Brenda Gunderson, she wrote a statistics textbook, Interactive Statistics (Prentice Hall, 1999; 4th ed., 2017).

In 1999, Aliaga was elected as a Fellow of the American Statistical Association, and a member of the International Statistical Institute.

== Death ==
Aliaga died on October 15, 2011, of gallbladder cancer at her home in Columbia.
