= Motomi Mori =

Japanese biostatistician

- Born: Hakodate, Japan
- Occupation: Statistician

Motomi (Tomi) Mori is a Japanese biostatistician. Formerly the Walter & Clora Brownfield Professor of Cancer Biostatistics at the Knight Cancer Institute of Oregon Health & Science University (OHSU), she was named endowed professor and chair of biostatistics at St. Jude Children's Research Hospital in 2020. She is the chair of the Caucus for Women in Statistics for 2021.

== Early life ==
Mori was born in Hakodate, Japan, and lived in Japan through high school.

== Education ==
She graduated from the University of Montana in 1982, with a major in psychology and a minor in mathematics. An undergraduate mentor, James Walsh, who worked in psychometrics encouraged her to pursue statistics instead because of its greater flexibility. She earned a master's degree in statistics from the University of Iowa in 1985, and completed her Ph.D. in biostatistics at Iowa in 1989. Her dissertation, in mathematical statistics and jointly supervised by George G. Woodworth and Robert F. Woolson, was Analysis of Incomplete Longitudinal Data is the Presence of Informative Right Censoring. Her research during this time also included more applied work on hospital-acquired infections.

After completing her doctorate, she worked at the Fred Hutchinson Cancer Research Center and University of Washington. In 1991 she moved to the Huntsman Cancer Institute at the University of Utah, where she worked with the National Marrow Donor Program on statistical issues related to matching bone marrow donors to patients from minority groups. She joined OHSU in 1999, where she studies biomarkers, personalized medicine, and targeted therapy for cancer. At OHSU, she directed the Division of Biostatistics from 2004 to 2014; she also earned an MBA there in 2016.

In 2010, she became a Fellow of the American Statistical Association.

== Recognition ==
In 2020, Mori won the Award for Outstanding Contribution to the Development of the International Biometric Society.
