= DASH diet =

Diet to control hypertension

The Dietary Approaches to Stop Hypertension (DASH) diet is a diet to control hypertension promoted by the U.S.-based National Heart, Lung, and Blood Institute, part of the National Institutes of Health (NIH), an agency of the United States Department of Health and Human Services. The DASH diet is rich in fruits, vegetables, whole grains, and low-fat dairy foods. It includes meat, fish, poultry, nuts, and beans, and is limited in sugar-sweetened foods and beverages, red meat, and added fats. In addition to its effect on blood pressure, it is designed to be a well-balanced approach to eating for the general public. DASH is recommended by the United States Department of Agriculture (USDA) as a healthy eating plan. The DASH diet is one of three healthy diets recommended in the 2015–20 U.S. Dietary Guidelines, which also include the Mediterranean diet and a vegetarian diet. The American Heart Association (AHA) considers the DASH diet "specific and well-documented across age, sex and ethnically diverse groups."

The DASH diet is based on NIH studies that examined three dietary plans and their results. None of the plans were vegetarian, but the DASH plan incorporated more fruits and vegetables, low fat or non-fat dairy, beans, and nuts than the others studied. The DASH diet reduced systolic blood pressure by 6 mm Hg and diastolic blood pressure by 3 mm Hg in patients with high normal blood pressure (formerly called "pre-hypertension"). Those with hypertension dropped by 11 and 6 mm Hg, respectively. These changes in blood pressure occurred with no changes in body weight. The DASH dietary pattern is adjusted based on daily caloric intake ranging from 1,600 to 3,100 dietary calories. Although this diet is associated with a reduction of blood pressure and improvement of gout, there are uncertainties around whether its recommendation of low-fat dairy products is beneficial or detrimental. The diet is also advised to diabetic or obese individuals.

The DASH diet was further tested and developed in the Optimal Macronutrient Intake Trial for Heart Health (OmniHeart diet). "The DASH and DASH-sodium trials demonstrated that a carbohydrate-rich diet that emphasizes fruits, vegetables, and low-fat dairy products and that is reduced in saturated fat, total fat, and cholesterol substantially lowered blood pressure and low-density lipoprotein cholesterol. OmniHeart demonstrated that partial replacement of carbohydrate with either protein (about half from plant sources) or with unsaturated fat (mostly monounsaturated fat) can further reduce blood pressure, low-density lipoprotein cholesterol, and coronary heart disease risk."

In January 2018, DASH was named the number one for "Best Diets Overall" for the eighth year in a row, and also as "For Healthy Eating", and "Best Heart-Healthy Diet"; and tied number two "For Diabetes"(out of 40 diets tested) in the U.S. News & World Report's annual "Best Diets" rankings.

The DASH diet is similar to the Mediterranean diet and the AHA diet, and has been one of the main sources for the MIND diet recommendations.

== Description ==
The DASH diet is mainly based on fruits, vegetables, low-fat or fat free dairy, whole grains, fish, poultry, legumes, and nuts. It recommends reducing sodium intake, sweets (in drinks and foods), and red meat. It limits saturated fat and trans fat, while increasing the intake of potassium, magnesium, protein, fiber, and nutrients thought to help control blood pressure.

The National Heart, Lung, and Blood Institute provides sample plans with specific number of servings based on 1600, 2000 or 2600 calories per day. Here is the sample plan for 2000 calories daily:

- 6–8 servings of grains or grain products (preferable whole-grain)
- 4–5 servings of fruits
- 4–5 servings of vegetables
- 2–3 servings of low-fat dairy foods
- 2–3 servings of fats and oils
- 2 or fewer servings of meat, poultry or fish

With the following weekly limitations:

- 4–5 servings of nuts, seeds or dry beans
- sweets, desserts, food with added sugars limited to a maximum of 5 servings

Following this diet requires some planning and cooking. To ease this, both the NHLBI and NIH maintain lists of healthy recipes.

There is some conflicting data about the need for low-fat dairy foods, with some studies showing beneficial effects while others detrimental effects.

Elements can be replaced by alternatives for those with allergies or lactose intolerance, such as lactose-free products instead of dairy, and seeds instead of nuts. There is some evidence that replacing animal proteins with plant-based proteins, such as nuts and seeds, reduces mortality risks.

Some people may at first experience gas and bloating due to the high fiber content of plant foods such as fruits, vegetables and whole grains. This can be partially alleviated by limiting high fiber foods intake to 1 or 2 per week initially and progressively increasing. This may also be alleviated by substituting high-protein sources of fiber, like beans, with high-carbohydrate sources of fiber, like whole grains.

DASH in addition with a reduction of sodium intake is associated with a reduction of blood pressure, in both individuals with and without hypertension.

== Health effects ==
=== Cardiovascular disease and hypertension ===
The first modifications recommended by guidelines for people at risk of cardiovascular disease are typically lifestyle changes, such as diet and physical activity followed by pharmacotherapy. A diet that consists of high sodium (>2g daily), sugar-sweetened beverages, red meat (>14g/d) and processed red meat consumption have been associated with cardiovascular death. The DASH diet along with similar diets like the Mediterranean diet that are rich in vegetables and fruit and low in saturated fats and trans fats are encouraged by multiple cardiovascular guidelines including the American Heart Association and American College of Cardiology, Canadian Cardiovascular Society, and 2016 European Guidelines.

Hypertension is a cardiovascular disease risk factor and blood pressure has been used as a surrogate marker for cardiovascular disease benefits. The DASH diet is seen in many guidelines for hypertension; which is typically defined as having a blood pressure greater than 140/90 mmHg with some guidelines defining it as having a blood pressure greater than 130/90 mmHg.

In a systematic review, the DASH diet reduced blood pressure by an average of 5.2/2.6 mmHg, however the blood pressure lowering effects may vary and will typically have a greater effect in people with a higher baseline blood pressure (especially those with hypertension) or BMI. The review found the DASH diet to reduce total cholesterol concentrations by 0.20 mmol/L. Using the average values for reductions in cholesterol levels and BP, the review concluded that the DASH diet was found to reduce the 10-year Framingham risk score for cardiovascular disease by about 13%.

== History and design ==
=== Background ===
Currently, hypertension is thought to affect roughly 50 million people in the U.S. and approximately 1 billion worldwide. According to the National Heart, Lung and Blood Institute (NHLBI), citing data from 2002, "The relationship between BP and risk of cardiovascular disease (CVD) events is continuous, consistent, and independent of other risk factors. The higher the BP, the greater is the chance of heart attack, heart failure, stroke, and kidney disease. For individuals 40–70 years of age, each increment of 20 mm Hg in systolic BP (SBP) or 10 mm Hg in diastolic BP (DBP) doubles the risk of CVD across the entire BP range from 115/75 to 185/115 mm Hg.".

The prevalence of hypertension led the U.S. National Institutes of Health (NIH) to propose funding to further research the role of dietary patterns on blood pressure. In 1992 the NHLBI worked with five of the most well-respected medical research centers in different cities across the U.S. to conduct the largest and most detailed research study to date. The DASH study used a rigorous design called a randomized controlled trial (RCT), and it involved teams of physicians, nurses, nutritionists, statisticians, and research coordinators working in a cooperative venture in which participants were selected and studied in each of these five research facilities. The chosen facilities and locales for this multi-center study were: (1) Johns Hopkins University in Baltimore, Maryland, (2) Duke University Medical Center in Durham, North Carolina, (3) Kaiser Permanente Center for Health Research in Portland, Oregon, (4) Brigham and Women's Hospital in Boston, Massachusetts, and (5) Pennington Biomedical Research Center in Baton Rouge, Louisiana.

Two DASH trials were designed and carried out as multi-center, randomized, outpatient feeding studies with the purpose of testing the effects of dietary patterns on blood pressure. The standardized multi-center protocol is an approach used in many large-scale multi-center studies funded by the NHLBI. A unique feature of the DASH diet was that the foods and menu were chosen based on conventionally consumed food items so it could be more easily adopted by the general public if results were positive. The initial DASH study was begun in August 1993 and ended in July 1997. Contemporary epidemiological research had concluded that dietary patterns with high intakes of certain minerals and fiber were associated with low blood pressures. The nutritional conceptualization of the DASH meal plans was based in part on this research.

=== Diet ===
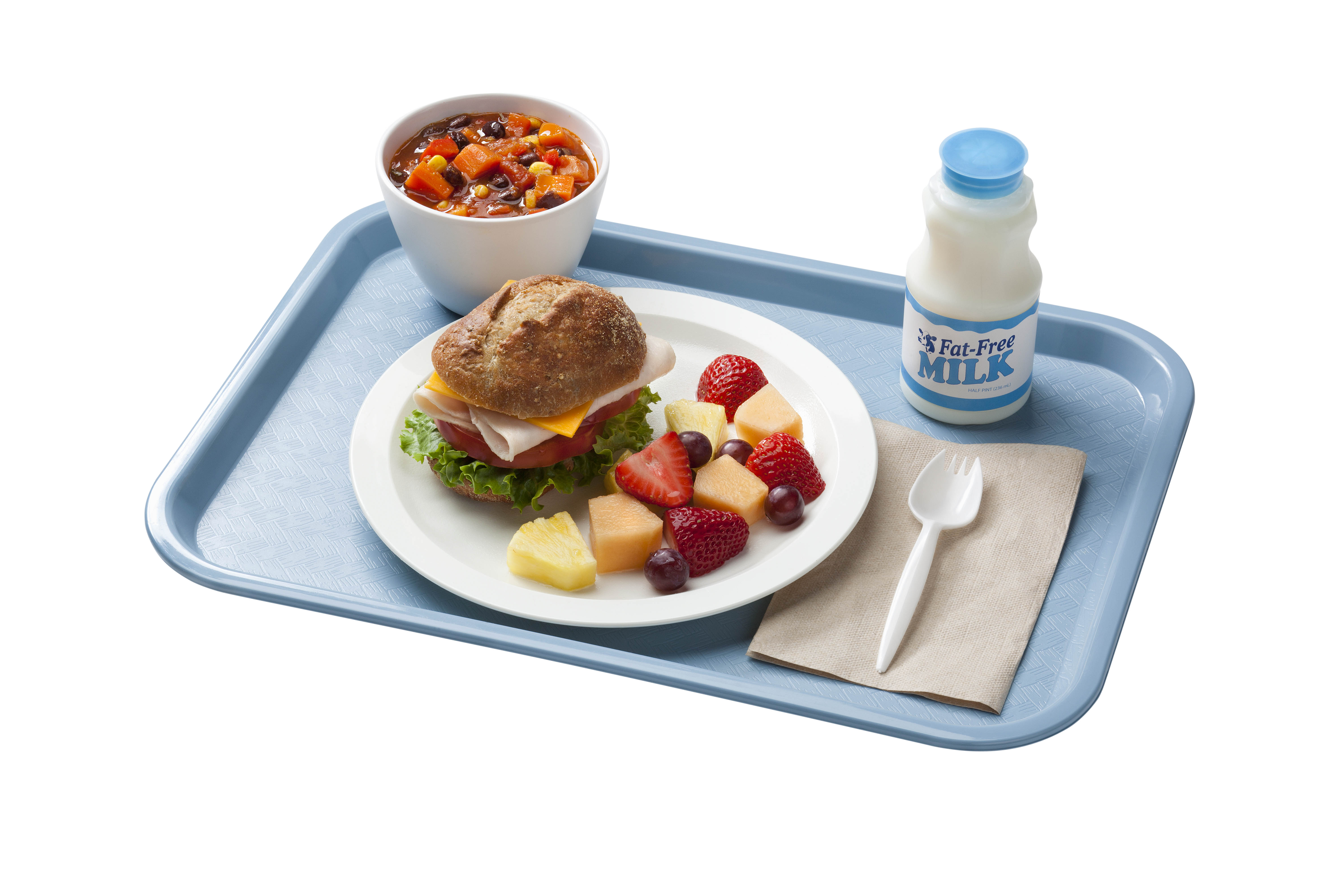
A sandwich made with whole-grain bread and low-sodium, low-fat meat or cheese, paired with fruits, vegetables, and fat-free milk could meet the goals of the DASH diet.

Two experimental diets were selected for the DASH study and compared with each other, and with a third: the control diet. The control diet was low in potassium, calcium, magnesium and fiber and featured a fat and protein profile so that the pattern was consistent with a "typical American diet at the time". The first experimental diet was higher in fruits and vegetables but otherwise similar to the control diet (a "fruits and vegetables diet"), with the exception of fewer snacks and sweets. Magnesium and potassium levels were close to the 75th percentile of U.S. consumption in the fruits-and-vegetables diet, which also featured a high-fiber profile. The second experimental diet was high in fruits and vegetables and in low-fat dairy products, as well as lower in overall fat and saturated fat, with higher fiber and higher protein compared with the control diet—this diet has been called "the DASH diet". The DASH diet (or combination diet) was rich in potassium, magnesium and calcium—a nutrient profile roughly equivalent with the 75th percentile of U.S. consumption. The combination or "DASH" diet was also high in whole grains, poultry, fish, and nuts while being lower in red meat content, sweets, and sugar-containing beverages.

The DASH diet was designed to provide liberal amounts of key nutrients thought to play a part in lowering blood pressure, based on past epidemiologic studies. One of the unique features of the DASH study was that dietary patterns rather than single nutrients were being tested. The DASH diet also features a high quotient of antioxidant-rich foods thought by some to retard or prevent chronic health problems, including cancer, heart disease, and stroke.

Researchers have also found that the DASH diet is more effective than a low-oxalate diet in the prevention and treatment of kidney stones, specifically calcium oxalate kidney stones (the most common type).

=== Study design ===
Participants ate one of the three aforementioned dietary patterns in 3 separate phases of the trial, including (1) Screening, (2), Run-in and (3) Intervention. In the screening phase, participants were screened for eligibility based on the combined results of blood pressure readings. In the 3 week run-in phase, each subject was given the control diet for 3 weeks, had their blood pressure measurements taken on each of five separate days, gave one 24-hour urine sample and completed a questionnaire on symptoms. At this point, subjects who were compliant with the feeding program during the screening phase were each randomly assigned to one of the three diets outlined above, to begin at the start of the 4th week. The intervention phase followed next; this was an 8-week period in which the subjects were provided the diet to which they had been randomly assigned. Blood pressures and urine samples were collected again during this time together with symptom & physical activity recall questionnaires. The first group of study subjects began the run-in phase of the trial in September 1994 while the fifth and final group began in January 1996. Each of the three diets contained the same 3 grams (3,000 mg) of sodium, selected because that was the approximate average intake in the nation at the time. Participants were also given two packets of salt, each containing 200 mg of sodium, for discretionary use. Alcohol was limited to no more than two beverages per day, and caffeine intake was limited to no more than three caffeinated beverages.

== Study results ==
The DASH trial showed that dietary patterns can and do affect blood pressure in the high normal BP to moderately hypertensive adult population (systolic < 180 mm Hg & diastolic of 80 to 95 mm Hg). Respectively, the DASH or "combination" diet lowered blood pressures by an average of 5.5 and 3.0 mm Hg for systolic and diastolic, compared with the control diet. The minority portion of the study sample and the hypertensive portion both showed the largest reductions in blood pressure from the combination diet against the control diet. The hypertensive subjects experienced a drop of 11.4 mm Hg in their systolic and 5.5 mm Hg in their diastolic phases. The fruits-and-vegetables diet was also successful, although it produced more modest reductions compared with the control diet (2.8 mm Hg systolic and 1.1 mm Hg diastolic). In the subjects with and without hypertension, the combination diet effectively reduced blood pressure more than the fruits-and-vegetables diet or the control diet did. The data indicated that reductions in blood pressure occurred within two weeks of subjects' starting their designated diets, and that the results were generalizable to the target sample of the U.S. population. Side effects were negligible, but the NEJM study reports that some subjects reported constipation as a problem. At the end of the intervention phase, 10.1, 5.4 & 4.0 percent of the subjects reported this problem for the control, fruits-and-vegetables and combination diets, respectively, showing that the fruits and vegetables and combination diets reduce constipation. Apart from only one subject (on the control diet) who was suffering from cholecystitis, other gastrointestinal symptoms had a low rate of incidence.

== DASH-Sodium study ==
=== Design ===
The DASH-Sodium study was conducted following the end of the original DASH study to determine whether the DASH diet could produce even better results if it were low in salt and also to examine the effects of different levels of sodium in people eating the DASH diet. The researchers were interested in determining the effects of sodium reduction when combined with the DASH diet as well as the effects of the DASH diet when at three levels of sodium intake. The DASH-Sodium trial was conducted from September 1997 through November 1999. Like the previous study, it was based on a large sample (412 participants) and was a multi-center, randomized, outpatient feeding study where the subjects were given all their food. The participants were adults with prehypertension or stage 1 hypertension (average systolic of 120 to 159 mm Hg & average diastolic of 80 to 95 mm Hg) and were randomly assigned to one of two diet groups. The two randomized diet groups were the DASH diet and a control diet that mirrored a "typical American diet", and which was somewhat low in key nutrients such as potassium, magnesium and calcium. The DASH diet was the same as in the previous DASH study. After being assigned to one of these two diets, the participants were given diets that differed by 3 distinct levels of sodium content, corresponding to 3,000 mg, 2,400 mg or 1,500 mg/day (higher, intermediate or lower). Each sodium level was consumed for 30 consecutive days in random order. During a two-week run-in phase, all participants ate a high sodium control diet. This was followed by a 30-day intervention phase, during which participants consumed their assigned diet at each of the three sodium levels in a randomized crossover design. Thus, over the course of the intervention, each participant consumed their assigned diet (DASH or control) at all three sodium levels, for 30 days each.

=== Results and conclusions ===
The primary outcome of the DASH-Sodium study was systolic blood pressure at the end of the 30-day dietary intervention periods. The secondary outcome was diastolic blood pressure. The DASH-Sodium study found that reductions in sodium intake produced significantly lower systolic and diastolic blood pressures in both the control and DASH diets. Study results indicate that the quantity of dietary sodium in the control diet was twice as powerful in its effect on blood pressure as it was in the DASH diet. Importantly, the control diet sodium reductions from intermediate to low correlated with greater changes in systolic blood pressure than those same changes from high to intermediate (change equal to roughly 40 mmol per day, or 1 gram of sodium).

As stated by Sacks, F. et al., reductions in sodium intake by this amount per day correlated with greater decreases in blood pressure when the starting sodium intake level was already at the U.S. recommended dietary allowance, than when the starting level was higher (higher levels are the actual average in the U.S.). These results led researchers to postulate that the adoption of a national lower daily allowance for sodium than the currently held 2,400 mg could be based on the sound scientific results provided by this study. The U.S. Dietary Guidelines for Americans recommend eating a diet of 2300 mg of sodium a day or lower, with a recommendation of 1500 mg/day in adults who have elevated blood pressure; the 1500 mg/day is the low sodium level tested in the DASH-Sodium study.

The DASH diet and the control diet at the lower salt levels were both successful in lowering blood pressure, but the largest reductions in blood pressure were obtained by eating a combination of these two (i.e., a lower-salt version of the DASH diet). The effect of this combination at a sodium level of 1,500 mg/day was an average blood pressure reduction of 8.9/4.5 mm Hg (systolic/diastolic). The hypertensive subjects experienced an average reduction of 11.5/5.7 mm Hg. The DASH-sodium results indicate that low sodium levels correlated with the largest reductions in blood pressure for participants at both pre-hypertensive and hypertensive levels, with the hypertensive participants showing the greatest reductions in blood pressure overall.

== OmniHeart and OmniCarb ==
Following the publication of DASH and DASH-Sodium studies, the Welch Clinical Research teams published the OmniHeart and OmniCarb studies.

== See also ==
- Low sodium diet
- List of diets
