= Michael Woodroofe =

American probabilist and statistician (1940–2022)

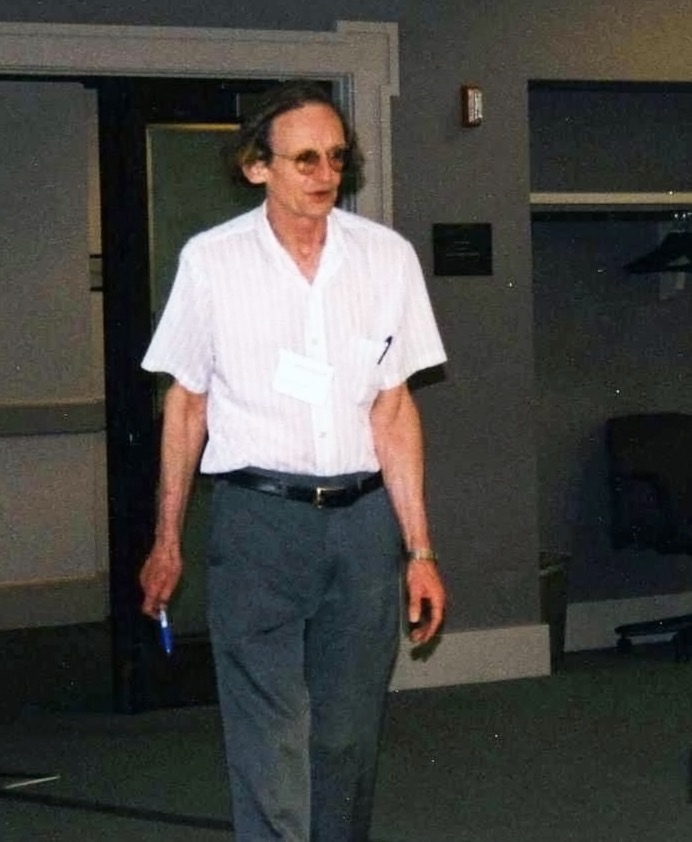
- Woodroofe lecturing in 2002
- Born: Michael Barrett Woodroofe; March 17, 1940; Corvallis, Oregon, U.S.
- Died: February 22, 2022 (aged 81)
- Education: Stanford University (BS); University of Oregon (PhD)
- Scientific career
- Fields: Statistics, Mathematics
- Workplaces: University of Michigan
- Thesis: Statistical Properties of the Number of Positive Sums (1965)
- Doctoral advisor: Theodore Matthes
- Doctoral students: Martha Aliaga; Nancy E. Heckman; Dong-Yun Kim; Mary C. Meyer; Bodhisattva Sen; Wei Biao Wu
- Website: dept.stat.lsa.umich.edu/~michaelw/

Michael Barrett Woodroofe (March 17, 1940 – February 22, 2022) was an American probabilist and statistician. He was a professor of statistics and of mathematics at the University of Michigan, where he was the Leonard J. Savage Professor until his retirement. He was noted for his work in sequential analysis and nonlinear renewal theory, in central limit theory, and in nonparametric inference with shape constraints.

== Education and career ==
Woodroofe was born in Corvallis, Oregon, and grew up in nearby Athena, Oregon. He received his Bachelor of Science in mathematics from Stanford University in 1962. He went on to the University of Oregon for his masters and PhD in mathematics, which he completed in 1965.

After his PhD, he spent a brief stint as an assistant professor at Carnegie Mellon University, before moving to the University of Michigan in 1968. He spent the rest of his career at Michigan, where he was a founding member of the statistics department. In 1994 he was named the Leonard J. Savage Professor, a position which he held until his retirement in 2009.

Woodroofe was particularly noted for his work in sequential analysis and nonlinear renewal theory, in central limit theory, and in nonparametric inference with shape constraints.

Woodroofe advised over 40 graduate students, many of whom have gone on to distinguished careers of their own. He published over 100 research articles, and 2 books. He served as editor of the Annals of Statistics from 1992 to 1994, and was the last solo editor of the journal.

== Personal life ==
Woodroofe died on February 22, 2022, at the age of 81.

== Awards and honors ==
- The Michael Woodroofe Lecture Series was established in 2008 by the University of Michigan Department of Statistics in recognition of Woodroofe's contributions.
- A Conference on Nonparametric Inference and Probability with Applications to Science was held in 2005 to honor Woodroofe's career on the occasion of his 65th birthday.
- Woodroofe was a fellow of the Institute of Mathematical Statistics.

== Selected publications ==
- Woodroofe, Michael (1974). Probability with applications. New York: McGraw-Hill. ISBN 978-0-07-071718-3. MR 0372930.
- Woodroofe, Michael (1982). Nonlinear renewal theory in sequential analysis. Philadelphia, Pa: Society for Industrial and Applied Mathematics. ISBN 978-0-89871-180-6. MR 0660065.
- Woodroofe, Michael (1985). "Estimating a Distribution Function with Truncated Data". The Annals of Statistics. 13 (1): 163–177. doi:10.1214/aos/1176346584. ISSN 0090-5364. MR 0773160.
- Woodroofe, Michael; Maxwell, Michael (2000). "Central limit theorems for additive functionals of Markov chains". The Annals of Probability. 28 (2): 713–724. doi:10.1214/aop/1019160258. ISSN 0091-1798. MR 1782272.
