= Mary C. Meyer =

American statistician

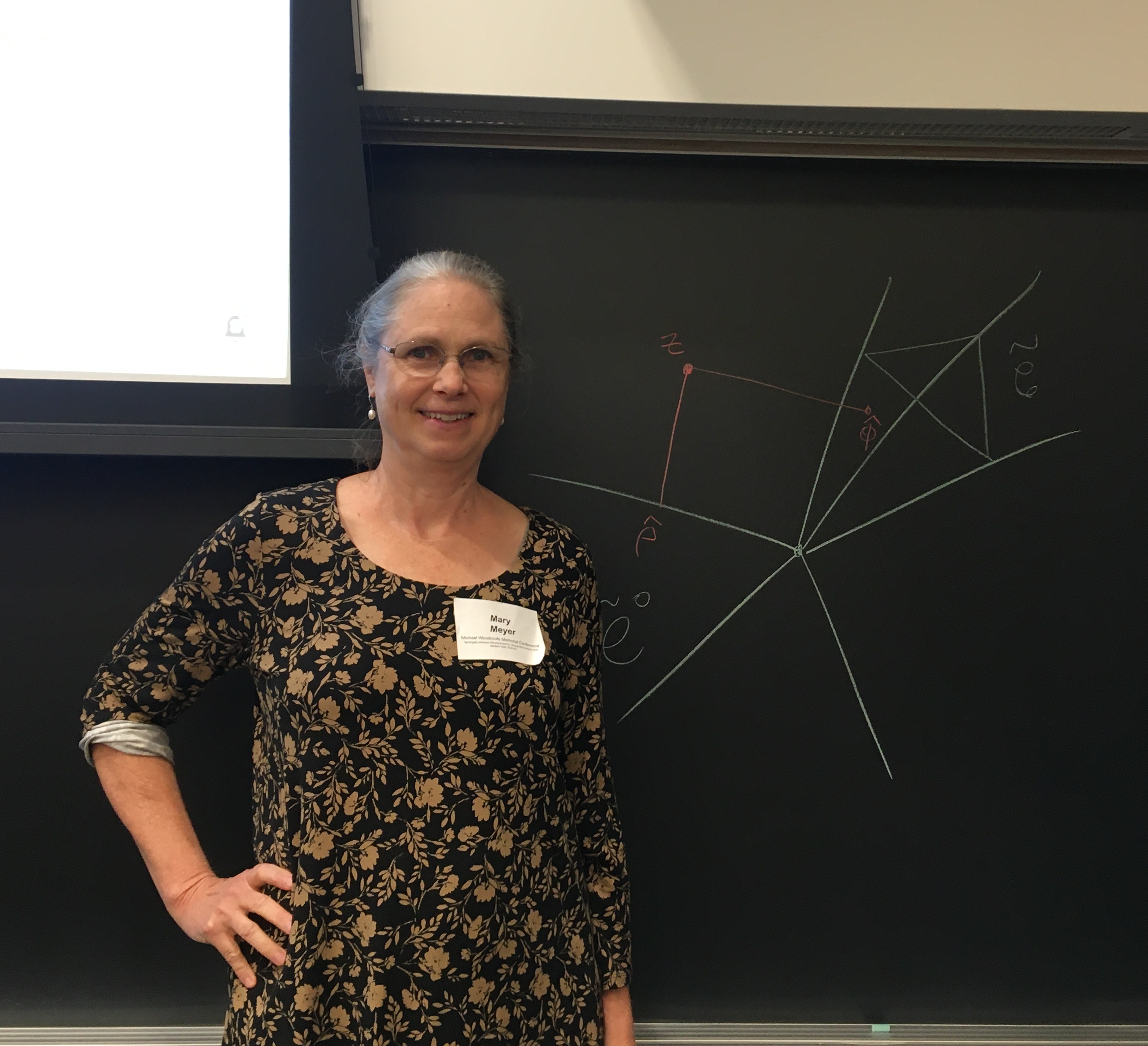
- Mary C. Meyer in 2023
- Scientific career
- Fields: Statistics
- Institutions: University of Georgia; Colorado State University

Mary C. Meyer is an American statistician. She is known for both theoretical and computational research in nonparametric statistics and density estimation, especially for densities with shape constraints such as convexity or monotonicity. She is a professor of statistics at Colorado State University.

== Education and career ==
Meyer obtained her Ph.D. in 1996 from the University of Michigan, under the supervision of Michael Woodroofe. Her dissertation was Shape-Restricted Inference with Applications to Nonparametric Regression, Smooth Nonparametric Function Estimation, and Density Estimation. She was a faculty member in statistics at the University of Georgia before moving to Colorado State University.

While a statistics professor at Colorado State University, Meyer declared that a study of salaries by CSU created salary goals for women faculty that were "substantially smaller than for men". This led CSU to start studying pay equity in 2015, which in turn led later that year to a quarter of female full professors receiving higher pay. She has also led faculty opposition to increases in athletic spending by the university.

== Book ==
Meyer is the author of the textbook Probability and Mathematical Statistics: Theory, Applications, and Practice in R (Society for Industrial and Applied Mathematics, 2019).
