= Jiayang Sun =

Chinese-American statistician

Jiayang Sun is an American statistician whose research has included work on simultaneous confidence bands for multiple comparisons, selection bias, mixture models, Gaussian random fields, machine learning, big data, statistical computing, graphics, and applications in biostatistics, biomedical research, software bug tracking, astronomy, and intellectual property law. She is a statistics professor, Bernard J. Dunn Eminent Scholar, and chair of the statistics department at George Mason University, and a former president of the Caucus for Women in Statistics.

== Education and career ==
Sun earned a bachelor's degree in mathematics from Anhui University and a master's degree from Peking University. She completed her Ph.D. at Stanford University in 1989. Her dissertation, $P$-Values in Projection Pursuit, was supervised by David Siegmund.

After she completed her doctorate, she became a faculty member at the University of Michigan and later at Case Western Reserve University, where she became an associate and full professor in statistics, and then a professor of biostatistics and director of Case's Center for Statistical Research, Computing and Collaboration. In 2019 she moved to the department of statistics at George Mason University as professor, Bernard J. Dunn Eminent Scholar, and department chair. She also became an ASA/ACM/AMS/IMS/MAA/SIAM Science and Technology Policy Fellow for 2019–2020, working with the United States Department of Agriculture in Washington, DC.

== Recognition ==
Sun is a Fellow of the American Statistical Association and of the Institute of Mathematical Statistics, and an Elected Member of the International Statistical Institute. She served as president of the Caucus for Women in Statistics for the 2016 term.
