= Dong-Yun Kim =

Biostatistician

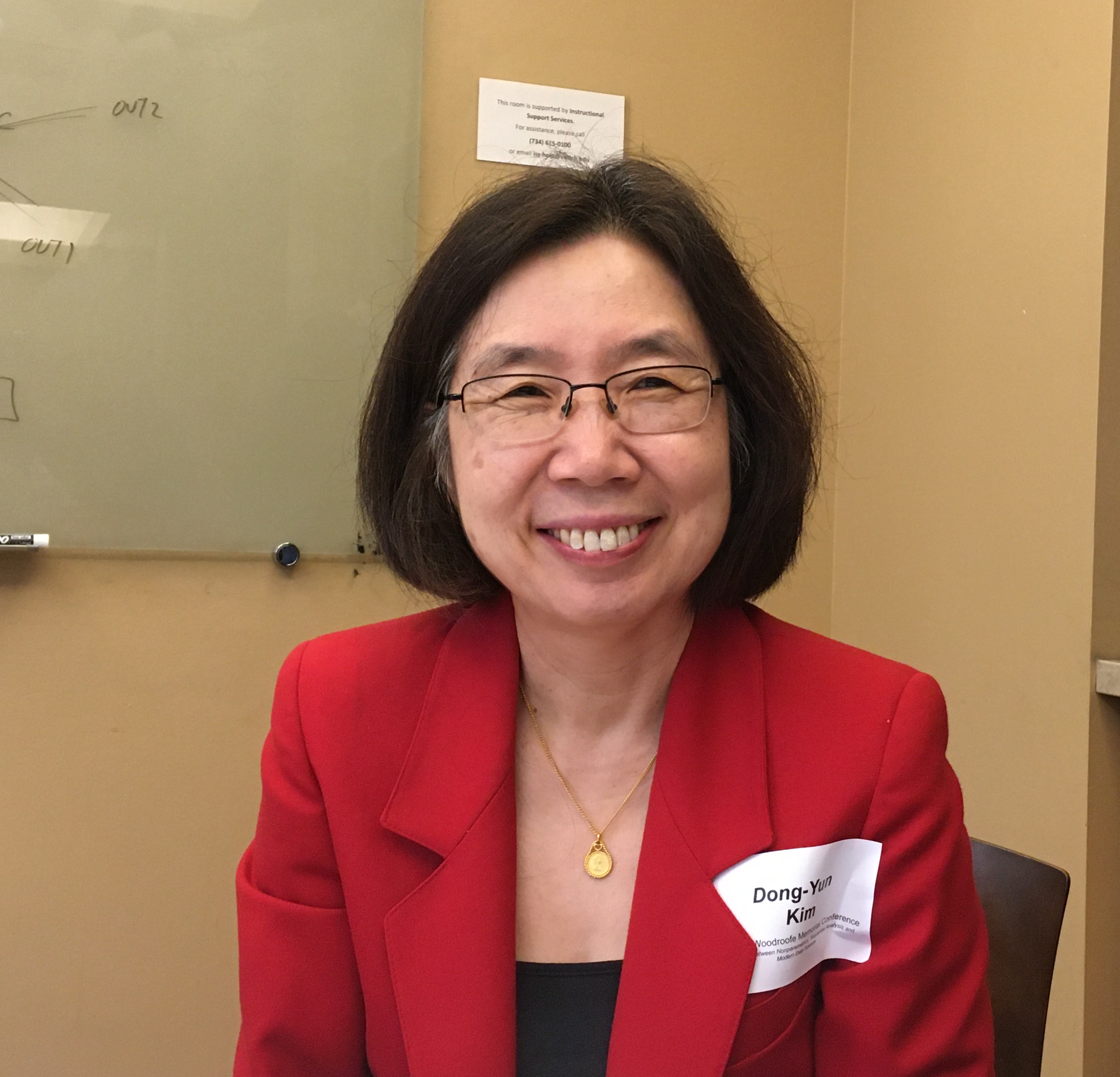
- Dong-Yun Kim in 2023
- Scientific career
- Fields: Biostatistics
- Institutions: Illinois State University; Virginia Tech; National Heart, Lung, and Blood Institute

Dong-Yun Kim is a biostatistician whose research involves clinical trials, change detection, and statistical genetics. She works as a mathematical statistician in the Office of Biostatistics Research of the National Heart, Lung, and Blood Institute, and is the 2023 president of the Caucus for Women in Statistics.

== Education and career ==
Kim earned her Ph.D. from the University of Michigan in 2003. Her dissertation, Sequential Test and Change Point Problems with Staggered Entry, was supervised by Michael Woodroofe.

She joined Illinois State University as an assistant professor of mathematics in 2003, and moved to Virginia Tech as an assistant professor of statistics in 2007. She took her present position in the National Institutes of Health, as a mathematical statistician in the Office of Biostatistics Research of the National Heart, Lung, and Blood Institute, in 2013.

== Professional service ==
Kim was elected as president of the Caucus for Women in Statistic and Data Science (CWS) for the 2023 term. She also serves on the board of directors of the Korean International Statistical Society.

== Recognition ==
Kim was a 2022 recipient of an achievement award from Korean Women Scientists and Engineers, recognizing her "commitment to developing collaboration and communication between Korean women scientists in South Korea and Korean-American women scientists in the US".
