= Saonli Basu =

Indian-American statistical geneticist

Saonli Basu is an Indian and American statistical geneticist. She is a professor in the Division of Biostatistics & Health Data Science of the University of Minnesota School of Public Health, the founding director of the University of Minnesota Genomic Data Commons, and co-director of the analytics core in the Masonic Institute for the Developing Brain. Her research involves the use of longitudinal family studies and nonparametric statistics to study the genetics of complex traits and the interactions of the genome with the environment.

== Education and career ==
Basu has a 1996 bachelor's degree from Presidency University, Kolkata. After a year of working as a marketing research associate, she returned to graduate study and received a 1998 master's degree from the Indian Statistical Institute in Kolkata. She completed her Ph.D. in statistics in 2005 at the University of Washington. Her doctoral dissertation, Allele-Sharing Methods for Linkage Detection Using Extended Pedigrees, was supervised by Elizabeth A. Thompson.

She joined the University of Minnesota as an assistant professor in the School of Public Health in 2005. She was promoted to associate professor in 2012 and full professor in 2019.

Basu was elected as chair of the American Statistical Association Section on Statistics in Genomics and Genetics for a term beginning in 2019.

== Recognition ==
Basu was elected as a Fellow of the American Statistical Association in 2017.
