= Shili Lin =

Statistics professor

- Education: University of Washington
- Scientific career
- Workplaces: Ohio State University
- Thesis: Markov Chain Monte Carlo Estimates Of Probabilities On Complex Structures (1993)
- Doctoral advisor: Elizabeth A. Thompson

Shili Lin is a statistician who studies the applications of statistics to genomic data. She is a professor of statistics at Ohio State University, and is president-elect of the Caucus for Women in Statistics.

Lin earned her Ph.D. in 1993 from the University of Washington. Her dissertation, supervised by Elizabeth A. Thompson, was Markov Chain Monte Carlo Estimates Of Probabilities On Complex Structures. After working as a Neyman Visiting Assistant Professor at the University of California, Berkeley, she joined the Ohio State faculty in 1995.

She has been a fellow of the American Statistical Association since 2004, and a fellow of the American Association for the Advancement of Science since 2009.
