= Susmita Datta =

Indian biostatistician

Susmita Datta is an Indian biostatistician. She is a professor of biostatistics at the University of Florida, and is the former president of the Caucus for Women in Statistics. She is also a musician who has published three CDs of Bengali folk songs.

== Education ==
Datta did her undergraduate studies in physics at the University of Calcutta, earning a bachelor's degree there in 1986. She began a master's program in physics at Michigan State University, and was led to statistics both by a probability course she took there and by the better job prospects for graduates in statistics. Having to move to the University of Georgia because of family reasons, she earned a master's degree in applied statistics there in 1990 and then a Ph.D. in statistics in 1995. Her dissertation, supervised by Jonathan Arnold, was Dynamics of Cytonuclear Disequilibria and Related Statistical Tests for The Neutrality of Mitochondrial DNA markers for Hybrid Zone Data.

== Career ==
After postdoctoral research at Emory University, Datta joined the Georgia State University faculty in 1997. In 2005 she moved to the University of Louisville. There she became Graduate Program Director for Bioinformatics and Biostatistics in 2012, and Distinguished University Scholar in 2013. In 2015 she moved again, to the University of Florida, as part of a hiring initiative there for researchers in metabolomics.

She served as president of the Caucus for Women in Statistics in 2013.

== Recognition ==
Datta was elected to the International Statistical Institute in 2010. In 2012, she became a Fellow of the American Statistical Association, and in 2014 she was elected as a fellow of the American Association for the Advancement of Science "for her distinguished contributions to methodological and collaborative research in bioinformatics, computational biology, and biostatistics, and for student training and promoting women in STEM fields".
