= Eileen Boardman =

American statistician and solar energy scientist

Eileen Clement Boardman (c. 1942 – October 11, 2018) was an American statistician and solar energy scientist whose research included the use of statistical principles in measuring the performance of solar energy systems. She was the first woman to earn a doctorate in mechanical engineering from Colorado State University, and served as president of the Caucus for Women in Statistics.

== Life and career ==
Boardman was born c. 1942, and grew up in Pennsylvania. She earned a bachelor's degree from Bucknell University, and a master's degree from Rutgers University.

She was affiliated with the department of statistics at Colorado State University beginning in the early 1970s, and became an instructor for their introductory statistics courses in the 1970s and 1980s, also teaching in mechanical engineering and business. Returning to graduate study, she completed a doctorate in mechanical engineering from Colorado State University in 1986, with a dissertation applying statistical quality measures to solar power. She became the first woman at Colorado State to earn this degree. After completing her doctorate, she became a statistical consultant, naming her firm Boardman Associates.

She survived a bout of breast cancer in 2004, and died on October 11, 2018, of pancreatic cancer.

== Recognition and legacy ==
Boardman became president of the Caucus for Women in Statistics for 1982.

Colorado State University maintains a student award named for Boardman, the Thomas J. and Eileen C. Boardman Statistical Consulting Award.
