= Nancy E. Heckman =

Canadian statistician

Nancy E. Heckman is a Canadian statistician, interested in nonparametric regression, smoothing, functional data analysis, and applications of statistics in evolutionary biology. From 2008 to 2018, she served as head of the statistics department at the University of British Columbia.

Heckman earned her PhD in 1982 from the University of Michigan. Her dissertation, supervised by Michael B. Woodroofe, was Two Treatment Comparison with Random Allocation Rule.

Heckman's publications won The Canadian Journal of Statistics Best Paper Award three times, in 1998, 2001, and 2023. She is a fellow of the American Statistical Association and Institute of Mathematical Statistics, and an elected member of the International Statistical Institute. In 2024, she received an honorary membership in the Statistical Society of Canada.
