= Paula Roberson =

Biostatistician

Paula Karen Roberson is a biostatistician at the University of Arkansas for Medical Sciences, where she chairs the department of biostatistics. Her research interests include the design of clinical trials, nonparametric statistics, and feature selection. She was president of the Caucus for Women in Statistics in 2015.

== Education and career ==
Roberson graduated from Southern Methodist University in 1974 with a bachelor's degree in mathematics and statistics. She completed her Ph.D. in biomathematics at the University of Washington in 1979. Her dissertation, Distributional and Robustness Problems in Time-Space Disease Clustering, was supervised by Lloyd Fisher. She joined the University of Arkansas faculty in 1993, and became the founding chair of the biostatistics department there in 2004.

== Recognition ==
Roberson became a Fellow of the American Statistical Association in 2000. In 2014, she was elected as a Fellow of the American Association for the Advancement of Science. In 2022 Roberson was recipient of the American Statistical Association's Founders Award.
