= Nairanjana Dasgupta =

Indian-American statistician

Nairanjana (Jan) Dasgupta is an Indian statistician at Washington State University, where she is Boeing Distinguished Professor in Mathematics and Statistics. Her research interests include large-scale multiple testing in bioinformatics, as well as applications involving nutrition and lactation, and the growth of apples.

== Education and career ==
Dasgupta graduated from Presidency College, Kolkata in 1990, with a bachelor's degree in statistics and minors in mathematics and economics. She went to the University of South Carolina for graduate study in statistics. She earned a master's degree in 1994 with a thesis supervised by Stephen Durham on hyperfinite probability theory and completed her Ph.D. in 1996. Her doctoral advisor was John Spurrier, and her dissertation, on logistic regression, was Comparison to control in logistic regression.

She joined the statistics faculty at Washington State University in 1996 and became the director of the newly established Center of Interdisciplinary Statistics Education and Research there in 2015.

== Recognition ==
Dasgupta was named Boeing Distinguished Professor of Math and Science Education at Washington State University in 2017. In 2018, she was named a Fellow of the American Statistical Association. She is the 2022 president of the Caucus for Women in Statistics and the 2026 JEDI Outreach Group chair-elect.
