= TENA (disambiguation) =

TENA may refer to:

- TENA, a brand of incontinence products for adults and teenagers
- Test and Training Enabling Architecture (TENA), United States Department of Defense software architecture

== See also ==
- Tena (disambiguation)
