= Martha Clare Morris =

American nutritional epidemiologist (1955–2020)

- Born: Martha Clare Chinn; 1955
- Died: February 15, 2020 (aged 64); Oak Park, Illinois, U.S.
- Education: University of Iowa; Harvard T.H. Chan School of Public Health
- Known for: MIND diet
- Scientific career
- Workplaces: University of Iowa; Rush University Medical Center
- Thesis: (1992)

Martha Clare Morris (1955 – February 15, 2020) was an American nutritional epidemiologist who studied the link between diet and Alzheimer's disease. She led a team of researchers at the Rush University Medical Center to develop the MIND diet.

== Early life and education ==
Martha Clare Chinn grew up in Flossmoor, Illinois. She graduated from Homewood Flossmoor High School. She completed an undergraduate degree at the University of Iowa, followed by a master of sociology at the same university. She undertook her doctoral studies at the Harvard T.H. Chan School of Public Health, graduating with an ScD.

== Career ==
Morris worked with Denis Evans while completing her ScD and, in 1992, moved to Rush University Medical Center in Chicago with him. On Evans' retirement some years later, Morris became director of the Institute for Healthy Aging at Rush.

Her research focused on diet, rather than just genetics, being a significant contributor to dementia, in particular Alzheimer's disease. Leading a team of researchers at Rush, she developed the Mediterranean-DASH Intervention for Neurodegenerative Delay diet, commonly known as the MIND diet.

Morris died of cancer at her Oak Park home on February 15, 2020.

== Works ==
=== Book ===
- Diet for the MIND: The Latest Science on What to Eat to Prevent Alzheimer's and Cognitive Decline, 2017 ISBN 978-0316441155

=== Selected journal articles ===
- Martha Clare Morris; Christy C Tangney; Yamin Wang; Frank M Sacks; David A Bennett; Neelum T Aggarwal (11 February 2015). "MIND diet associated with reduced incidence of Alzheimer's disease". Alzheimer's and Dementia. 11 (9): 1007–1014. doi:10.1016/j.jalz.2014.11.009. ISSN 1552-5260. PMC 4532650. PMID 25681666. Wikidata Q34462761.
- Martha Clare Morris; Christy C Tangney; Yamin Wang; Frank M Sacks; Lisa L Barnes; David A Bennett; Neelum T Aggarwal (15 June 2015). "MIND diet slows cognitive decline with aging". Alzheimer's and Dementia. 11 (9): 1015–1022. doi:10.1016/j.jalz.2015.04.011. ISSN 1552-5260. PMC 4581900. PMID 26086182. Wikidata Q34481228.
- Martha Clare Morris; John Brockman; Julie A Schneider; Yamin Wang; David A Bennett; Christy C. Tangney; Ondine van de Rest (1 February 2016). "Association of Seafood Consumption, Brain Mercury Level, and APOE ε4 Status With Brain Neuropathology in Older Adults". JAMA. 315 (5): 489–497. doi:10.1001/jama.2015.19451. ISSN 0098-7484. PMC 5460535. PMID 26836731. Wikidata Q33768448.
- Martha Clare Morris (1 March 2016). "Nutrition and risk of dementia: overview and methodological issues". Annals of the New York Academy of Sciences. 1367 (1): 31–37. doi:10.1111/nyas.13047. ISSN 0077-8923. PMC 4849169. PMID 27116239. Wikidata Q36847569.
- Thomas M Holland; Puja Agarwal; Yamin Wang; Sue E. Leurgans; David A Bennett; Sarah L Booth; Martha Clare Morris (29 January 2020). "Dietary flavonols and risk of Alzheimer dementia". Neurology. 94 (16): e1749–e1756. doi:10.1212/wnl.0000000000008981. ISSN 1526-632X. PMC 7282875. PMID 31996451. Wikidata Q93037700.
- Klodian Dhana; Denis A Evans; Kumar B Rajan; David A Bennett; Martha C Morris (17 June 2020). "Healthy lifestyle and the risk of Alzheimer dementia: Findings from 2 longitudinal studies". Neurology. doi:10.1212/wnl.0000000000009816. ISSN 1526-632X. PMC 7455318. PMID 32554763. Wikidata Q96591377.
