= Marcia Ciol =

Brazilian-American medical statistician

Márcia Aparecida Ciol is a Brazilian-American medical statistician and biostatistician known for her research on comorbidity. She works as a research associate professor in the University of Washington's Department of Rehabilitation Medicine, maintains an affiliation with the Center for Brazilian Studies at the University of Washington Tacoma, and is a past president of the Caucus for Women in Statistics.

Ciol earned bachelor's and master's degrees in statistics from the University of Campinas in 1979 and 1982 respectively. She earned a second master's degree in biostatistics from the University of Washington in 1987, and completed her Ph.D. at the University of Washington in 1991. Her dissertation, An Adaptive Case-Cohort Design, was supervised by Steven Self.
