= Jeanne E. Griffith =

American statistician (1950–2001)

Jeanne Elaine Griffith
- Born: 1950
- Died: August 3, 2001 (aged 50–51); Arlington, Virginia
- Education: College of William and Mary; University of Pennsylvania; George Washington University
- Known for: Mentoring within the Federal Statistical System of the United States
- Awards: Roger Herriot Award, 2001; Jeanne E. Griffith Mentoring Award of the American Statistical Association is named in her honor.
- Scientific career
- Fields: Statistics
- Workplaces: National Science Foundation

Jeanne Elaine Griffith (1950- August 3, 2001) was the director of the Division of Science Resource Studies at the National Science Foundation. She was known throughout her career as a supporter and mentor of junior staff in the Federal Statistical System of the United States.

== Education ==
Griffith received a B.A. in sociology from the College of William and Mary, a master's degree in sociology from the University of Pennsylvania and a Master's in applied statistics from George Washington University.

== Career ==
Griffith started her career at the U.S. Census Bureau, Fairfax County's Office of Research and Statistics, the Health, Education and Welfare Department and the Office of Management and Budget.

She worked 25 years in the Federal Statistical System of the United States. Throughout her career, one of Griffith's highest priorities was to mentor and encourage younger staff at all levels to grow and seize career opportunities when they came along. Griffith served in many positions in the federal government, including the director of the Division of Science Resources Studies at the National Science Foundation and acting commissioner and associate commissioner for data development and longitudinal studies at the National Center for Education Statistics. In June 2001, she received the Roger Herriot Award for Innovation in Federal Statistics.

Griffith's primary contribution was improving the collection and dissemination of education statistics. Her efforts touched on the fields of education statistics, social demography, aging and retirement, labor force, and income and poverty

She died of breast cancer in August 2001.

== Jeanne E. Griffith Mentoring Award ==
The Jeanne E. Griffith Mentoring Award was established in her honor in 2002. The award is managed by the Government Statistics Section of the American Statistical Association. Previous recipients of the Jean E. Griffith Mentoring Award are:

2003 - Richard D. Allen (National Agricultural Statistics Service)
2004 - Beth A Kilss (Internal Revenue Service)
2005 - Renee Miller (Energy Information Administration)
2006 - Martin O'Connell (U.S. Census Bureau)
2007 - Stephanie Shipp (National Institute of Standards and Technology)
2008 - Rosemary Marcuss (Bureau of Economic Analysis)
2009 - Kevin Cecco (Internal Revenue Service) and Lillian Lin (Centers for Disease Control and Prevention)
2010 - Deborah H. Griffin (U.S. Census Bureau)
2011 - Jenise L. Swall (U.S. Environmental Protection Agency)
2012 - William P. Mockovak (Bureau of Labor Statistics)
2013 - Brian Harris-Kojetin (Office of Management and Budget)
2014 - J. Gregory Robinson (U.S. Census Bureau) and Kenneth C. Schoendorf (National Center for Health Statistics)
2015 - Aldo "Skip" Vecchia (U.S. Geological Survey)
2016 - Diane L Willimack (U.S. Census Bureau)
2017 - Cynthia Ogden (National Center for Health Statistics)
