= MIND diet =

Diet intended to delay neurodegeneration

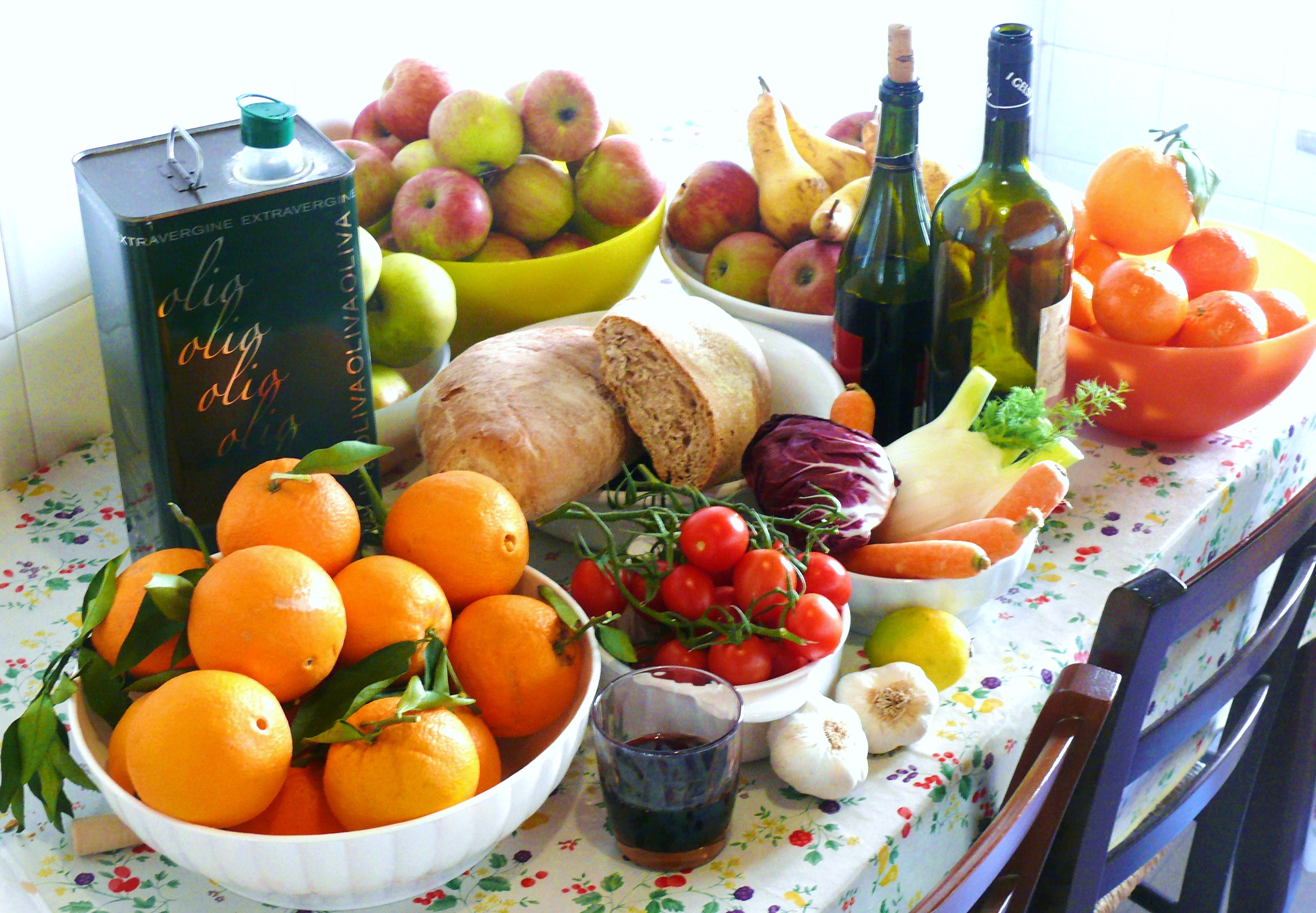
Some of the products that make up the Mediterranean diet

The Mediterranean-DASH Intervention for Neurodegenerative Delay diet, or more commonly, the MIND diet, combines portions of the DASH (Dietary Approaches to Stop Hypertension) diet and the Mediterranean diet. Both the DASH diet and the Mediterranean diet have been shown to improve cognition. A team at Rush University Medical Center, including Martha Clare Morris (a nutritional epidemiologist), worked to create the MIND diet.

Like the DASH and Mediterranean diets, the MIND diet emphasizes the intake of fresh fruit, vegetables, and legumes. The MIND diet may be more effective at reducing cognitive decline than either the Mediterranean or the DASH diet alone, although a cause and effect relationship has not been determined.

== Background and development ==
Various diets, including the Mediterranean and DASH, have been investigated with relation to cognitive decline. Neither the Mediterranean nor DASH diets were specifically developed to slow cognitive decline. In an effort to develop a diet specifically for limiting cognitive decline, components of the Mediterranean and DASH diets were combined. The MIND diet was developed from studies in an aging project, but a cause and effect relationship between the diet and cognitive decline could not be determined.

== Research ==
The MIND diet was published in 2015. Changes in cognitive ability were correlated with specific nutritional components of the MIND diet. The inclusion of higher numbers of MIND diet recommended foods in one's daily diet was associated with less cognitive decline than when these foods were not included or were included in lesser quantities. A follow-up study compared the effectiveness of the MIND diet to that of the Mediterranean and DASH diets within the same study population. The study showed that all the diets have potential to inhibit cognitive decline when they are strictly followed. Although the MIND diet shows promising results, the findings must be replicated in other population based studies to confirm these conclusions.

When designing diets for the prevention of certain diseases, it is necessary to know the impacts of individual nutrients on the human body. The MIND diet could be improved by future research which investigates the impacts of individual nutrients or foods on neuronal physiology and anatomy. It is also beneficial to use dietary measurements that are culturally appropriate to enable researchers, dietitians, and the general public to draw accurate conclusions from the data.

== Recommendations ==
The MIND diet recommends:

- Whole grains: three or more servings a day
- Green leafy vegetables (kale, collards, greens; spinach; lettuce/tossed salad): at least six servings a week
- Other vegetables (green/red peppers, squash, cooked carrots, raw carrots, broccoli, celery, potatoes, peas or lima beans, tomatoes, tomato sauce, string beans, beets, corn, zucchini/summer squash/eggplant, coleslaw, potato salad): at least one a day
- Wine: one glass a day
- Nuts: five servings a week
- Beans and lentils: at least three servings a week
- Berries: two or more servings a week
- Non-fried poultry (like chicken or turkey): two times a week
- Non-fried Fish: once a week
- Olive oil: use it as your main cooking oil.

The diet discourages:

- Butter and stick margarine: more than a tablespoon daily
- Pastries and sweets: more than five servings a week
- Red meat and pork: more than four servings a week
- Cheese: more than one serving a week
- Fried or fast food (like French fries, chicken nuggets): more than one serving a week

== See also ==
- List of diets
