= Mary Batcher =

American statistician

Mary Katherine Batcher is an American statistician who chairs the National Institute of Statistical Sciences.

== Education and career ==
Batcher earned bachelor's, master's, and doctoral degrees at the University of Maryland, College Park. She worked as a statistician in the National Center for Education Statistics, and became Chief of Statistical Support in the Statistics of Income Division of the Internal Revenue Service.

She worked for 18 years at Ernst & Young before retiring. At Ernst & Young, she worked on tax applications of statistical sampling, and became executive director of quantitative economics and statistics. She joined the board of trustees of the National Institute of Statistical Sciences in 2013, and became chair in 2015. She is also the founder of consulting firm BDS Data Analytics.

== Recognition ==
In 2003, Batcher was elected as a Fellow of the American Statistical Association. She is also an Elected Member of the International Statistical Institute. In 2012 she won the American Statistical Association Founders Award.

Batcher was president of the Caucus for Women in Statistics for the 1995 term. She was president of the Washington Statistical Society for 1999–2000.
