= Cynthia Clark =

American statistician

Cynthia Clark FRSS
- Born: Cynthia Zang Facer; April 1, 1942 (age 84)
- Education: Mills College; University of Denver; Iowa State University (PhD)
- Spouse: Glenn Willett Clark (m. 1963)
- Children: 6
- Awards: Presidential Meritorious Rank Award (2011)
- Scientific career
- Fields: Statistics
- Thesis: Convergence and ergodicity for conditional distributions: theory and applications (1977)
- Doctoral advisor: Herbert T. David

Cynthia Zang Facer Clark FRSS (born April 1, 1942) is an American statistician known for her work improving the quality of data in the federal statistical system, and especially in the National Agricultural Statistics Service. She has also served as the president of the Caucus for Women in Statistics and the Washington Statistical Society. As of 2018 she is executive director of the Council of Professional Associations on Federal Statistics.

== Early life and education ==
Clark was born on April 1, 1942, the daughter of banker Joseph Elmer Facer and his wife Flora Burnell Zang Facer. She grew up in Colorado, and was part of the class of 1960 at East High School in Denver. She graduated in 1963 from Mills College, where she majored in mathematics, and in the same year married Glenn Willett Clark, with whom she had six children. She earned a master's degree from the University of Denver in 1964.

She came to Iowa State University planning to continue in pure mathematics, but completed her Ph.D. there in 1977 in statistics. Her dissertation was titled Convergence and ergodicity for conditional distributions: theory and applications, and was supervised by Herbert T. David.

== Career ==
In the late 1970s and early 1980s, Clark worked at the Office of Federal Statistical Policy and its successor agency, the Office of Management and Budget. She joined the National Agricultural Statistics Service in 1990, and created the Agricultural Resource Management Survey there. She was associate director for methodology and standards at the United States Census Bureau from 1996 to 2004.

After three years in England as executive director for methodology and quality in the Office for National Statistics from 2004 to 2007, she returned to the National Agricultural Statistics Service in 2008 as its administrator. After six years as administrator, she retired from federal service in 2014.

Since December 2018 she has been the executive director of the Council of Professional Associations on Federal Statistics.

== Service ==
Clark served as president of the Caucus for Women in Statistics in 1989, and chaired the Committee on Women in Statistics of the International Statistical Institute from 2003 until 2011. She has also chaired the Government Statistics Section of the American Statistical Association, and was president of the Washington Statistical Society for the 2000–2001 term.

On her retirement, Clark and her husband served a mission to the Nauvoo Illinois Temple of the Church of Jesus Christ of Latter-day Saints.

== Recognition ==
In 1997, Clark was elected as a Fellow of the American Statistical Association. She is also an elected member of the International Statistical Institute, and a fellow of the Royal Statistical Society.

Clark was given a Presidential Meritorious Rank Award in 2011. The Iowa State University Alumni Association gave her their Distinguished Alumni Award in 2014.
