= Elizabeth A. Thompson =

British-born American statistician

Elizabeth Thompson FRS
- Born: Elizabeth Alison Thompson; May 22, 1949 (age 77)
- Education: Newnham College, Cambridge
- Scientific career
- Workplaces: King's College, Cambridge; University of Washington
- Doctoral advisor: A. W. F. Edwards
- Doctoral students: Mariza de Andrade; Saonli Basu; Sharon R. Browning; Shili Lin

Elizabeth Alison Thompson FRS (born May 22, 1949) is a British-born American statistician at the University of Washington. Her research concerns the use of genetic data to infer relationships between individuals and populations. She was the 2017–2018 president of the International Biometric Society.

== Education and career ==
Thompson studied at Newnham College, Cambridge, earning first-class honours in the mathematical tripos in 1970 and completing a diploma in mathematical statistics in 1971. She continued at Cambridge for graduate studies, earning a Ph.D. in statistics in 1974 under the supervision of A. W. F. Edwards.

After postdoctoral studies at Stanford University she returned to Cambridge as a lecturer in mathematics and mathematical statistics and fellow of King's College, Cambridge. She became a fellow of Newnham in 1981. She moved to the Department of Statistics at the University of Washington in 1985, and added a joint appointment to the Department of Biostatistics in 1988. She became a U.S. citizen in 1997.

== Awards and honors ==
Thompson was awarded the degree of Doctor of Science (ScD) by Cambridge University in 1988 based on her published work, and became an honorary fellow of Newnham in 2013.

She became a fellow of the American Academy of Arts and Sciences in 1998. In 2008 she joined the National Academy of Sciences. She was elected a Fellow of the Royal Society in 2023.

She is the Carnegie Centenary Professor for 2017 at the University of St Andrews.

== Selected publications ==
- Cannings, C.; Thompson, E. A.; Skolnick, M. H. (1978), "Probability functions on complex pedigrees", Advances in Applied Probability, 10 (1): 26–61, doi:10.1017/s0001867800029475
- Guo, Sun Wei; Thompson, Elizabeth A. (1992), "Performing the exact test of Hardy–Weinberg proportion for multiple alleles", Biometrics, 48 (2): 361–372, doi:10.2307/2532296, JSTOR 2532296, PMID 1637966
- Geyer, Charles J.; Thompson, Elizabeth A. (1992), "Constrained Monte Carlo maximum likelihood for dependent data", Journal of the Royal Statistical Society, Series B (Methodological), 54 (3): 657–699, doi:10.1111/j.2517-6161.1992.tb01443.x, JSTOR 2345852
- Geyer, Charles J.; Thompson, Elizabeth A. (1995), "Annealing Markov chain Monte Carlo with applications to ancestral inference", Journal of the American Statistical Association, 90 (431): 909–920, Bibcode:1995JASA...90..909G, doi:10.1080/01621459.1995.10476590, hdl:11299/199610
- Anderson, E. C.; Thompson, E. A. (2002), "A model-based method for identifying species hybrids using multilocus genetic data", Genetics, 160 (3): 1217–1229, doi:10.1093/genetics/160.3.1217, PMC 1462008, PMID 11901135
