= Elizabeth Margosches =

American statistician

Elizabeth Helen Margosches is an American statistician who worked on risk assessment for the United States Environmental Protection Agency.

== Education and career ==
Margosches graduated from Bryn Mawr College in 1969. After earning a master's degree at Rutgers University, she earned a second master's degree in public health at the University of Michigan in 1975. She completed her Ph.D. in biostatistics at Michigan in 1980; her dissertation was Nonparametric Tolerance Intervals For Sequential Monitoring.

She joined the Environmental Protection Agency in 1980, after completing her doctorate.

== Service ==
Margosches was president of the Caucus for Women in Statistics for the 1998 term, and chaired the Committee on Women in Statistics of the American Statistical Association in 2005.

== Recognition ==
In 2007, Margosches was elected as a Fellow of the American Statistical Association "for significant impact on scientific policy issues at the Environmental Protection Agency; for recruitment and mentoring of women in government agencies; and for exemplary service to the profession".
