= Pál Révész =

Hungarian mathematician (1934–2022)

Pál Révész (6 June 1934 – 14 November 2022), anglicized as Pal Revesz, was a Hungarian mathematician known for his research in probability and mathematical statistics, including the mathematical foundations of the law of large numbers, theory of density estimation, and random walks.

== Education and career ==
Révész was born in Budapest. He studied in the applied mathematics program at the Faculty of Science, Eötvös Loránd University and graduated there in 1957. Afterwards, he got a job at the Eötvös Loránd University's probability department, where he worked as an assistant professor. In 1964, he transferred to the Mathematical Research Institute of the Hungarian Academy of Sciences, where he started working as a scientific associate. In 1963, he defended his candidate's thesis in mathematics, and in 1969 he defended his academic doctoral thesis. He became a member of the Mathematical Committee of the Hungarian Academy of Sciences. He did a significant part of his scientific work here. He was elected a corresponding member of the Hungarian Academy of Sciences in 1982, and a full member in 1987. In 1985, he received a second position as a university professor at the Vienna University of Technology. He left the research institute in 1987, when he was appointed professor at the Institute of Mathematics of the Budapest University of Technology. In Vienna, he also headed the Department of Statistics and Probability, from where he retired in 1998. Between 1999 and 2005, he was the deputy chairman of the Mathematics Department. Meanwhile, he also worked in the Committee on International Relations.

Révész became a member of the Academia Europaea in London in 1991. In addition to his academic duties, he also contributed to the management of several scientific societies: from 1981 to 1983 he was the president of the Bernoulli Society of the International Statistical Institute. Between 1995 and 1997, he held the position of acting president of the János Bolyai Mathematical Society.

== Academic research ==
Révész's main research areas were probability and mathematical statistics. His results related to the so-called strong approximation of stochastic processes and the estimation of the probability density function are significant. He also dealt with statistical applications of the stochastic approximation method. He was the first to provide a method for estimating the regression function that is suitable for simultaneous estimation of all points of the function. He was a close collaborator of Paul Erdős.

== Honors and awards ==
Révész received the State Award of the People's Republic of Hungary in 1978 for his achievements in probability, especially in the theory of stochastic processes and their practical application. He was an honorary professor at Carleton University and the University of Szeged.

== Bibliography ==
- Révész, Pál; Birnbaum, Z. W; Lukacs, E. (1967). The Laws of Large Numbers. Burlington: Academic Press/Elsevier Science. ISBN 978-1-4832-6902-3. OCLC 898769150.
- Gaenssler, Peter; Révész, Pál, eds. (1976). Empirical Distributions and Processes. Lecture Notes in Mathematics. Vol. 566. Berlin, Heidelberg: Springer Berlin Heidelberg. doi:10.1007/bfb0096874. ISBN 978-3-540-08061-9.
- Csörgö, M.; Révész, P. (1981). Strong Approximations in Probability and Statistics. New York: Academic Press. ISBN 978-1-4832-6804-0. OCLC 898772113.
- Révész, Pál (1984). Mennyire véletlen a véletlen? (in Hungarian). Akadémiai Kiadó. ISBN 978-963-05-3514-4.
- Révész, Pál; Sarkadi, K.; Sen, Pranab Kumar, eds. (1987). Goodness-of-fit. Colloquium on Goodness of Fit. Amsterdam: North-Holland Pub. Co. ISBN 0-444-70087-0. OCLC 23214723.
- Révész, Pál (1994). Random walks of infinitely many particles. Singapore: World Scientific. ISBN 978-981-4350-24-2. OCLC 841809817.
- Révész, Pál (2013). Random walk in random and non-random environments (3rd ed.). New Jersey: World Scientific. ISBN 978-981-4447-51-5. OCLC 842932677.
