= Jennifer Madans =

American biostatistician

Jennifer Holly Madans is an American biostatistician whose research has concerned survey methodology, longitudinal studies, the measurement of health and functionality, and health services, as well as participation in studies on racial disparities in health statistics data, body mass, diabetes, infant mortality, and disability. Formerly the associate director and acting director of the National Center for Health Statistics in the Centers for Disease Control and Prevention, she is a senior advisor to the Center for Inclusive Policy and vice chair of the Population Reference Bureau.

== Education and career ==
Madans was an undergraduate at Bard College. She went to the University of Michigan for graduate study in sociology, earning a master's degree and Ph.D. there.

She was a postdoctoral researcher in epidemiology at Yale University before joining the National Center for Health Statistics, where she became associate director in 1996. She has also been affiliated with Georgetown University as adjunct faculty in biostatistics and epidemiology and in demography. She served as acting director of the National Center for Health Statistics from 2018 to 2020, before retiring in 2021.

== Recognition ==
Madans was elected as a Fellow of the American Statistical Association in 2002, and is an Elected Member of the International Statistical Institute.

She was the 2004 Morris Hansen Lecturer of the Washington Statistical Society, and the 2015 winner of the Roger Herriot Award for Innovation in Federal Statistics, jointly sponsored by the American Statistical Association Section on Social Statistics, Section on Government Statistics, and the Washington Statistical Society. In 2016, the Population Association of America gave her their Excellence in Public Service Award.
