= Donna Brogan =

American statistician, biostatistical researcher

- Born: July 12, 1939 (age 87); Baltimore, Maryland
- Other name: Donna Ruhl Brogan
- Education: Gettysburg College; Purdue University; Iowa State University
- Scientific career
- Fields: Statistics
- Workplaces: Emory University
- Doctoral advisor: Joseph Sedransk

Donna Jean Brogan (born July 12, 1939) is an American statistician and professor emeritus of statistics at Emory University. Brogan has worked in biostatistical research in the areas of women's health, mental health and psychosocial health statistics, statistics on breast cancer, and analysis of complex survey data.

== Early life and education ==
Brogan was born July 12, 1939, and grew up in a working-class neighborhood in Baltimore, Maryland, and she was the first in her family to go to college. She earned a B.A. in mathematics from Gettysburg College in 1960, an M.S. in statistics from Purdue University in 1962. She earned a PhD in statistics from Iowa State University in 1967, under the supervision of Joseph Sendransk.

== Work ==
In 1971, Brogan founded the Caucus for Women in Statistics, and helped to establish the standing ASA Committee on Women in Statistics.

For four years, she was an assistant professor in the University of North Carolina in the School of Public Health, with a specialization in sample survey design and analysis. Then in 1970, she joined the Emory University School of Medicine as associate professor, later professor in the Department of Statistics and Biometry. Between 1991 and 1994, she was the division director of biostatistics at Emory. She retired in 2004 from Emory University.

Since 1975, she has worked in freelance and active as a biostatistician, primarily in the specialty area of design and analysis of complex sample surveys.

== Personal life ==
As a woman in mathematics in the 1950s and 1960s, she suffered from many incidents of sex discrimination, including issues with unequal compensation from the University of North Carolina Chapel Hill and Emory University, as well as a legal battle with the DeKalb County voter registrar, which involved the American Civil Liberties Union.

She was married to Charles Ruhl, and had two children, although their son died in infancy. Brogan and Ruhl later divorced, and Brogan lived as a single mother for several years.

== Awards and honors ==
She is a Fellow of the American Statistical Association, received the Emory University Thomas Jefferson Award from Emory University in 1993, and was awarded the Iowa State University Distinguished Alumni Award in 2002. In 1995, Iowa State University engraved her name on its Plaza of Heroines, which honors outstanding women graduates and faculty.

The "Donna J. Brogan Lecture in Biostatistics" was established in 2004 at Emory University, to honor Brogan's work at the school.

== Selected publications ==
=== Journal articles ===
- Brogan, Donna; Kutner, Nancy G. (February 1976). "Measuring sex-role orientation: A normative approach". Journal of Marriage and the Family. 38 (1): 31–40. doi:10.2307/350548. JSTOR 350548.
- Goodman, Sherryl H.; Brogan, Donna; Lynch, Mary Ellen; Fielding, Brook (1993). "Social and emotional competence in children of depressed mothers". Child Development. 64 (2). doi:10.1111/j.1467-8624.1993.tb02925.x. JSTOR 1131266.
- Frank, Erica; Brogan, Donna; Schiffman, Melissa (February 1998). "Prevalence and correlates of harassment among US women physicians". Archives of Internal Medicine. 158 (4): 352. doi:10.1001/archinte.158.4.352.
- Biehler, Gayle S.; Brown, G. Gorgon; Williams, Rick L.; Brogan, Donna (2010). "Estimating model-adjusted risks, risk differences, and risk ratios from complex survey data". American Journal of Epidemiology. 171 (5). doi:10.1093/aje/kwp440.

=== Book ===
- Slome, Cecil; Brogan, Donna; Eyres, Sandra; Lednar, Wayne (1982). Basic Epidemiological Methods and Biostatistics: a Workbook. Belmont, California: Wadsworth.
