= Wendy Lou =

Canadian bio-statistician and professor

Wen-Yi Wendy Lou is a Canadian biostatistician who works as a professor in the Dalla Lana School of Public Health of the University of Toronto. Her research interests include the theory of runs and patterns in sequence data and applications of statistics to health care.

== Education and career ==
Lou completed her Ph.D. in biostatistics in 1995 at the University of Toronto. Her dissertation was On runs tests for independence of binary longitudinal data using the method of finite Markov chain imbedding. She worked as a faculty member in the Mount Sinai School of Medicine, at that time affiliated with New York University, before moving back to Toronto.

== Book ==
With James C. Fu, Lou is the author of the book Distribution Theory of Runs and Patterns and Its Applications: A Finite Markov Chain Imbedding Approach (World Scientific, 2003).

== Recognition ==
Lou is the former holder of the Canada Research Chair in Statistical Methods for Health Care in the Dalla Lana School.

In 2013 Lou became a Fellow of the American Statistical Association "for her notable contributions to the distribution theory of runs and patterns, for remarkable collaborations in the biomedical and healthcare sciences, for exemplary leadership in statistical education and outstanding service to the profession".
