= Tena Katsaounis =

Greek-American statistician

Parthena (Tena) Ipsilantis Katsaounis is a Greek-American statistician interested in the factorial design of physical experiments. She is a lecturer in mathematics at The Ohio State University at Mansfield, and the former president of the Caucus for Women in Statistics.

Katsaounis earned a bachelor's degree in mathematics from the Aristotle University of Thessaloniki in 1984. She went to Ohio State University for graduate study, earning a master's degree in mathematics in 1988, a master's degree in statistics in 1996, and a Ph.D. in statistics in 2006. Her dissertation, Equivalence of symmetric factorial designs and characterization and ranking of two-level Split-lot designs, was supervised by Angela Dean.

Katsaounis was president of the Caucus for Women in Statistics in 2007. She has also held leadership positions in the American Statistical Association's sections on Physical and Engineering Sciences and on Statistical Education, and organized the Section on Physical and Engineering Sciences Continuing Education component of the 2009 Joint Statistical Meetings.
