= Shirley Kallek =

American economic statistician (1926–1983)

- Born: November 23, 1926; Roselle, New Jersey, U.S.
- Died: May 20, 1983 (aged 56)
- Education: Hunter College (BEc); New York University (MA)
- Occupation: Economic statistician
- Employer: United States Census Bureau
- Organization(s): Caucus for Women in Statistics; Washington Statistical Society
- Awards: Department of Commerce Gold Medal

Shirley Kallek (November 23, 1926 in Roselle, New Jersey – May 20, 1983) was an American economic statistician known for her work at the United States Census Bureau. She was president of the Caucus for Women in Statistics and of the Washington Statistical Society.

== Biography ==
=== Early life and education ===
Kallek was born on November 23, 1926, in Roselle, New Jersey. She did her undergraduate studies at Hunter College, where she earned a bachelor's degree in 1947. She completed a master's degree in 1949 at New York University.

=== Career ===
After completing her studies, Kallek took a position as an analyst for the National Air Transportation Association, but resigned because she was paid roughly half of the salary for new male employees, and was offered only a 10% raise when she complained. She started her own consulting business in 1950, and began working for the Census Bureau in 1955.

In 1970, she became chief of the Economic Statistics and Surveys Division and chief of the Economic Censuses Staff at the Census Bureau. She was associate director for economic fields for the census from 1974 to 1983.

=== Service and later life ===
Kallek was Jewish. She became one of the founders of Temple Micah in Washington, D.C., and the temple's first treasurer. She also served as president of the Caucus for Women in Statistics in 1980, and as president of the Washington Statistical Society for 1981–1982.

She died from cancer on May 20, 1983.

== Recognition ==
Kallek was elected as a Fellow of the American Statistical Association in 1972 "for her innovative work in developing new data series, especially on minority business enterprise, and for her outstanding contribution to the improvement of existing industry statistics through effective administration and improved application of computer techniques". She won the Department of Commerce Gold Medal in 1975, and was posthumously given a presidential award for outstanding service for 1983.

For many years after her death, the Shirley Kallek Memorial Lecture was an annual component of the Research Conference of the Census Bureau. The first such lecture was given by Alan Greenspan in 1985.
