= Risk adjusted mortality rate =

Type of mortality rate

The risk adjusted mortality rate (RAMR) is a mortality rate that is adjusted for predicted risk of death. It is usually utilized to observe and/or compare the performance of certain institution(s) or person(s), e.g., hospitals or surgeons.

It can be found as:

RAMR = (Observed Mortality Rate/Predicted Mortality Rate)* Overall (Weighted) Mortality Rate

In medical science, RAMR could be a predictor of mortality that takes into account the predicted risk for a group of patients. For example, for a group of patients first we need to find the observed mortality rates for all the hospitals of interest. Then we can build/construct a model or use an existing model to predict mortality rates for each of the hospitals. It is expected that the number of patients in each hospital will be different and hence we need an overall (weighted) mortality rate for all these hospitals. Once we have the above three rates, then we can utilize the above formula to find the risk adjusted mortality rate which will reflect the actual mortality rate of a particular hospital without being biased from the observed mortality.

In the English NHS the Summary Hospital-level Mortality Indicator, the Hospital Standardised Mortality Rate and the Risk Adjusted Mortality Index are all used. The BBC produced a table in 2011 comparing mortality on various measures across all NHS acute trusts.
