= Sue Leurgans =

Biostatistician

Sue Ellen Leurgans is a biostatistician known for her work on disorders of human movement, including those caused by occupational injury and Parkinson's disease. She is a professor of neurological sciences at the Rush University Medical Center in Chicago.

Leurgans graduated in statistics from Princeton University, and earned her Ph.D. in statistics in 1978 from Stanford University. Her dissertation, Asymptotic Distribution Theory in Generalized Isotonic Regression, was supervised by Thomas W. Sager. She was a postdoctoral researcher at the University of Washington.

Leurgans is one of the authors of the 2007 revision of the Unified Parkinson's Disease Rating Scale. She was president of the Caucus for Women in Statistics in 1990. She is married to physicist Cosmas Zachos.
