= Nicole Lazar =

American, Canadian, and Israeli statistician

Nicole Alana Lazar
- Born: December 14, 1966 (age 59); Washington, D.C., USA
- Education: Tel Aviv University, Stanford University, University of Chicago
- Known for: Empirical likelihood, functional neuroimaging, model selection, history and sociology of statistics
- Awards: Fellow of the American Statistical Association, Fellow of the Institute of Mathematical Statistics
- Scientific career
- Fields: Statistics
- Workplaces: Pennsylvania State University, University of Georgia

Nicole Alana Lazar (born December 14, 1966, in Washington, D.C.) is a statistician who holds triple citizenship as an American, Canadian, and Israeli. She is a professor of statistics at Pennsylvania State University. Previously she was a professor at the University of Georgia, where she was interim Department Head of the statistics department from 2014 to 2016. Her research interests include empirical likelihood, functional neuroimaging, model selection and the history and sociology of statistics.

Lazar graduated magnum cum laude from Tel Aviv University in 1988. After earning a master's degree in statistics from Stanford University in 1993, she completed her Ph.D. in 1996 at the University of Chicago, under the supervision of Per Mykland. She joined the Carnegie Mellon University faculty in 1996, and moved to Georgia in 2004. In 2015 she became editor-in-chief of The American Statistician.

She is the author of a book, The Statistical Analysis of Functional MRI Data (Springer, 2008). One of her columns, "The Arts: Digitized, Quantified, and Analyzed", was selected for the anthology The Best Writing on Mathematics 2014.

In 2014 she was elected as a Fellow of the American Statistical Association "for foundational statistical contributions to the area of empirical likelihood; for the development of new statistical methods for the analysis of functional magnetic resonance imaging (fMRI) data; and for developing, reforming, and enhancing statistical education." In 2021 she was named a Fellow of the Institute of Mathematical Statistics.
