= Lee-Ann Hayek =

American mathematical statistician

Lee-Ann Collins Hayek is the chief mathematical statistician at the National Museum of Natural History. Her work has included studying the proportions of metals in Renaissance bronze, and the response of Pandas to vaccines.

With Martin Buzas, she is the author of Surveying Natural Populations: Quantitative Tools for Assessing Biodiversity (Cambridge University Press, 1997 & 2010).

She is a fellow of the American Statistical Association and the Royal Statistical Society.
