= Egerfarmos =

- Village (község)
- Coat of arms

- Location of Heves County in Hungary

- Location within Hungary
- Coordinates: 47°43′08″N 20°32′10″E
- Country: Hungary
- Region: Northern Hungary
- County: Heves County
- District: Füzesabony District

Government
  - Mayor: Petrik László (Ind.)

Area
  - Total: 23.8 km^{2} (9.2 sq mi)

Population (2015)
  - Total: 680
  - Density: 29/km^{2} (75/sq mi)
- Time zone: UTC+1 (CET)
  - Summer (DST): UTC+2 (CEST)
- Postal code: 3379
- Area code: 36
- Website: http://gerfarmos.hu/

Egerfarmos is a village in Heves County, Hungary.

The area is inhabited from the 13th century, the village itself is first mentioned in documents from 1261 and since then it has been inhabited intermittently.

Jews lived in the village in the 18th and 19th centuries. Beginning in 1885, the village's Jews were subordinate to the Mazkabesh community. In 1944, many Jews from the village were murdered in the Holocaust.
