= UTHealth School of Public Health =

Coordinates: 29.704818°N 95.398213°W

UTHealth Houston School of Public Health
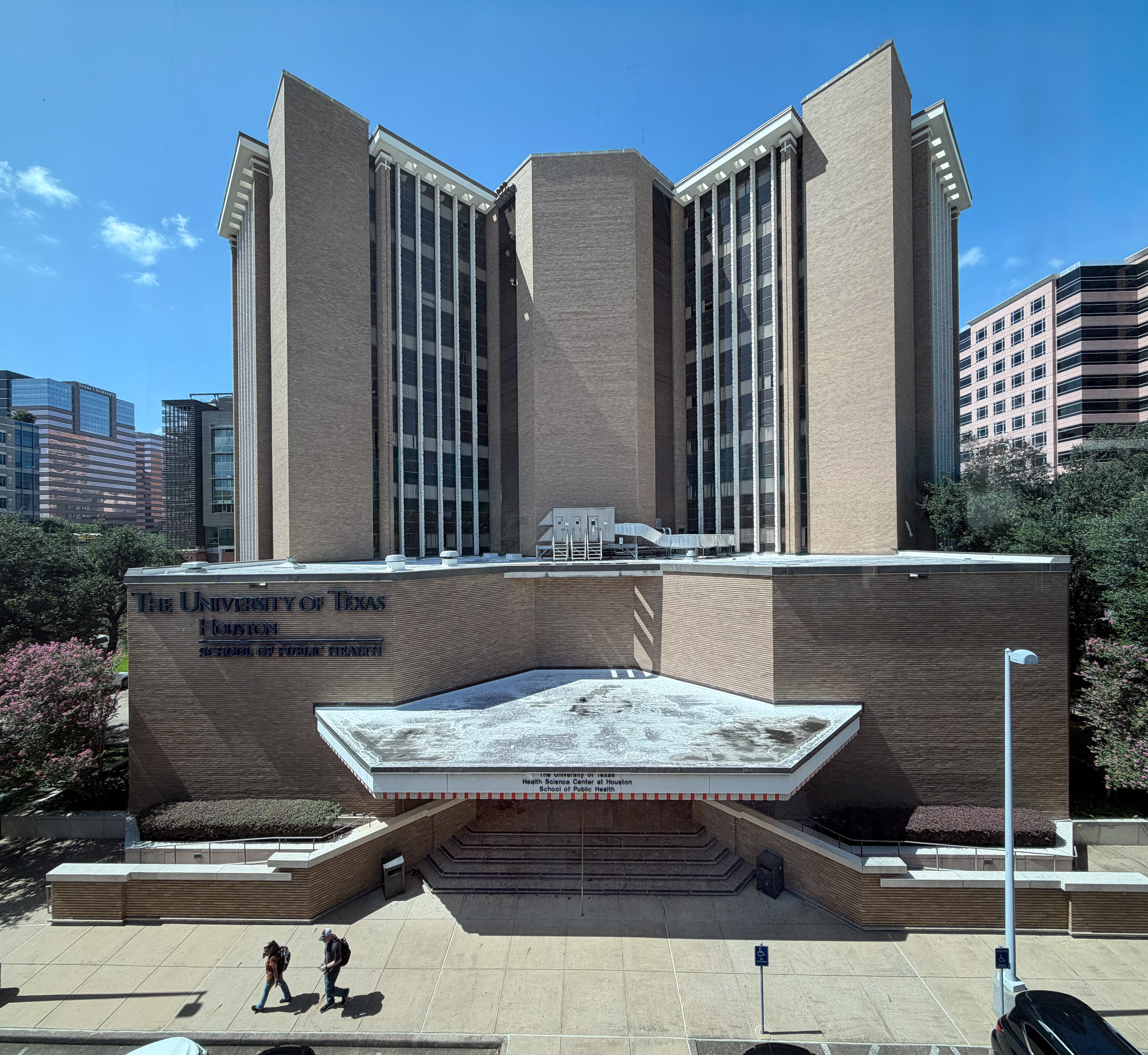
- Type: Public
- Established: 1967 (authorized 1947)
- Parent institution: The University of Texas Health Science Center at Houston
- Dean: Eric Boerwinkle
- Location: Main Campus; Houston, Texas; Regional Campuses; San Antonio; El Paso; Dallas; Brownsville; Austin
- Campus: Urban
- Website: sph.uth.edu

The UTHealth Houston School of Public Health is one of six component institutions of the University of Texas Health Science Center at Houston. A nationally top-ranked school of public health, UTHealth Houston School of Public Health sets the standard for excellence in academic education, research, and engagement.

The Texas Legislature authorized the creation of a school of public health in 1947, but did not appropriate funds for the school until 1967. The first class was admitted in the fall of 1969, doubled in the second year and doubled again in the third year, with continued growth over the years since.

UTHealth Houston brings together the School of Public Health, with the Medical School, the School of Nursing, the School of Dentistry, the Graduate School of Biomedical Sciences, the School of Biomedical Informatics, and the UT Harris County Psychiatric Center.

The school's main campus is located in Houston's famed Texas Medical Center. It originally occupied rented and borrowed space in the Medical Center but today it occupies its own building plus regional campuses in San Antonio, El Paso, Dallas, Brownsville, and Austin.

== Degrees offered ==
The UTHealth Houston School of Public Health offers master's and doctoral degrees, including the M.P.H., M.S., Dr.P.H., and Ph.D. The school also offers graduate certificate programs in public health.

The University has five academic departments: Biostatistics and Data Science; Environmental and Occupational Health Sciences; Epidemiology; Health Promotion and Behavioral Sciences; Management, Policy and Community Health.

=== Dual degree programs ===
The school also cooperates with other institutions within the University of Texas System and around the state to offer various dual degree programs.

MD/MPH

- Baylor College of Medicine
- Texas Tech Paul L. Foster School of Medicine
- University of Texas at Austin Dell Medical School
- University of Texas Rio Grande Valley School of Medicine
- University of Texas Southwestern Medical School
- UTHealth San Antonio Long School of Medicine
- UTHealth McGovern Medical School

DDS/MPH

- UTHealth School of Dentistry

JD/MPH

- University of Houston Law Center

MBA/MPH

- University of Texas at San Antonio College of Business

MSSW/MPH

- University of Houston School of Social Work
- Steve Hicks School of Social Work
- University of Texas at Arlington School of Social Work

MGPS/MPH

- University of Texas at Austin LBJ School of Public Affairs

MPAff/MPH

- University of Texas at Austin LBJ School of Public Affairs

MS/MPH

- UTHealth School of Biomedical Informatics

MSN/MPH

- UTHealth Cizik School of Nursing

PhD/MPH

- UTHealth School of Biomedical Informatics
