= Dennis Lindley =

British statistician (1923–2013)

Dennis Victor Lindley
- Born: 25 July 1923; Surbiton, London, England
- Died: 14 December 2013 (aged 90); Somerset, England
- Education: Trinity College, Cambridge
- Known for: Bayesian statistics, Lindley's Paradox, Lindley equation, Cromwell's Rule
- Awards: Guy Medal (Silver, 1968) (Gold, 2002)
- Scientific career
- Workplaces: University of Cambridge; University of Wales, Aberystwyth; University College London
- Doctoral advisor: George A. Barnard
- Doctoral students: Adrian Smith; John Gittins; Thomas H. Leonard; José-Miguel Bernardo

Dennis Victor Lindley (25 July 1923 – 14 December 2013) was an English statistician, decision theorist and leading advocate of Bayesian statistics.

== Biography ==
Lindley grew up in the south-west London suburb of Surbiton. He was an only child and his father was a local building contractor. Lindley recalled (to Adrian Smith) that the family had "little culture" and that both his parents were "proud of the fact that they had never read a book". The school Lindley attended, Tiffin School, introduced him to "ordinary cultural activities". From there Lindley went to read mathematics at Trinity College, Cambridge in 1941. During the war the degree course lasted only two years and, on finishing, Lindley had a choice between entering the armed forces and joining the Civil Service as a statistician. He chose the latter and, after taking a short course given by Oscar Irwin which he "did not understand", he joined a section of the Ministry of Supply doing statistical work under George Barnard.

After the war, Lindley spent some time at the National Physical Laboratory before returning to Cambridge for a further year of study. From 1948 to 1960 he worked at Cambridge, starting as a demonstrator and leaving as director of the Statistical Laboratory. In 1960 Lindley left to take up a new chair at Aberystwyth. It is widely acknowledged that in 1961, Lindley was the first to solve the Secretary problem in a scientific article. In 1967 he moved to University College London. In 1977 Lindley took early retirement at the age of 54. From then until 1987 he travelled the world as an "itinerant scholar", and later continued to write and to attend conferences. He was awarded the Royal Statistical Society's Guy Medal in Gold in 2002.

Lindley first encountered statistics as a set of techniques and in his early years at Cambridge, he worked to find a mathematical basis for the subject. His lectures on probability were based on Kolmogorov's approach which at that time had no following in Britain. In 1954 Lindley met Savage who was also looking for a deeper justification of the ideas of Neyman, Pearson, Wald and Fisher. Both found that justification in Bayesian theory and they turned into critics of the classical statistical inference they had hoped to justify. Lindley became a great missionary for the Bayesian gospel. The atmosphere of the Bayesian revival is captured in a comment by Rivett on Lindley's move to University College London and the premier chair of statistics in Britain: "it was as though a Jehovah's Witness had been elected Pope".

In 1959 he was elected as a Fellow of the American Statistical Association.

In 2000, the International Society for Bayesian Analysis created the Lindley prize in his honour.

== Publications ==
Uncertainty is a personal matter; it is not the uncertainty but your uncertainty.

— Dennis Lindley, Understanding Uncertainty (2006)
- (with J. C. P. Miller) Cambridge Elementary Statistical Tables, Cambridge. 1953.
- Fiducial distributions and Bayes’ theorem, Journal of the Royal Statistical Society B 1958 vol.20 p.102-107. The distribution analysed now known as the Lindley distribution.
- Introduction to Probability and Statistics from a Bayesian Viewpoint, 2 volumes, Cambridge 1965.
- Bayesian Statistics : a Review, SIAM. 1971.
- Making Decisions, Wiley-Interscience. 1971.
- (with W.F. Scott) New Cambridge Elementary Statistical Tables, Cambridge. 1984. The bibliography in Freeman and Smith lists 118 articles up to 1993.
- "The Philosophy of Statistics," Journal of the Royal Statistical Society: Series D (The Statistician), Vol. 49, No. 3, (2000), pp. 293–337.
- Understanding Uncertainty, Wiley-Interscience, 2006 (Revised edition 2014; Chichester: Wiley).

== Sources ==
70th birthday tribute

- Freeman, P. R.; Smith, A. F. M., eds. (1994). Aspects of Uncertainty: A Tribute to D. V. Lindley. Wiley. ISBN 0471943479. This contains a biography and articles by various authors.
- Rivett, P. (May 1995). "Review of Aspects of Uncertainty". Journal of the Operational Research Society. 46 (5): 663–665. doi:10.1057/jors.1995.91. S2CID 62223030.

Interviews

- Smith, Adrian (August 1995). "A Conversation with Dennis Lindley". Statistical Science. 10 (3). Institute of Mathematical Statistics: 305–319. doi:10.1214/ss/1177009940. JSTOR 2246016.
- Joyce, Helen (June 2004). "Bayesian Thoughts". Significance. 1 (2). Wiley-Blackwell: 73–75. doi:10.1111/j.1740-9713.2004.027.x.
- O'Hagan, Tony (5 August 2013). "Interview with Dennis Lindley". Royal Statistical Society.
