= Sudipto Banerjee =

Indian-American statistician

- Born: October 23, 1972 (age 53); Kolkata, India
- Education: Presidency College, Kolkata; Indian Statistical Institute; University of Connecticut, Storrs
- Known for: Bayesian hierarchical modeling, Gaussian process, spatial data analysis, Wombling
- Awards: Mortimer Spiegelman Award, ASA Outstanding Statistical Application Award, George W. Snedecor Award
- Scientific career
- Fields: Statistics
- Workplaces: University of Minnesota, Twin Cities; University of California, Los Angeles
- Thesis: Multivariate Spatial Modelling in a Bayesian Setting (2000)
- Doctoral advisor: Alan E. Gelfand

Sudipto Banerjee (born October 23, 1972) is an Indian-American statistician best known for his research contributions to Bayesian hierarchical modeling and inference for spatial data analysis. He is Professor of Biostatistics and Senior Associate Dean in the School of Public Health at the University of California, Los Angeles. He served as the Chair of the Department of Biostatistics at UCLA from 2014 through 2023. He served as the elected President of the International Society for Bayesian Analysis in 2022.

== Early life and education ==
Banerjee was born in Kolkata, India. He attended Presidency College, Kolkata for his undergraduate studies, and the Indian Statistical Institute, graduating with an M.STAT in 1996. Subsequently, he moved to the United States and obtained an MS and PhD in statistics from the University of Connecticut in 2000, where he was introduced to Bayesian statistics and hierarchical modeling by Alan Enoch Gelfand who had been a pioneer in the development of the Gibbs sampler and Markov chain Monte Carlo algorithms in Bayesian statistics.

== Career ==
Banerjee joined the University of Minnesota, Twin Cities in 2000 as an assistant professor of Biostatistics and was associated with the School of Public Health for 14 years. There he worked on a number of problems on spatial statistics, developing theory and methods related to Bayesian modeling and inference for geographic data with wide-ranging applications in public and environmental health sciences, ecology, forestry, real estate economics and agronomy. In 2014, Banerjee joined the Department of Biostatistics in the School of Public Health at UCLA as Professor and Chair of Biostatistics.

== Research ==
Banerjee's scholarly works include substantial contributions to spatial statistics and its applications in environmental, social and health sciences. He has made contributions to the broad area of Bayesian statistics and hierarchical models for analyzing spatial-temporal data and, more specifically, in the following areas within space-time modeling: (i) statistical inference for spatial gradients and zones of rapid change (also called wombling); (ii) scaling up Gaussian process models for massive spatial data analysis; (iii) graphical models for high-dimensional spatial data analysis; (iii) spatial frailties and space-time survival analysis; and (iv) computational algorithms and software for spatial data analysis. His notable statistical innovations include Gaussian predictive process and Nearest-Neighbor Gaussian process models for massive spatial-temporal data, and multivariate Markov random fields for regionally aggregated spatial data.

Banerjee's interdisciplinary research contributions include activities surrounding exposure data science in the GuLF Study (Gulf Long-term Follow-up Study) Program examining the human-health consequences of the Deepwater Horizon oil spill in April 2010. The spill followed an explosion on a drilling rig leased by BP, the British oil company, and led to the release of over four million barrels of oil into the Gulf of Mexico, 48 miles off the coast of Louisiana in the United States. Banerjee has been actively involved in collaborative frameworks involving public health researchers with expertise in epidemiology, environmental and occupational health, and biostatistics that would be responsible for sound statistical practices including methods for comprehensively analyzing the exposure of workers to potentially harmful chemicals. Banerjee was invited to serve on a committee formed by the National Research Council and the National Academy of Sciences in 2015-16 for his expertise in the use of spatial data science in analyzing and synthesizing geographically referenced flood insurance data in devising an affordability framework for Federal Emergency Management Agency (FEMA). Professor Banerjee contributed with his expertise in spatial data science and GIS technologies within a comprehensive policy framework to ascertain when and where premium increases from the Biggert–Waters Flood Insurance Reform Act of 2012 lose cost effectiveness.

== Awards and honors ==
- 2009 Abdel El Sharaawi Award from The International Environmetrics Society (TIES)
- 2010 Elected Member of the International Statistical Institute
- 2011 Mortimer Spiegelman Award from the American Public Health Association
- 2012 Elected Fellow of the American Statistical Association (ASA)
- 2012 International Indian Statistical Association’s Early Career Award
- 2015 Distinguished Achievement Medal from the American Statistical Association Section on Statistics and the Environment
- 2015 Elected Fellow of the Institute of Mathematical Statistics (IMS)
- 2017 American Statistical Association's Outstanding Application Award
- 2018 Elected Fellow of the International Society for Bayesian Analysis (ISBA)
- 2019 George W. Snedecor Award from the Committee of Presidents of Statistical Societies (COPSS)
- 2020 Elected Fellow of the American Association for the Advancement of Science (AAAS)
- 2021-2023 Elected President (President-Elect, 2021; President, 2022; Past-President, 2023) of the International Society for Bayesian Analysis (ISBA)
- 2024 Jerome Sacks Award for Outstanding Cross-Disciplinary Research from the National Institute of Statistical Science (NISS)
- 2027 Medallion Award and Lectureship from the Institute of Mathematical Statistics (IMS)

== Selected works ==
- Banerjee, Sudipto; Carlin, Bradley P.; Gelfand, Alan E. (2014), Hierarchical Modeling and Analysis for Spatial Data, Second Edition, Monographs on Statistics and Applied Probability (2nd ed.), Chapman and Hall/CRC, ISBN 9781439819173
- Banerjee, Sudipto; Roy, Anindya (2014), Linear Algebra and Matrix Analysis for Statistics, Texts in Statistical Science (1st ed.), Chapman and Hall/CRC, ISBN 978-1420095388
- National Research Council (2015). Affordability of National Flood Insurance Program Premiums: Report 1. Washington, D.C.: National Academies Press. doi:10.17226/21709. ISBN 978-0-309-37125-4. OL 29277639M. Wikidata Q106095870.
- Banerjee, S. (2005). "On geodetic distance computations in spatial modeling". Biometrics. 61 (2): 617–625. doi:10.1111/j.1541-0420.2005.00320.x. PMID 16011712. Wikidata Q51633246.
- Banerjee, S.; Gelfand, A.E. (2006). "Bayesian Wombling". Journal of the American Statistical Association. 101 (476): 1487–1501. doi:10.1198/016214506000000041. PMC 2835372. PMID 20221318. Zbl 1171.62347. Wikidata Q24631027.
- Jin, X.; Banerjee, S.; Carlin, B.P. (2007). "Order-free co-regionalized areal data models with application to multiple-disease mapping". Journal of the Royal Statistical Society Series B: Statistical Methodology. 69 (5): 817–838. doi:10.1111/j.1467-9868.2007.00612.x. PMC 2963450. PMID 20981244. Wikidata Q33730210.
- Banerjee, S.; Gelfand, A.E.; Finley, A.O.; Sang, H. (2008). "Gaussian predictive process models for large spatial data sets". Journal of the Royal Statistical Society Series B: Statistical Methodology. 70 (4): 825–848. doi:10.1111/j.1467-9868.2008.00663.x. PMC 2741335. PMID 19750209. Wikidata Q33502739.
- Datta, A.; Banerjee, S.; Finley, A.O.; Gelfand, A.E. (2016). "Hierarchical Nearest-Neighbor Gaussian Process Models for Large Geostatistical Datasets". Journal of the American Statistical Association. 111 (514): 800–812. doi:10.1080/01621459.2015.1044091. PMC 5927603. PMID 29720777. Wikidata Q55401486.
- Banerjee, S. (2017). "High-Dimensional Bayesian Geostatistics". Bayesian Analysis. 12 (2): 583–614. arXiv:1705.07265. doi:10.1214/17-ba1056r. PMC 5790125. PMID 29391920. Zbl 1384.62315. Wikidata Q47552858.
- Dey, D.; Datta, A.; Banerjee, S. (2022). "Graphical Gaussian process models for highly multivariate spatial data". Biometrika. 109 (4): 993–1014. doi:10.1093/biomet/asab061. PMID 36643962. Wikidata Q115582917.
