= Ramanathan Gnanadesikan =

Indian statistician (1932-2015)

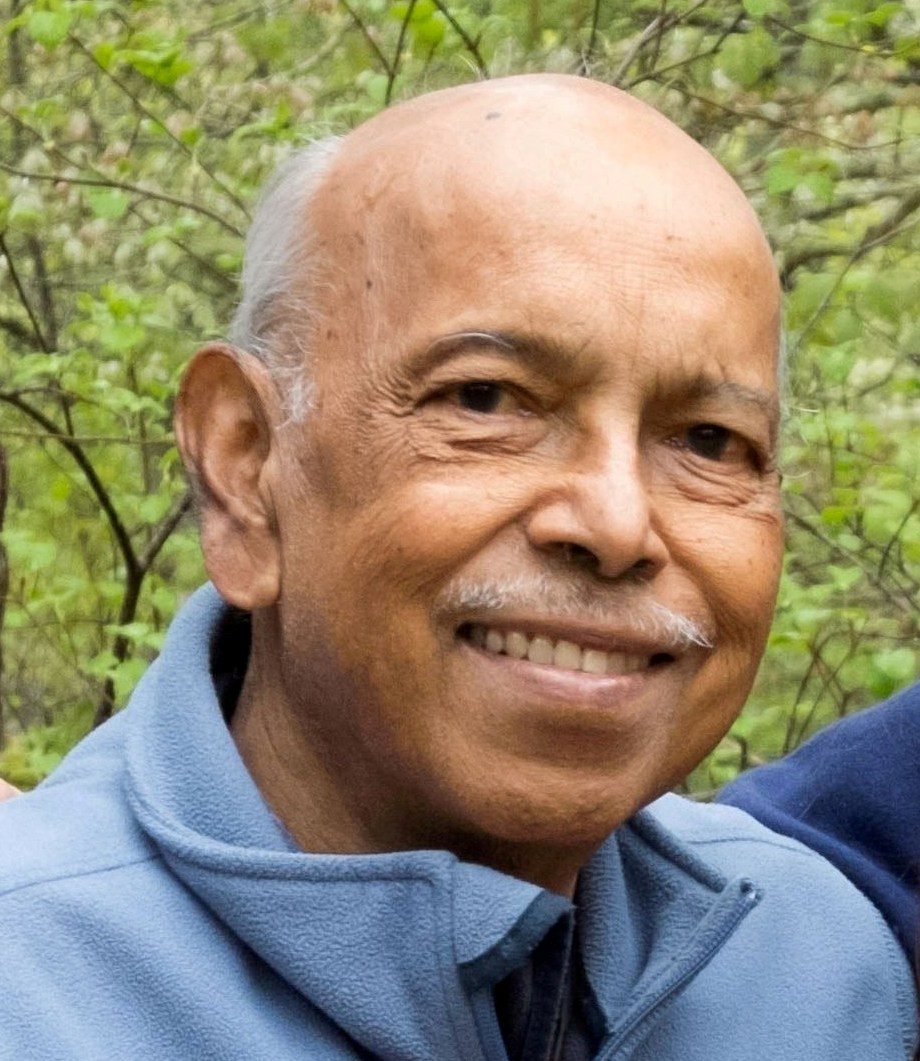
- Born: 2 November 1932; Madras, British India
- Died: 6 July 2015 (aged 82); Vineyard Haven, Massachusetts, United States
- Education: University of Madras; University of North Carolina
- Awards: 2009 Jerome Sacks Award for Cross-Disciplinary Research
- Scientific career
- Fields: Mathematics
- Workplaces: Bell Labs, Bellcore, Rutgers
- Doctoral advisor: Samarendra Nath Roy

Ramanathan Gnanadesikan (2 November 1932 – 6 July 2015) was an Indian statistician, known for his work in multivariate data analysis and leadership in the field. He received his Ph.D. at the University of North Carolina and headed research groups in statistics at Bell Laboratories and Bellcore. He was a fellow of American Association for the Advancement of Science, American Statistical Association, Institute of Mathematical Statistics and Royal Statistical Society, and elected member of the International Statistical Institute. He served as President of Institute of Mathematical Statistics and the International Association for Statistical Computing, the latter of which he helped found.

== Early life ==
He was born in Madras (now Chennai, India). His father A. Ramanathan Pillai, was a zoologist and university vice-chancellor. As a 12-year-old boy, he sympathized with the Indian Independence movement and spent two weeks at the ashram founded by Mahatma Gandhi. He credited this experience for inspiring a lifelong concern with social justice. He attended the University of Madras, from which he received both bachelor's and master's degrees in statistics. The latter of these was based on work done at the Indian Statistical Institute in Calcutta.

== Career ==
At the age of 20, he came to the United States to work on his Ph.D. at the University of North Carolina at Chapel Hill. While there he was involved with the civil rights movement and participated in lunch counter protests. When the first African-American undergraduates were admitted to the university, he helped arrange their accommodation in the International Student House. For his contributions to the university he was elected to the Order of the Golden Fleece.

His Ph.D. work was with Prof. S.N.Roy in the area of factor analysis. This line of research (which can be seen in the monograph Roy, Gnanadesikan and Srivastava, 1971), was concerned with extracting information from experiments where a large number of input variables result in a large number of output variables. One important thrust of this work was how to deal with both structured variables (i.e. data where the variable varies across some range of values) and unstructured variables (variables like disease state or color where the order is essentially arbitrary). A second thrust was evaluating whether the results of such analyses were dependent on small changes in the input variables, leading to an unrealistic sensitivity to errors of measurement.

After two years working at Procter & Gamble, he was hired by John Tukey to work in the nascent statistics group at Bell Telephone Laboratories and became a department head shortly afterwards. He worked closely with Martin Wilk, with whom he wrote a number of papers on graphical methods for data analysis. The most widely cited of these (Wilk and Gnanadesikan, 1968) describes the Q–Q and P–P plots, which are used to compare different statistical distributions. This work arose in part out of work in speaker recognition, as it was found that the statistical distribution of energy across frequency bands was different for different speakers. His highly-cited 1977 monograph on multivariate data analysis has been translated into Japanese and Russian and a second edition was published in 1997.

When the Bell system was broken up in 1984, he moved to Bell Communications Research (later Telcordia Technologies), first as a division manager of information science, covering economics and human factors research as well as statistics, and later as an assistant vice president. He retired in 1991 and became a full professor in the Department of Statistics at Rutgers University, retiring in 1998.

In 1996 Gnanadesikan was awarded the American Statistical Association's Founders Award. He was the recipient of the 2009 Jerome Sacks Award for Cross Disciplinary Research.

== Personal life ==
In 1965, he married Mrudulla, a fellow statistician who had a distinguished career in statistical education. He has two sons, Anand, a professor of oceanography at Johns Hopkins University, and Mukund, a psychiatrist in Napa, CA.

He was a founding member of the Association of Indians in America, the first national association of Indians in the United States, and served as one of the organization's first co-presidents. He died on 6 July 2015.
