= Mike West (statistician) =

English and American statistician

Mike West is an English and American statistician. West works primarily in the field of Bayesian statistics, with research contributions ranging from theory to applied research in areas including finance, commerce, macroeconomics, climatology, engineering, genomics and other areas of biology. Since 1999, West has been the Arts & Sciences Distinguished Professor of Statistics & Decision Sciences in the Department of Statistical Science at Duke University.

== Education and career ==
West earned a BSc in mathematics in 1978, and then PhD in mathematics (Statistics) in 1982, from the University of Nottingham. He worked at Warwick University before joining Duke University in 1988, where he became the Director of the Institute of Statistics and Decision Sciences (ISDS) from 1990 to 2001.

West has made significant contributions to Bayesian theory and methods for time series analysis and forecasting. He has also conducted research on non-parametric Bayesian analysis with methodological and applied research that include implementations of Dirichlet process mixture models starting with a paper published in 1995. His research with molecular geneticists and clinical researchers involved developing predictive models for identifying types of breast cancer using gene expression data, contributing to the popularisation of biomarker discovery through gene expression profiling.

West has been a consultant with various companies, banks, government agencies and academic centres, co-founder of a biotech company, and board member of several financial and IT companies. West has also served the international statistics profession in founding roles and as a board member in a number of national and international centres and institutes as well as professional societies.

== Elected positions & honours ==
President of the International Society for Bayesian Analysis in 2009–2010.

Elected Fellow of the Royal Statistical Society in 1982, of the Institute of Mathematical Statistics in 1993, of the American Statistical Association in 1993, of the International Statistical Institute in 1997, and elected inaugural fellow of the International Society for Bayesian Analysis in 2012.

Founding Chair of the International Society for Bayesian Analysis (ISBA) section on Economics, Finance, and Business in 2012-2013

Chair of the American Statistical Association section on Bayesian Statistical Science in 2010.

== Books ==
- Time Series: Modeling, Computation & Inference. Chapman & Hall/CRC Press
  - 2021, 2nd edition, R. Prado, M.A.R. Ferreira and M. West
  - 2010, 1st edition, R. Prado and M. West
- Bayesian Forecasting and Dynamic Models, Springer Verlag
  - 1997, 2nd edition, M. West and P. J. Harrison
  - 1989, 1st edition, M. West and P. J. Harrison
- Applied Bayesian Forecasting and Time Series Analysis, Chapman-Hall
  - 1994, A. Pole, M. West, and P. J. Harrison

== Selected awards & recognition ==
- Bruno de Finetti Lecture Award of the International Society of Bayesian Analysis (ISBA), 2022
- Akaike Memorial Lecture Award, 2018
- Zellner Medal, International Society for Bayesian Analysis (inaugural award), 2014
- Three-time winner of the Mitchell Prize for applications of Bayesian analysis, 1994, 1997 and 2012
- American Statistical Association, NC Chapter Award for development of statistics and contributions to theory and practice
