= Journal of the Royal Statistical Society =

- Discipline: Statistics
- Language: English

Publication details
- History: 1838–present
- Publisher: Oxford University Press (United Kingdom)
- Impact factor: 2.175 (Series A); 4.933 (Series B); 1.680 (Series C) (2021)

Standard abbreviations
- ISO 4: J. R. Stat. Soc.

Indexing
- ISSN: 0964-1998
- LCCN: sn99023416
- OCLC no.: 18305542

Links
- Journal homepage

The Journal of the Royal Statistical Society is a peer-reviewed scientific journal of statistics. It comprises three series and is published by Oxford University Press for the Royal Statistical Society.

== History ==
The Statistical Society of London was founded in 1834, but would not begin producing a journal for four years. From 1834 to 1837, members of the society would read the results of their studies to the other members, and some details were recorded in the proceedings. The first study reported to the society in 1834 was a simple survey of the occupations of people in Manchester, England. Conducted by going door-to-door and inquiring, the study revealed that the most common profession was mill-hands, followed closely by weavers.

When founded, the membership of the Statistical Society of London overlapped almost completely with the statistical section of the British Association for the Advancement of Science. In 1837 a volume of Transactions of the Statistical Society of London were written, and in May 1838 the society began its journal. The first editor-in-chief of the journal was Rawson W. Rawson. In the early days of the society and the journal, there was dispute over whether or not opinions should be expressed, or merely the numbers. The symbol of the society was a wheatsheaf, representing a bundle of facts, and the motto Aliis exterendum, Latin for "to be threshed out by others." Many early members chafed under this prohibition, and in 1857 the motto was dropped.

From 1838 to 1886, the journal was published as the Journal of the Statistical Society of London (ISSN 0959-5341). In 1887 it was renamed the Journal of the Royal Statistical Society (ISSN 0952-8385) when the society was granted a Royal Charter.

On its centenary in 1934, the society inaugurated a Supplement to the Journal of the Royal Statistical Society to publish work on industrial and agricultural applications. In 1948 the society reorganised its journals and the main journal became the Journal of the Royal Statistical Society, Series A (General) (ISSN 0035-9238) and the supplement became Series B (Statistical Methodology). In 1988, Series A changed its name to Series A (Statistics in Society).

In 1952, the society founded Applied Statistics of the Journal of the Royal Statistical Society which became Series C (Applied Statistics). After merging with the Institute of Statisticians in 1993, the society published Series D (The Statistician) (ISSN 0039-0526), but this journal was closed in 2003, to be replaced by Significance.

== Discussion papers ==
Traditionally papers were presented at ordinary meetings of the society and those present, whether fellows or not, were invited to comment on the presentation. The paper and subsequent discussion would then be published in the journal. This followed a format used by other scientific societies of the time, such as the Royal Society. This practice continues although papers are selected for reading and go through peer review before being presented. It is considered a significant recognition to be invited to present a paper at an ordinary meeting of the society. This selection is currently done by the research section of the society for Series B and by an appointed editor for Series A&C. Papers are selected to be of importance and wide interest in terms of application or applicability.

Any person is invited to attend discussion meetings and contribute to the discussion although they are limited to 5 minutes speaking time. Following the formal presentation of the paper, two speakers are invited to comment by prior arrangement. Formally they are there to propose and second the 'vote of thanks' and would have respectively praised and criticised the presentation. Contributions to the discussion are not peer reviewed but are limited to 400 words in the journal.

== Current series ==
As of 2009, three series are published under this general title.

=== Journal of the Royal Statistical Society, Series A (Statistics in Society) ===
Statistics in Society (ISSN 0964-1998) is published quarterly. Its 2021 impact factor is 2.175.

Past and current editors:

- 1987–1990: Harvey Goldstein
- 1989–1992: Sheila Gore
- 1991–1994: Tim Holt
- 1993–1996: Simon Thompson
- 1995–1998: Ian Plewis
- 1997–2000: Gillian Raab
- 1999–2001: Clive Payne
- 2001–2004: Nicola Best
- 2002–2005: Peter Lynn
- 2004–2004: John Haigh
- 2005–2008: Geert Verbeke
- 2006–2010: Antony Fielding
- 2009–2012: Simon Day
- 2011–2014: Arnaud Chevalier
- 2013–2016: Linda Sharples
- 2015–2018: Harvey Goldstein
- 2017–2020: James Carpenter
- 2019–2022: Jouni Kuha
- 2021–2024: Bianca de Stavola
- 2023–2026: Mike Elliott
- 2025–2028: Nikos Tzavidis

=== Journal of the Royal Statistical Society, Series B (Statistical Methodology) ===
Statistical Methodology (ISSN 1369-7412) is published five times a year. Its 2021 impact factor is 4.933.

Starting in 1934, it was originally called Supplement to the Journal of the Royal Statistical Society (ISSN 1466-6162), and in 1948 was changed to Journal of the Royal Statistical Society, Series B (Methodological) (ISSN 0035-9246), before being changed to its current name in 1998.

In a 2003 survey of statisticians, Series B was perceived to have been one of the highest quality journals in statistics.

Past and current editors:

- 1951–1959: J. O. Irwin
- 1960–1964: N. T. J. Bailey
- 1960–1964: David Cox
- 1965–1969: D. M. G. Wishart
- 1965–1969: David Bartholomew
- 1970–1974: D. E. Barton
- 1975–1978: Mervyn Stone
- 1978–1981: J. A. Anderson
- 1978–1983: T. M. F. Smith
- 1980–1983: P. Holgate
- 1982–1985: P. M. E. Altham
- 1984–1987: Peter Diggle
- 1986–1989: Mike Titterington
- 1988–1991: R. L. Smith
- 1990–1993: John T. Kent
- 1992–1995: Anthony C. Atkinson
- 1994–1997: Alastair Young
- 1996–1999: Chris Jones
- 1998–2001: David Firth
- 2000–2003: Anthony C. Davison
- 2002–2005: Robin Henderson
- 2004–2007: Andy Wood
- 2006–2009: Christian Robert
- 2008–2011: George Casella
- 2010–2013: Gareth Roberts
- 2012–2015: Ingrid van Keilegom
- 2014–2017: Piotr Fryzlewicz
- 2016–2019: David Dunson
- 2018–2021: Simon Wood
- 2020–2022: Aurore Delaigle
- 2021–2023: Steffen Lauritzen
- 2022–2024: Q. Yao
- 2023–2025: Daniela Witten
- 2024–2026: Hani Doss
- 2025–2027: Xuming He
- 2026–2028: Nicolas Chopin

=== Journal of the Royal Statistical Society, Series C (Applied Statistics) ===
Applied Statistics (ISSN 0035-9254) is published five times a year. Its 2021 impact factor is 1.680.

A review of the first 227 algorithms published as source code in Applied Statistics is available. The last such code was published in 1997.

Past and current editors:

- 1987–1990: I. R. Dunsmore
- 1989–1992: David J. Hand
- 1991–1994: Wotjek J. Krzanowski
- 1993–1996: Donald A. Preece
- 1995–1998: S. M. Lewis
- 1997–2000: John N. S. Matthews
- 1999–2002: Adrian Bowman
- 2001–2004: Geert Molenberghs
- 2003–2006: C. A. Glasbey
- 2005–2008: Steven Gilmour
- 2007–2010: Chris J. Skinner
- 2009–2012: M. S. Ridout
- 2011–2014: Richard Chandler
- 2013–2016: Peter W. F. Smith
- 2015–2019: Nigel Stallard
- 2017–2019: Richard Boys
- 2019–2022: Nial Friel
- 2020–2020: Peter W. F. Smith
- 2021–2024: Janine Illian
- 2023–2026: Thomas Kneib
- 2025–2028: Thordis Thorarinsdottir

=== Journal of the Royal Statistical Society, Series D (The Statistician) ===
The Statistician (ISSN 0039-0526) is no longer published, but was published 4 times a year up to 2003, being replaced by Significance. The final editors were A.J. Watkins (University of Wales) and L.C. Wolstenholme (City University London). The Statistician was added in parallel to Series A–C as a Royal Statistical Society publication in 1993, having previously been published by the Institute of Statisticians.

== Allied publications ==
Since 2004 the Society has published Significance, which consists of articles on topics of statistical interest presented at a level suited to a general audience. From September 2010 Significance is jointly published with the American Statistical Association and distributed to members of both societies.
