= Maria De Iorio =

Italian biostatistician

- Born: 1972 (age 53–54); Italian
- Occupation: biostatistician
- Notable work: a professor of the National University of Singapore.

Maria De Iorio (born 1972) is an Italian biostatistician whose research applies Bayesian statistics and nonparametric statistics in genomics and bioinformatics. She is a professor at the National University of Singapore.

== Education and career ==
De Iorio has a laurea in economics from Bocconi University in Italy. She completed a PhD in 2001 at Duke University in the US. Her dissertation, Markov Random Fields at Multiple Resolutions and an ANOVA Model for Dependent Random Measures, was supervised by Michael L. Lavine.

After postdoctoral research at the University of Oxford in England, she became a lecturer and later senior lecturer at Imperial College London beginning in 2003, in the Department of Epidemiology and Public Health. She moved to University College London in 2011, as reader in statistics, and became professor of biostatistics there in 2015.

She moved to the National University of Singapore in 2018, as head of a statistics program at Yale-NUS College. She added an affiliation with the Yong Loo Lin School of Medicine of the National University of Singapore in 2020, and transferred to the School of Medicine as a full-time professor in 2021. She also has a joint appointment in the university's Department of Statistics & Data Science.

== Recognition ==
De Iorio received the 2005 Research Prize of the Royal Statistical Society.

She was named as a Fellow of the International Society for Bayesian Analysis in 2020.
