= Womble (disambiguation) =

The Wombles are fictional creatures created by Elisabeth Beresford and originally appearing in a series of children's novels.

Womble may also refer to:

- The Wombles (1973 TV series), a stop motion series featuring the fictional creatures
- The Wombles (1996 TV series), an animated children series featuring the fictional creatures
  - The Wombles (band), British pop group spinoff from the TV series
- Womble (surname)
- Wimbledon F.C., a now defunct English football club, nicknamed The Wombles
- AFC Wimbledon, an English football club
- Ulster Defence Association, an Ulster loyalist paramilitary group in Northern Ireland
- WOMBLES, an anarchist group
- A type of Soviet NBC suit, because of its long faced respirator with round visor glasses

== See also ==
- Wombling, a statistical technique for identifying zones of abrupt change
