= Michele Guindani =

Italian statistician

- Education: Bocconi
- Scientific career
- Fields: Statistics
- Workplaces: UCLA; UC Irvine; University of Texas; Rice University; University of New Mexico
- Thesis: Bayesian Nonparametric Analysis of Spatial Data (2005)
- Doctoral advisor: Sonia Petrone and Alan E. Gelfand

Michele Guindani is an Italian statistician, specializing in Bayesian nonparametrics and Biostatistics. He is a professor of Biostatistics at the University of California, Los Angeles. He was president of the International Society for Bayesian Analysis in 2025. He was the editor-in-chief on the academic journal Bayesian Analysis from 2019 to 2021, and became editor-in-chief of Computational Statistics & Data Analysis in 2026.

== Honours and awards ==
- 2019: Fellow of the American Statistical Association
- 2022: Fellow of the International Society for Bayesian Analysis
