= Trevor Hastie =

American statistician & computer scientist (born 1953)

Trevor John Hastie
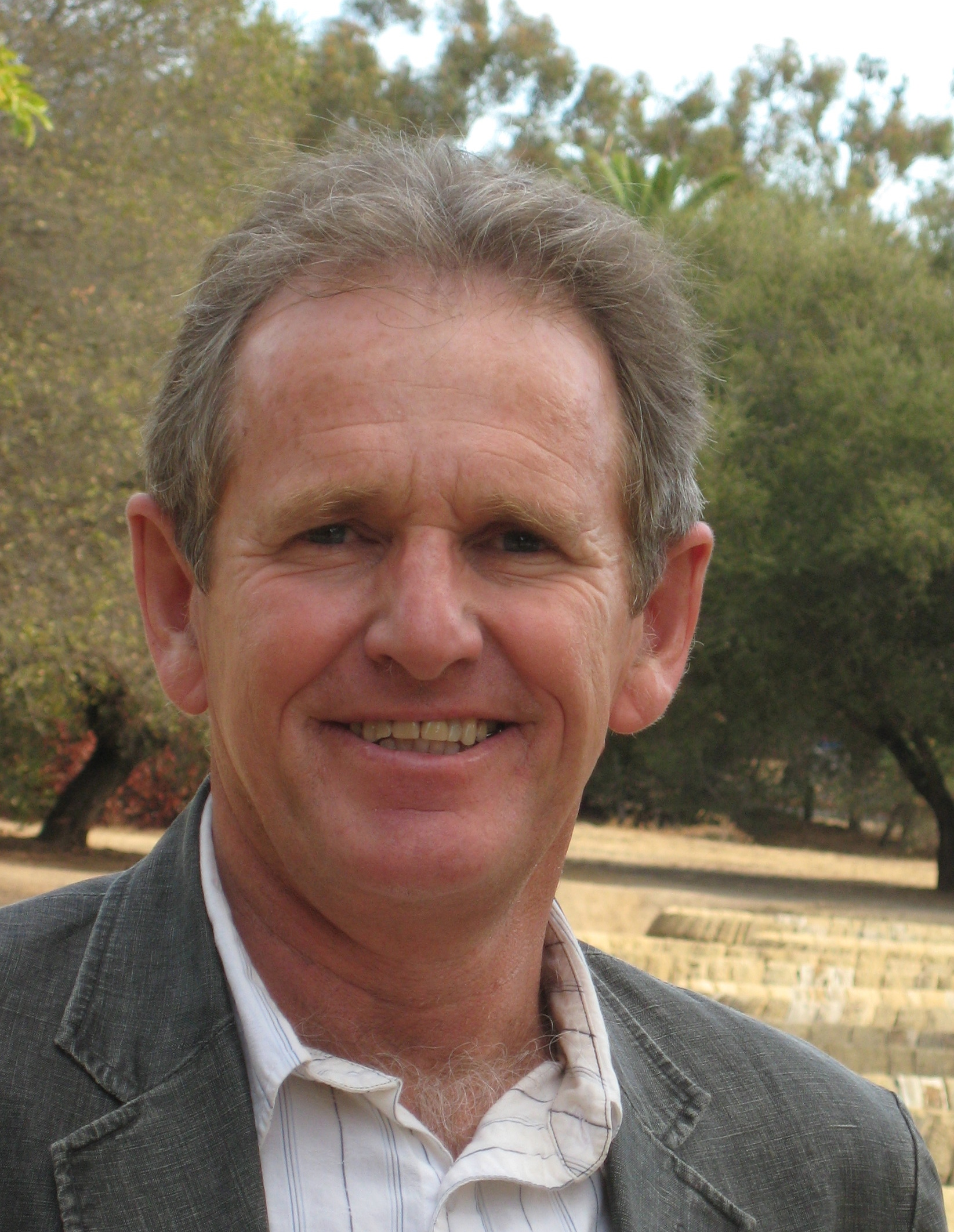
- Born: 27 June 1953 (age 73); Cape Town, South Africa
- Citizenship: American, South African
- Education: Stanford University; University of Cape Town; Rhodes University
- Spouse: Lynda Hastie
- Scientific career
- Fields: Statistical learning, Data science, Biostatistics, Statistical computing
- Workplaces: Stanford University; AT&T Bell Laboratories; London School of Hygiene and Tropical Medicine; South African Medical Research Council
- Doctoral advisor: Werner Stuetzle
- Doctoral students: Ph.D. advisor to 28 students: among these, Gareth James, Mu Zhu, Ji Zhu, Saharon Rosset, Hui Zou, Rahul Mazumder, Will Fithian, Jason Lee, Qingyuan Zhao, Zijun Gao, Elizabeth Chin, and Elena Tuzhilina are now university professors.

Trevor John Hastie (born 27 June 1953) is an American statistician and computer scientist. He is currently serving as the John A. Overdeck Professor of Mathematical Sciences and Professor of Statistics at Stanford University. Hastie is known for his contributions to applied statistics, especially in the field of machine learning, data mining, and bioinformatics. He has authored several popular books in statistical learning, including The Elements of Statistical Learning: Data Mining, Inference, and Prediction. Hastie has been listed as an ISI Highly Cited Author in Mathematics by the ISI Web of Knowledge. He also contributed to the development of S.

== Education and career ==
Hastie was born on 27 June 1953 in South Africa. He received his B.S. in statistics from the Rhodes University in 1976 and master's degree from University of Cape Town in 1979. Hastie joined the doctoral program at Stanford University in 1980 and received his Ph.D. in 1984 under the supervision of Werner Stuetzle. His dissertation was "Principal Curves and Surfaces".

Hastie began his professional career in 1977 with the South African Medical Research Council. After receiving his master's degree in 1979, he spent a year interning at the London School of Hygiene & Tropical Medicine, the Johnson Space Center in Houston, and the Biomath department at Oxford University. After receiving his doctoral degree from Stanford, Hastie returned to South Africa to work with his former employer South African Medical Research Council. He returned to United States in 1986 and joined the AT&T Bell Laboratories in Murray Hill, New Jersey and remained there for nine years. Working with John Chambers, he co-directed the development of the S programming language. He joined Stanford University in 1994 as Associate Professor in Statistics and Biostatistics. He was promoted to full Professor in 1999. During the period 2006–2009, he was the chair of the Department of Statistics at Stanford University. In 2013 he was named the John A. Overdeck Professor of Mathematical Sciences.

== Awards and honors ==
Hastie is a Fellow of the Royal Statistical Society since 1979. He is also an elected Fellow of several professional and scholarly societies, including the Institute of Mathematical Statistics, the American Statistical Association, and the South African Statistical Society. He is a recipient of 'Myrto Lefkopolou Distinguished Lectureship' award of Biostatistics Department at the Harvard School of Public Health. In 2018, he was elected a member of the National Academy of Sciences. In 2019 Hastie became a foreign member of the Royal Netherlands Academy of Arts and Sciences. Hastie was named for the C.R. and Bhargavi Rao Prize in 2025. Hastie and Hui Zou received the 2025 Founders of Statistics prize for their elastic net paper.

== Publications ==
Hastie is a prolific author of scientific works on numerous topics in applied statistics, including statistical learning, data mining, statistical computing, and bioinformatics. He along with his collaborators has authored about 125 scientific articles. Many of Hastie's scientific articles were coauthored by his longtime collaborator, Robert Tibshirani. Hastie has been listed as an ISI Highly Cited Author in Mathematics by the ISI Web of Knowledge. He has coauthored the following books:

- T. Hastie and R. Tibshirani, Generalized Additive Models, Chapman and Hall, 1990.
- J. Chambers and T. Hastie, Statistical Models in S, Wadsworth/Brooks Cole, 1991.
- T. Hastie, R. Tibshirani, and J. Friedman, The Elements of Statistical Learning: Prediction, Inference and Data Mining, Second Edition, Springer Verlag, 2009 (available for free from the author's website).
- G. James, D. Witten, T. Hastie, R. Tibshirani, An Introduction to Statistical Learning with Applications in R, Springer Verlag, 2013 (available for free from the co-author's website).
- T. Hastie, R. Tibshirani, M. Wainwright, Statistical Learning with Sparsity: the Lasso and Generalizations, CRC Press, 2015 (available for free from the author's website).
- Bradley Efron; Trevor Hastie (2016). Computer Age Statistical Inference. Cambridge University Press. ISBN 9781107149892.
