= Christian Robert =

French statistician (born 1961)

Christian P. Robert
- Born: September 9, 1961 (age 64)
- Education: ENSAE; Université de Rouen
- Scientific career
- Fields: Statistics
- Workplaces: Université Paris-Dauphine; University of Warwick
- Thesis: Résultats nouveaux sur les estimateurs à rétrécisseurs scalaires et matriciels (1987)
- Doctoral advisor: Jean-Pierre Raoult
- Doctoral students: Judith Rousseau
- Website: www.ceremade.dauphine.fr/~xian/ xianblog.wordpress.com

Christian P. Robert is a French statistician, specializing in Bayesian statistics and Monte Carlo methods.

== Career ==
Christian Robert studied at ENSAE then defended his PhD in 1987 at Université de Rouen. He held temporary positions at Purdue and Cornell before being an associate professor at Université Paris 6, and then Professor at Université de Rouen. He was also Professor of Statistics at École Polytechnique and director of Center for Research in Economics and Statistics. As of 2021, he is professor at CEREMADE, Université Paris-Dauphine and a part-time member of the Department of Statistics, University of Warwick.

== Works ==
Christian Robert is the author of several textbooks on Bayesian inference and Monte Carlo methods, including:

- Robert, Christian. The Bayesian choice: from decision-theoretic foundations to computational implementation. Springer Science & Business Media, 2007.
- Robert, Christian, and George Casella. Monte Carlo statistical methods. Springer Science & Business Media, 2013.
- Marin, Jean-Michel, and Christian P. Robert. Bayesian essentials with R. New York: Springer, 2014.

== Service ==
Robert served as the editor in chief of the Journal of the Royal Statistical Society, Series B, from 2006 to 2009. He was president of the International Society for Bayesian Analysis in 2008. In 2016 he was joint program chair of the AIStats conference.

== Awards ==
- Fellow of the Institute of Mathematical Statistics (1996)
- Fellow of the Royal Statistical Society (1998)
- International Society for Bayesian Analysis DeGroot prize for the Bayesian Choice (2003)
- Fellow of the American Statistical Association (2012)
- Fellow of the International Society for Bayesian Analysis (2014)
- Akaike Memorial Lecture Award 2026
