= International Association for Statistical Computing =

Section of the International Statistical Institute

The International Association for Statistical Computing was founded during the 41st Session of the International Statistical Institute in 1977, as a section of the ISI.

The objectives of the association are to foster worldwide interest in effective statistical computing and to exchange technical knowledge through international contacts and meetings between statisticians, computing professionals, organizations, institutions, governments and the general public.

The association is affiliated with the International Federation for Information Processing (IFIP). It publishes the journal called Computational Statistics & Data Analysis (CSDA) and Statistical Software Newsletter (CSDA SSN).

Past presidents

- Mervin E. Muller (USA) 1977–1979
- Sir Maurice Kendall (UK) and Wilfried J. Dixon (USA) 1979–1981
- Ramanathan Gnanadesikan (India) 1981–1983
- Svein Nordbotten (Norway) 1983–1985
- Klaus Neumann (GDR) 1985–1987
- Masashi Okamoto (Japan) 1987–1989
- John M. Chambers (USA) 1989–1991
- Norbert Victor (Germany) 1991–1993
- Natale Carlo Lauro (Italy) 1993–1995
- Murray A. Cameron (Australia) 1995–1997
- Edward J. Wegman (USA) 1997–1999
- Lutz Edler (Germany) 1999–2001
- Jae C. Lee (Korea) 2001–2003
- Stanley P. Azen (USA) 2003–2005
- Gilbert Saporta (France) 2005–2007
- Jaromir Antoch (France) 2007–2009
- Yutaka Tanaka (Japan) 2009–2011
- Karen Kafadar (USA) 2011–2013
- Paula Brito (Portugal) 2013–2015
- Patrick Groenen (Netherlands) 2015–2017
- Wing Kam Fung (Hong Kong) 2017–2019
- Jürgen Symanzik (USA) 2019-2021
- Christophe Croux (France) 2021-2023

Current president

- Chun-houh Chen (Taiwan) 2023-2025

== Data Analysis Competition ==
Results of previous competitions
| Year | Result |
|---|---|
| 2013 | Winner 1: Authors: Kim, C., and Choi, S. (University of Florida); Title: Marginal Structural Models for Causal effects of Higher Education Rates on Cancer Mortality Rates: Should we make our society highly educated?; Winner 2: Authors: Takagishi, M., Hirotsuru, K., Mitsuhiro, M., Kusaka, T., and Yadohisa, H. (Doshisha University); Title: Educational feature extraction across nations using UNdata |
| 2014 | Winner: Authors: David Kepplinger (Vienna University of Technology, Austria and United Nations Industrial Development Organization), Valentin Todorov (United Nations Industrial Development Organization), and Shyam Upadhyaya (United Nations Industrial Development Organization); Title: How industrial development effects the well-being of population: A detailed analysis to reveal the underlying mechanics |
| 2015 | Winner: Authors: Seungwon Lee, Chengxing Zhai, Lei Pan, Benyang Tang and Jonathan Jiang (Jet Propulsion Laboratory, California Institute of Technology); Title: Climate Model Diagnostic Analysis with Conditional Sampling |
| 2021 | 1st Place: Authors: J. Sousa Pimentel (Federal University of Bahia, Federal University of Pernambuco), R. Bulhoes (Federal University of Bahia, Federal University of Rio de Janeiro), V. Mesquita (Federal University of Bahia, University of São Paulo), P. Canas Rodrigues (Federal University of Bahia); Title: Spatio-temporal modelling of Brazilian wildfires; 2nd Place: Author: G. Zammarchi; Title: Impact of the COVID-19 outbreak on Italy’s country reputation: a sentiment analysis approach; 3rd Place: Author: S. A Kharroubi; Title: A Bayesian nonparametric approach for modelling health-related quality of life data; Honorable Mention: 1. Chih-Ling Chen, Qian-Wu Liao, H. Dahmani: HIV with antiretroviral therapy in Sub-Saharan Africa; 2. S. Gurria, A. Brito, J. Esteban Borja, J. Fullaondo, Y. Abdel Nasser: Factors that influence the GPA of high school students |
| 2023 | 1st Place: Authors: Zoë-Mae Adams and Johané Nienkemper-Swanepoel (Stellenbosch University); Title: Visualising opinions on the COVID-19 pandemic; 2nd Place: Authors: Cheng, Weilin; Liu, Hengyuan; Mo, Kathy (University of California, Davis); Tian, Sida and Yuan, Li (University of Michigan); Title: 2022-2023 H5N1 bird flu modeling and prediction in the United States; 3rd Place: Authors: Marcelo Bourguignon (Federal University of Rio Grande do Norte), Diego I. Gallardo (University of Atacama) and Helton Saulo (University of Brasília); Title: A parametric quantile beta regression for modeling case fatality rates of COVID-19; Honorable Mention: 1. Stefanie Bienert and Christopher Patzanovsky (Hasselt University): New York City shooting incidents, a wicked challenge 2. Olalekan J. Akintande (University of Ibadan): Japa Syndrome: The new normal of abnormality in Nigeria |
