= Tom Leonard =

Tom or Thomas Leonard may refer to:

- Tom Leonard (Irish politician) (1924–2004), Fianna Fáil politician from Dublin, Ireland
- Tom Leonard (poet) (1944–2018), Scottish poet
- Thomas J. Leonard (1955–2003), founder of Coach University
- Tom Leonard (tennis) (born 1948), American former tennis player
- Thomas D'Arcy Leonard (1895–1977), Canadian politician and corporate executive
- Thomas Arthur Leonard (1864–1948), British social reformer
- Thomas H. Leonard (born 1948), British statistician and author
- Tom Leonard (Michigan politician) (born 1981), member of the Michigan House of Representatives
- Thomas C. Leonard, American historian of economics
- Thomas Léonard (born 1981), French football referee
