= Alicia L. Carriquiry =

Uruguayan statistician

Alicia Laura Carriquiry
- Born: Uruguay
- Education: University of the Republic (Uruguay); University of Illinois at Urbana–Champaign; Iowa State University
- Known for: Nutrition and Forensic statistics
- Scientific career
- Workplaces: Iowa State University; Pontifical Catholic University of Chile
- Thesis: Bayesian Prediction and Its Application to the Genetic Evaluation of Livestock (1989)
- Doctoral advisor: David A. Harville

Alicia Laura Carriquiry is a Uruguayan statistician. She is a distinguished professor of statistics at Iowa State University, and was president of the International Society for Bayesian Analysis in 2001. Her research applies Bayesian statistics to nutrition, genomics, forensics, and traffic safety.

== Education and career ==
Carriquiry earned a degree in agricultural engineering from the University of the Republic (Uruguay) in 1981, and a master's degree in animal science from the University of Illinois at Urbana–Champaign in 1985. She continued her graduate studies at Iowa State University, earning a master's degree in statistics in 1986 and a PhD, jointly in statistics and animal science, in 1989. Her dissertation, supervised by David A. Harville, was Bayesian Prediction and Its Application to the Genetic Evaluation of Livestock.

She stayed at Iowa State as a faculty member, and became a distinguished professor there in 2011. She has been director of graduate education in statistics at Iowa State since 2004, and served as associate provost from 2000 to 2004. Since 2007 she has also held an adjunct position at the Pontifical Catholic University of Chile, and since 2009 she has held another adjunct position at the University of the Republic. She is a Director at the Center for Statistics and Applications in Forensic Evidence. The center was established in 2015 as a way to apply more objective science in the forensics field when dealing with human evidence.

During her 26-year career, Alicia Carriquiry has developed statistical methods to better measure food consumption, specifically, nutrient intake. Her work has also focused on mental health issues, which includes leading an ongoing effort by National Academy of Medicine to evaluate Veterans Affairs mental health services. Carriquiry has worked with various government and health agencies around the world to improve health and nutrition.

== Awards and honors ==
Carriquiry was elected as a member of the International Statistical Institute in 1995. She became a fellow of the American Statistical Association in 1999, and of the Institute of Mathematical Statistics in 2006. In 2016, she was elected to the National Academy of Medicine. She serves on the board of directors for the International Society for Bayesian Analysis. In 2018 Carriquiry was recipient of the American Statistical Association's Founders Award.
