= CEREMADE =

Research centre in Mathematics at Paris Dauphine University

Coordinates: 48.8701°N 2.2737°E

CEREMADE (Centre de recherche en mathématiques de la décision)
- Type: Research center in applied mathematics
- Established: 1970
- Location: Paris, France
- Director: Mathieu Lewin
- Website: www.ceremade.dauphine.fr

The CEREMADE (CEntre de REcherche en MAthématiques de la DÉcision, French for Research Centre in Mathematics of Decision) is a research centre in applied mathematics within Université Paris-Dauphine. It was created in 1970.

== Structure ==
The centre has about 75 permanent members and around 150 staff in total. It is structured in 3 main research areas.

=== Mathematics of economics and finance ===
Covering economics, mathematical finance, insurance, risk and game theory. CEREMADE has strong links to the Paris Dauphine University Institute of Finance, the Europlace Institute of Finance and the Risk Foundation. The institute offers various masters programmes in actuarial science and finance.

=== Nonlinear analysis ===
Covering nonlinear partial differential equations, optimal transport theory, dynamical systems, control theory, scientific computing and numerical analysis across many applied areas.

Notable staff include Ivar Ekeland, María J. Esteban, Mathieu Lewin and Irène Waldspurger.

=== Probability and statistics ===
The probability and statistics group research areas include Bayesian statistics and Markov chain Monte Carlo, as well as the study of models of statistical mechanics.

Notable staff include Christian Robert, Judith Rousseau and Cristina Toninelli.
