= Parzen Prize =

The Emanuel and Carol Parzen Prize for Statistical Innovation, known in brief as the Parzen Prize, is awarded biennially by the Department of Statistics at Texas A&M University to North American mathematicians to recognize their outstanding and influential contributions to the development of statistical methods and that the winners received their PhD at least 25 years prior to the award. It is named after the mathematician and statistician Emanuel Parzen (1929–2016).

The award consists of $1,000 and travel expenses to College Station, Texas, where the winner speaks at the award ceremony.

== List of winners ==
- 1994 Grace Wahba
- 1996 Donald Rubin
- 1998 Bradley Efron
- 2000 C. R. Rao
- 2002 David R. Brillinger
- 2004 Jerome H. Friedman
- 2006 Alan E. Gelfand
- 2008 Nancy Reid and Marvin Zelen
- 2010 Roger Koenker
- 2012 Adrian Raftery
- 2014 Trevor Hastie
- 2016 William S. Cleveland
- 2018 Bin Yu
- 2022 Herman Chernoff and Peter McCullagh
- 2024 Christian Genest
