= David Wishart =

David Wishart may refer to:

- David S. Wishart (born 1961), Canadian bioinformatician
- D. M. G. Wishart (1928–2003), British statistician
