= Kafadar =

Kafadar is a Turkish surname. Notable people with the surname include:

- Cemal Kafadar (born 1954), professor of Turkish studies at Harvard University
- Karen Kafadar, American statistician and president of American Statistical Association
