= Marina Vannucci =

Italian statistician

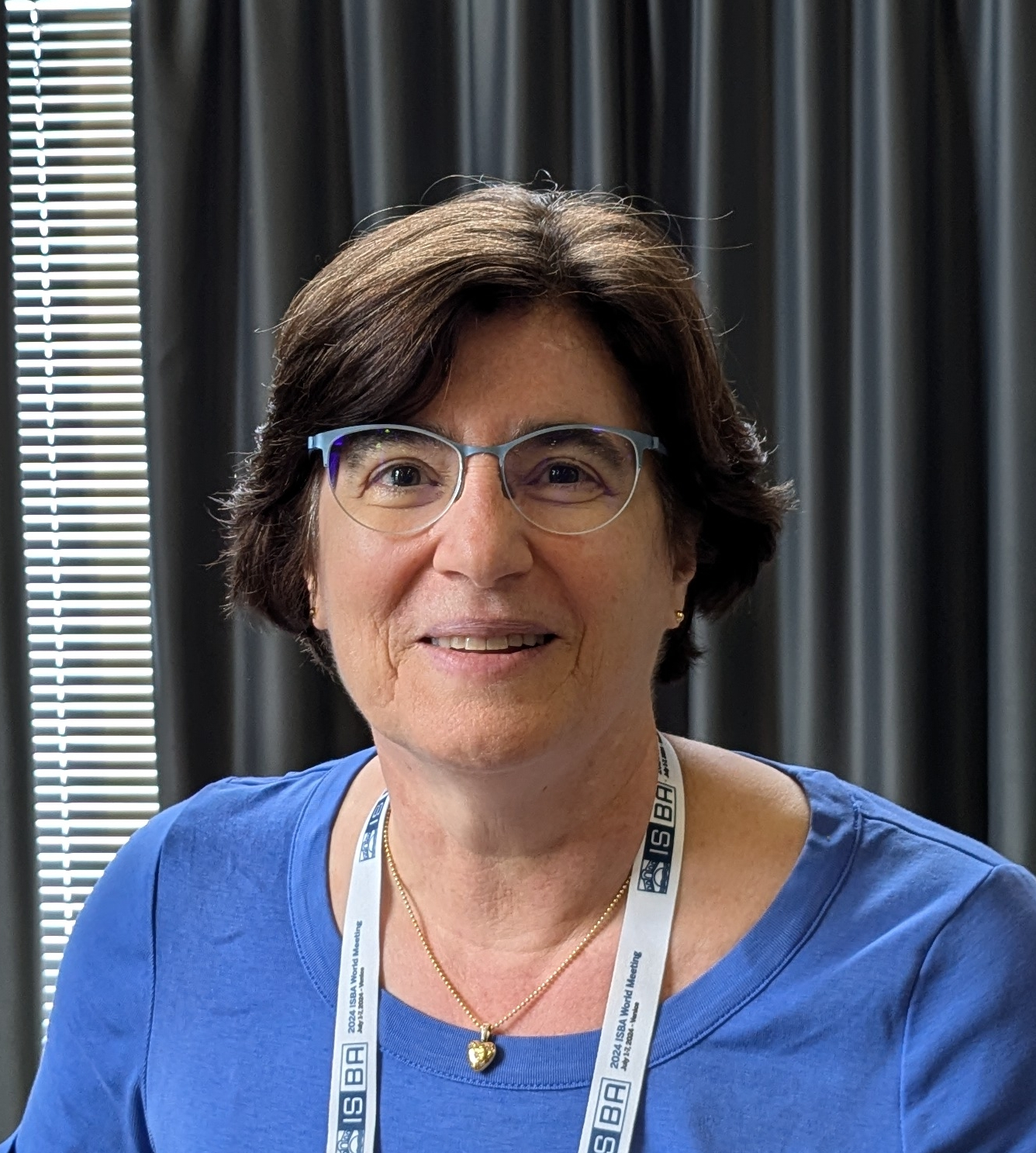
- Marina Vannucci in 2024
- Education: University of Florence
- Scientific career
- Fields: Statistics
- Institutions: Rice University
- Thesis: On the Application of Wavelets in Statistics (1996)
- Doctoral advisor: Antonio Moro

Marina Vannucci (born 1966) is an Italian statistician, the Noah Harding Professor and Chair of Statistics at Rice University, the past president of the International Society for Bayesian Analysis, and the former editor-in-chief of Bayesian Analysis. Topics in her research include wavelets, feature selection, and cluster analysis in Bayesian statistics.

== Education and career ==
Vannucci earned a bachelor's degree in mathematics in 1992, from the University of Florence. She completed her doctorate in statistics in 1996 at the same institution. Her dissertation, supervised by Antonio Moro, was On the Application of Wavelets in Statistics. After postdoctoral research at the University of Kent, she joined the faculty at Texas A&M University in 1998, and moved to Rice in 2007.

She was editor-in-chief of Bayesian Analysis for 2013–2015, and was elected president of the International Society for Bayesian Analysis for the 2018 term.

== Awards and honors ==
Vannucci is a fellow of the American Statistical Association (2006), the Institute of Mathematical Statistics (2009), the American Association for the Advancement of Science (2012), and the International Society for Bayesian Analysis (2014), and an elected member of the International Statistical Institute (2007). The citation for her IMS fellowship credits her "for fundamental contributions to the theory and practice of Bayesian methods for variable selection, and of wavelet-based modeling, and for mentorship of young researchers". She was given the Noah Harding Chair in 2016.
