= Sujit Sahu =

Indian statistician

Sujit K Sahu is a statistician who is a professor of statistics, mathematics and S3RI at the University of Southampton. He has contributed to practical Bayesian modelling.

== Early life and education ==
Sahu received a BSc in statistics from Presidency College, University of Calcutta (1984-1989) and a Master of Statistics from the Indian Statistical Institute, Calcutta (1987-1989).

He has a PhD in statistics from the University of Connecticut and previously worked at the University of Cambridge (1994-1996) and Cardiff University (1997-1999) before joining the University of Southampton in 1999.

== Work ==
Sahu worked on an EPSRC funded research project to develop methodology in both air pollution and health outcome data modelling and their integration. In addition, Sahu worked as a co-investigator on a NERC funded research grant to develop statistical models to study nutrient dynamics in annual and seasonal periods.

Professor Sujit Sahu has collaborated on methodological spatial statistics projects with Alan Gelfand and David Holland.

He has also worked on an EPSRC funded (2010-2012), cross-disciplinary research project titled "MetSim: A Hospital Simulation Support Tool" with Paul Harper, Cardiff University, the Met Office, and the Southampton University Hospital Trust. His statistical work as part of this project included a Bayesian model for forecasting the number of hospital admissions and was piloted by the Met Office for use by several UK hospitals.

== Publications ==
His full list of google citations can be found here .
