= Stephen John Penneck =

British Statistician

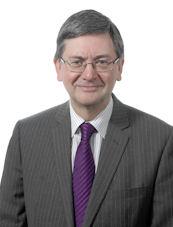
- Stephen Penneck in 2012
- Occupation: Statistician
- Employer: International Statistical Institute

Stephen Penneck is a British statistician who has made significant contributions to the field of official statistics. He served as the President of the International Statistical Institute from 2021 to 2023, having previously served as its Vice President from 2015. He was also the President of the International Association for Official Statistics (IAOS) from 2011 to 2013.

Penneck began his career in economic statistics, and later moved on to statistical governance. His early educational background includes a Bachelor of Science degree in Economics and Statistics, which he obtained from University of Southampton in 1972, and a Master's degree in Econometrics, which he obtained from University of Birmingham in 1973. He has held several senior management positions in official statistics in the United Kingdom, where he was responsible for surveys and for methodological advice. He retired in September 2012 as the Director General of the Office for National Statistics, the UK's national statistical institute.

From 2013 to 2021, Penneck chaired the International Statistical Institute's Advisory Board on Ethics. He also served as the Editor-in-Chief of the Statistical Journal of the IAOS from 2012 to 2013. In recognition of his contributions to the field of official statistics, he was made an Honorary Officer for Official Statistics at the Royal Statistical Society, a position he held from 2018 to 2021. He is also a Fellow of the Royal Statistical Society, and a Chartered Statistician.

Penneck has published articles and given lectures on a range of topics in official statistics, including economic statistics, open data, and governance, trust, and ethics. He has contributed internationally to International Statistical Institute workshops and regional conferences, and has organized sessions at the International Association for Official Statistics conferences and International Statistical Institute's World Statistics Congresses.

In addition to his work in official statistics, Penneck has also been actively involved in the governance of his local community. He was an elected local government councillor for 20 years in the London Borough where he lives. He has also been involved in the organisation as a trustee of the local Sutton Music Festival.
