= Computational Statistics & Data Analysis =

- Discipline: Statistics
- Language: English
- Edited by: Ana Maria Colubi, Stephen Lee, Michele Guindani

Publication details
- History: 1983–present
- Publisher: Elsevier on behalf of the International Association for Statistical Computing (United States)
- Frequency: Monthly
- Impact factor: 1.4 (2015)

Standard abbreviations
- ISO 4: Comput. Stat. Data Anal.
- MathSciNet: Comput. Statist. Data Anal.

Indexing
- CODEN: CSDADW
- ISSN: 0167-9473
- LCCN: 84642334
- OCLC no.: 09415738

Links
- Journal homepage; Online access

Computational Statistics & Data Analysis is a monthly peer-reviewed scientific journal covering research on and applications of computational statistics and data analysis. The journal was established in 1983 and is the official journal of the International Association for Statistical Computing, a section of the International Statistical Institute.

== See also ==
- List of statistics journals
