= Sonia Petrone =

Italian mathematical statistician

Sonia Petrone is an Italian mathematical statistician, known for her work in Bayesian statistics, including use of Bernstein polynomials for nonparametric methods in Bayesian statistics.^{[RBP]}^{[BDE]}^{[CPP]} With Patrizia Campagnoli and Giovanni Petris she is the author of the book Dynamic Linear Models with R (Springer, 2009).^{[DLM]}

== Education and career ==
Petrone earned a laurea in economic and social sciences from Bocconi University. She completed her Ph.D. in 1989 at the University of Trento. After working at the University of Pavia from 1991 to 1998, and at the University of Insubria from 1998 to 2001, she became a full professor of statistics at Bocconi University.

Petrone was the president of the International Society for Bayesian Analysis for the 2014 term. She was a co-editor of the journal Bayesian Analysis (2010–2014) and the editor of the journal Statistical Science for 2020–2022.

== Recognition ==
With Sara Wade and Silvia Mongelluzzo, Petrone won the Lindley Prize of the International Society for Bayesian Analysis in 2010. She was a Medallion Lecturer of the Institute of Mathematical Statistics for 2018. She is also a Fellow of the International Society for Bayesian Analysis, and an Elected Member of the International Statistical Institute. She was named to the 2022 class of Fellows of the Institute of Mathematical Statistics, for "significant and impacting contributions to the foundations of Bayesian statistics and Bayesian nonparametric inference and prediction, as well as long-standing professional service and dedicated mentoring throughout her career".

== Selected publications ==
=== Articles ===
RBP.	Petrone, Sonia (1999), "Random Bernstein polynomials", Scandinavian Journal of Statistics, 26 (3): 373–393, doi:10.1111/1467-9469.00155, MR 1712051, S2CID 122387975

BDE.	Petrone, Sonia (1999), "Bayesian density estimation using Bernstein polynomials", The Canadian Journal of Statistics, 27 (1): 105–126, doi:10.2307/3315494, JSTOR 3315494, MR 1703623, S2CID 122104079

CPP.	Petrone, Sonia; Wasserman, Larry (2002), "Consistency of Bernstein polynomial posteriors", Journal of the Royal Statistical Society, 64 (1): 79–100, doi:10.1111/1467-9868.00326, MR 1881846

=== Book ===
DLM.	Petris, Giovanni; Petrone, Sonia; Campagnoli, Patrizia (2009), Dynamic Linear Models with R, Use R!, New York: Springer, p. xiv+251, doi:10.1007/b135794, ISBN 978-0-387-77237-0, MR 2730074
