= Fabrizio Ruggeri =

Italian statistician

Fabrizio Ruggeri is an Italian statistician. His work focusses on Bayesian methods, specifically robustness and stochastic process inference. He has done innovative work on the sensitivity of Bayesian methods and incompletely specified priors. He has also worked on Bayesian wavelet methods, and on a vast variety of applications to industrial problems. His publications include well over 150 refereed papers and book chapters, as well as six books.

== Education and career ==
Ruggeri was born in Reggio nell'Emilia in northern Italy on 1 May 1956. He received his B.Sc. in mathematics at the University of Milan in 1982. From 1983 to 1988, he took on a series of jobs in the industry. He moved to the US to continue study in 1988, receiving a M.Sc. in statistics from Carnegie Mellon University in 1989, and his PhD in statistics from Duke University in 1994. In 1988, he also became Researcher at Consiglio Nazionale delle Ricerche (CNR – National Research Council) at Istituto di Matematica Applicata e Tecnologie Informatiche (IMATI – Institute of Applied Mathematics and Information Technology) in Milano, Italy, where he spent all his career until his formal, but not substantial, retirement in May 2023. Between December 2001 and May 2023, Ruggeri held the position of Research Director, (equivalent to Full Professor in universities).

Ruggeri has had several visiting researcher and adjunct appointments at universities and institutes around the world including: Adjunct Faculty member at the Polytechnic University of Milan between 1995 and 2003; Faculty member of Ph.D. programs in Mathematics and Statistics at University of Pavia and University of Milano Bicocca (1999-2024); Adjunct Professor (2013-2022), Queensland University of Technology, Brisbane, Australia; Visiting Faculty, Business School, George Washington University, USA (Fall 2014 and Spring 2024); Program Leader, SAMSI, Durham, USA (August 2019-May 2020); Chair of Excellence at University Carlos III and ICMAT (Comunidad de Madrid, Spain May -October 2017); Foreign Faculty member (2012-2020) of the Ph.D. program in Statistics, University of Valparaiso, Chile; Research Associate, Electricité de France, Paris, France (September -October 2016).

Since retirement in May 2023, Ruggeri has been a Senior Fellow at CNR-IMATI. He is also an Academic Advisor (2023-2028) at the Institute of Statistical Sciences, Academia Sinica, Taipei, Taiwan.

Ruggeri is an elected member of the International Statistical Institute (ISI) and a fellow of the American Statistical Association (ASA), the International Society for Bayesian Analysis (ISBA) and the Institute of Mathematical Statistics (IMS). He is the first recipient of the Zellner Medal by ISBA. He was the president of the ISBA in 2012 and the European Network for Business and Industrial Statistics (ENBIS) for the period 2005–2006. He was also President of the International Society for Business and Industrial Statistics (ISBIS) for the period 2019-2021. He was one of the Vice-Presidents of the ISI for the period 2017-2021 and he was President-Elect for the period 2023-2025; he is currently President for the period 2025-2027. Ruggeri is a former Editor-in-Chief of Applied Stochastic Models in Business and Industry and is one of the Founding Editors of Wiley StatsRef - Statistics Reference Online.

== Publications ==
Books:

- Gleaton, J.U., Han, D., Lynch, J.D., Ng, H.K.T. and Ruggeri, F. (2023). Statistical Fiber Bundle Models and its Applications, Springer, New York, USA.
- Kenett, R., Ruggeri, F. and Faltin, F. Eds. (2018), Analytic Methods in Systems and Software Testing, Wiley, Chichester, UK.
- Rios Insua, D., Ruggeri, F. and Wiper, M. (2012), Bayesian Analysis of Stochastic Processes Models, Wiley, Chichester, UK.
- Faltin, F., Kenett, R. and Ruggeri, F. Eds. (2012), Statistical Methods in Healthcare Practice, Wiley, Chichester, UK.
- Rios Insua, D. and Ruggeri, F. Eds. (2000), Robust Bayesian Analysis, Lecture Notes in Statistics, vol. 152, Springer, New York, USA.
- Berger, J., Betrò, B., Moreno, E., Pericchi, L.R., Ruggeri, F., Salinetti, G. and Wasserman, L. Eds. (1996), Bayesian Robustness, Lecture Notes IMS, vol. 29, Institute of Mathematical Statistics, Hayward, USA.

Published Encyclopedias:

- Kenett, R., Longford, N., Piegorsch, W. and Ruggeri, F. Eds. (2014-ongoing), WileyStatsRef: Statistics Reference Online, Wiley, Chichester, UK.
- Ruggeri, F., Kenett, R. and Faltin, F. Eds.(2007), Encyclopedia of Statistics in Quality and Reliability, Wiley, Chichester, UK.

Selected Papers in Journals:

- Soyer, R., Ruggeri, F., Rios Insua, D., Pierce, C. and Guevara, C. (2025), An Adversarial Risk Analysis framework for Software Release. To appear in Risk Analysis.
- Gallego, V., Naveiro, R., Redondo, A., Rios Insua, D. and Ruggeri, F. (2024), Protecting Classifiers From Attacks. Statistical Science, 39, 449-468.
- Lopes de Oliveira, G., Argiento, R., Loschi, R.H., Martins Assuncao, R., Ruggeri, F. and Branco, M. (2022), Bias correction in clustered underreported data. Bayesian Analysis, 17, 95-126.
- Gonzalez-Ortega, J., Rios Insua, D., Ruggeri, F. and Soyer, R. (2021), Hypothesis Testing in Presence of Adversaries. The American Statistician, 75, 31-40.
- Ruggeri, F., Sanchez-Sanchez, M., Sordo, M.A. and Suarez-Llorens, A. (2020), On a new class of multivariate prior distributions: theory and application in reliability. Bayesian Analysis, 16, 31-60.
- Rios Insua, D., Ruggeri, F., Soyer, R. and Wilson S. (2020), Advances in Bayesian Decision Making in Reliability. European Journal of Operational Research, 282, 1-18.
- Ekin, T., Ieva, F., Ruggeri, F. and Soyer, R. (2018), Statistical Medical Fraud Assessment: Exposition to an Emerging Field. International Statistical Review, 86, 379-402.
- Joshi, C., Ruggeri, F. and Wilson, S.P. (2018), Prior Robustness for Bayesian implementation of the Fault Tree Analysis. IEEE Transactions on Reliability, 67, 170-183.
- Rios Insua, D., Ruggeri, F., Soyer, R. and Rasines, D.G. (2018), Adversarial issues in reliability. European Journal of Operational Research, 266, 1113-1119.
- Arias, P., Ruggeri, F. and Suarez-Llorens, A. (2016), New classes of priors based on stochastic orders and distortion functions. Bayesian Analysis, 11, 1107-1136.
- Trucco, P., Cagno, E., Ruggeri, F. and Grande, O. (2008), A Bayesian Belief Network Approach for modelling Human and Organisational Factors Risk Analysis: A Case Study in Maritime Industry, Reliability Engineering and Systems Safety, 93, 845-856.
- Paddock, S., Ruggeri, F., Lavine, M., and West, M. (2003), Randomised Polya tree models for nonparametric Bayesian inference, Statistica Sinica, 13, 443-460.
- Ruggeri, F. and Vidakovic, B. (2001), BAMS method: theory and simulations, Sankhya, B 63, 234-249.
- Wiper, M., Rıos Insua, D., and Ruggeri, F. (2001), Mixtures of gamma distributions with applications, Journal of Computational and Graphical Statistics 10, 440- 454.
- Fortini, S. and Ruggeri, F. (1995), On defining neighbourhoods of measures through the concentration functions, Sankhya, A 56, 444-457.
- Ruggeri, F. and Wasserman, L. (1993), Infinitesimal Sensitivity of Posterior Distributions, Canadian Journal of Statistics 21, 195-203.
