= Institute of Statisticians =

British statistics organization (1948–1993)

The Institute of Statisticians was a British professional organization founded in 1948 to protect the interests of professional statisticians. It was originally named The Association of Incorporated Statisticians Limited, but this was later changed. The institute was formed after the Royal Economic Society prevented a 1947 extension to the royal charter of the Royal Statistical Society which would have allowed it to carry out examinations.

The Institute of Statisticians attempted to obtain a royal charter of its own in 1978 and this led to discussions with the Royal Statistical Society about a possible merger. Talks foundered over disagreement on how to arrange the various membership categories. Within a few years, however, the talks were revisited, and on 1 January 1993, the two organisations merged, becoming simply the Royal Statistical Society.

From 1950 the institute published a journal, first called The Incorporated Statistician (ISSN 14669404) then renamed The Statistician (ISSN 0039-0526) in 1962, before being subsumed into the Journal of the Royal Statistical Society as Series D upon the merger in 1993.

== See also ==
- Royal Statistical Society
- List of learned societies
- List of British professional bodies
