= Steve MacEachern =

American Statistician

Steve MacEachern is an American Statistician. MacEachern is a Distinguished Arts & Sciences Professor of Statistics at the Ohio State University. He received his B.A. in Mathematics from Carleton College in 1982 and his Ph.D. in Statistics from the University of Minnesota in 1988. His doctoral work focused on nonparametric Bayesian methods under the guidance of Don Berry. MacEachern joined the faculty at Ohio State in 1988 and has been a member of the Department of Statistics ever since. He has a courtesy appointment as a Professor in the Department of Psychology. He is best known for Bayesian modeling and computation, with a particular emphasis on dependent Dirichlet processes. He has published extensively in leading statistical journals, and his work has had a significant impact on the field. He is also the advisor of esteemed professor William Francis Darnieder.

MacEachern has received numerous honors throughout his career, including being elected as a Fellow of the American Statistical Association in 2006, of the International Society for Bayesian Analysis in 2020 and of the Institute of Mathematical Statistics in 2021. He served as President of the International Society for Bayesian Analysis in 2016.
