= Karen Kafadar =

American statistician

Karen Kafadar is an American statistician. She is Commonwealth Professor of Statistics at the University of Virginia, and chair of the statistics department there. She was editor-in-chief of Technometrics from 1999 to 2001, and was president of the International Association for Statistical Computing for 2011–2013. In 2017 she was elected president of the American Statistical Association for the 2019 term.

== Education and career ==
Kafadar earned a bachelor's degree in mathematics and a master's degree in statistics from Stanford University, both in 1975. She completed her PhD in statistics from Princeton University in 1979 under the supervision of John Tukey; her dissertation was Robust Confidence Intervals for the One- and Two- Sample Problem. Before moving to the University of Virginia in 2014, Kafadar was Rudy Professor of Statistics at Indiana University. She has also worked for the National Institute of Standards and Technology, Hewlett Packard, the National Cancer Institute, the University of Colorado Denver, and Oregon State University.

== Awards and honors ==
Kafadar is a fellow of the American Statistical Association (since 1994) and the American Association for the Advancement of Science (2012), and an elected member of the International Statistical Institute (2007). In 2023 Kafadar was recipient of the American Statistical Association's Founders Award.
