= Igor Prünster =

Italian statistician

- Scientific career
- Fields: Bayesian statistics
- Institutions: Bocconi University
- Thesis: Random probability measures derived from increasing additive processes and their application to Bayesian statistics (2003)
- Doctoral advisor: Eugenio Regazzini
- Website: https://mypage.unibocconi.eu/igorpruenster/index.php?IdUte=187032&idr=26712&lingua=eng

Igor Prünster is an Italian statistican who studies Bayesian inference, in particular Bayesian nonparametrics and Bayesian asymptotics. He is professor of Statistics at Bocconi University. As of 2026, he is the editor-in-chief of the academic journal Bayesian Analysis. He was the president of the International Society for Bayesian Analysis in 2021.

== Honours and awards ==
- 2015: Fellow of the Institute of Mathematical Statistics
- 2018: Fellow of the International Society for Bayesian Analysis
- 2019: Fellow of the American Statistical Association
