= Irène Waldspurger =

French mathematician

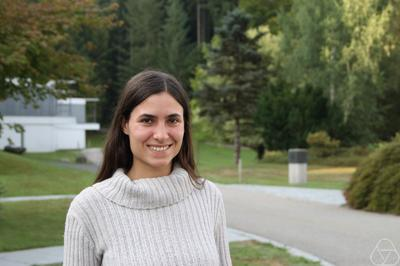
- Waldspurger at Oberwolfach in 2015
- Education: École Normale Supérieure
- Known for: phase retrieval, wavelets
- Scientific career
- Workplaces: Paris Sciences et Lettres University; CEREMADE; MIT
- Website: Irène Waldspurger

Irène Waldspurger is a French mathematician and a researcher at the Research Centre in Mathematics of Decision (CEREMADE) where her research focuses on algorithms to solve phase problems, a class of problem relevant for a large number of imaging techniques used in science and medicine. She is also a professor at Paris Sciences et Lettres University.

== Education and career ==
Waldspurger competed for France in the 2006 International Mathematical Olympiad, winning a bronze medal.

Waldspurger was a student of the prestigious Ecole Normale Superieure, in Paris, France, where she was ranked first at the entrance exam in 2008. She pursued her doctoral research at École Normale Supérieure, working on phase retrieval techniques using wavelet transforms under the supervision of Stephane Mallat, which she completed in 2015. She then joined the Massachusetts Institute of Technology for a postdoctoral fellowship, before returning to France in 2017 to join the French National Centre for Scientific Research.

== Recognition ==
In 2020, Waldspurger was one of the Peccot Lecturers and Peccot Prize winners of the College de France, and won the CNRS Bronze Medal.
