= Harvey Goldstein =

British statistician (1939–2020)

- Born: 30 October 1939; Whitechapel, London, UK
- Died: 9 April 2020 (aged 80)
- Citizenship: United Kingdom
- Education: Manchester University; University College London
- Known for: Multilevel models
- Awards: Guy Medal (Silver, 1998); Fellow of the British Academy (1996)
- Scientific career
- Fields: Statistician
- Workplaces: National Children's Bureau; Institute of Education; University of Bristol

Harvey Goldstein (30 October 1939 – 9 April 2020) was a British statistician known for his contributions to multilevel modelling methodology, statistical software, social statistics, and for applying this to educational assessment and league tables.

Goldstein was born in Whitechapel, London to a Jewish family. He was professor of social statistics in the Centre for Multilevel Modelling at the University of Bristol. From 1977 to 2005, he was professor of statistical methods at the Institute of Education of the University of London. He was author of a monograph on multilevel statistical models.

He came from a left-wing family, and as a teenager he briefly joined the Young Communist League. He was elected a fellow of the British Academy in 1996 and awarded the Guy Medal in silver by the Royal Statistical Society in 1998.

He died on 9 April 2020.

It was reported that his death was due to COVID-19 during the COVID-19 pandemic in England.

== See also ==
- MLwiN (software)
