= Raquel Prado =

Venezuelan Bayesian statistician

Raquel Prado (born 1970) is a Venezuelan Bayesian statistician. She is a professor of statistics in the Jack Baskin School of Engineering of the University of California, Santa Cruz, and has been elected president of the International Society for Bayesian Analysis for the 2019 term.

== Contributions ==
Prado specializes in Bayesian inference for time series data. With Mike West, she is the author of the book Time Series: Modeling, Computation, and Inference (Texts in Statistical Science, CRC Press, 2010).

== Education and career ==
Prado was born on 24 April 1970, in Caracas, and graduated from Simón Bolívar University in 1993. She completed her Ph.D. in statistics at Duke University in 1998. Her dissertation, Latent Structure in Non-Stationary Time Series, was supervised by Mike West.

After completing her Ph.D. she returned to Simón Bolívar University as a faculty member before moving to Santa Cruz.

== Recognition ==
In 1999, Prado and her co-authors Andrew Krystal and Mike West won the Outstanding Statistical Application Award of the American Statistical Association for their work on statistical analysis of electroencephalography data. In 2013, Prado became a Fellow of the American Statistical Association.
