= Sylvia Frühwirth-Schnatter =

Austrian academic statistician

- Born: 21 May 1959 (age 67); Vienna, Austria
- Education: TU Wien
- Known for: Bayesian inference, Mixture distribution, Markov chain Monte Carlo
- Scientific career
- Fields: Statistics
- Workplaces: Vienna University of Economics and Business
- Website: statmath.wu.ac.at/~fruehwirth/

Sylvia Frühwirth-Schnatter (born 21 May 1959) is an Austrian statistician and professor of applied statistics and econometrics at the Vienna University of Economics and Business. She is known for her research in Bayesian analysis. In 2020 she was the President of the International Society for Bayesian Analysis.

== Biography ==
Sylvia Frühwirth-Schnatter was born in 1959 in the Brigittenau district of Vienna. After attaining her doctorate in engineering mathematics from the TU Wien she held numerous academic positions, including professor of statistics at the Johannes Kepler University Linz. Since 2011, she is full professor of statistics at the Vienna University of Economics and Business. Since 2014 she is Full Member of the Division of Humanities and the Social Sciences of the Austrian Academy of Sciences. Sylvia Frühwirth-Schnatter is married and mother of three sons.

== Research ==
In her research, Sylvia Frühwirth-Schnatter inter alia explores ideas relating to Bayesian econometrics, such as efficient Markov chain Monte Carlo methods and Bayesian analysis of finite mixture models. In 2014, she co-developed a Bayesian approach to exploratory factor analysis with James Heckman. She is a quadruple winner of the WU Best Paper Award and recipient of the DeGroot Prize bestowed by the International Society for Bayesian Analysis for her monograph on Markov switching models.

== Selected publications ==
- Frühwirth-Schnatter, S. (2006). Finite mixture and Markov switching models. Springer Science & Business Media. ISBN 978-0-387-35768-3
- Conti, G., Frühwirth-Schnatter, S., Heckman, J. J., & Piatek, R. (2014). Bayesian exploratory factor analysis. Journal of econometrics, 183(1), 31–57.
- Frühwirth‐Schnatter, S. (1994). Data augmentation and dynamic linear models. Journal of time series analysis, 15(2), 183–202.
