= Merlise A. Clyde =

American statistician

Merlise Aycock Clyde
- Education: Oregon State University (BS); University of Alberta; University of California, Riverside; University of Minnesota (PhD)
- Scientific career
- Fields: Statistics
- Workplaces: Duke University
- Thesis: Bayesian Optimal Designs for Approximate Normality (1994)
- Doctoral advisor: Kathryn Chaloner

Merlise Aycock Clyde is an American statistician known for her work in model averaging for Bayesian statistics. She is a professor of Statistical Science at Duke University and served as chair of the department from 2013-2019, and 2025-present. She was president of the International Society for Bayesian Analysis (ISBA) in 2013, and chair of the Section on Bayesian Statistical Science of the American Statistical Association in 2018.

== Education ==
Clyde graduated from Oregon State University in 1985 with a Bachelor of Science in Forestry. She earned two master's degrees, one from the University of Alberta in 1986 in Forest Biometrics and another from the University of California, Riverside in 1988 in Statistics, before completing her Ph.D. at the University of Minnesota in 1993 in Statistics. Her dissertation, supervised by Kathryn Chaloner, was titles Bayesian Optimal Designs for Approximate Normality, which received the Savage Award for outstanding dissertation in Bayesian econometrics and statistics in 1994.

== Awards and honors ==
Clyde is a fellow of the American Statistical Association, of the International Society for Bayesian Analysis, and of the Institute of Mathematical Statistics. She was one of two winners of the Zellner Medal of the ISBA in 2016 "for their outstanding service to ISBA".
