= Lindley distribution =

Probability distribution

Lindley
- Parameters: scale: $\theta>0$
- Support: $x\in [0,\infty)$
- PDF: $\frac{\theta^2}{\theta+1} (1+x)e^{-\theta x}$
- CDF: $1 - \frac{\theta+1+\theta x}{\theta+1}e^{-\theta x}$
- Mean: $\frac{\theta+2}{\theta(\theta+1)}$
- Variance: $\frac{2(\theta+3)}{\theta^2(\theta+1)}$
- Skewness: $\frac{6(\theta+4)}{\theta^3(\theta+1)}$
- Excess kurtosis: $\frac{24(\theta+5)}{\theta^4(\theta+1)}$
- CF: $\frac{\theta^2(\theta+1-ix)}{(\theta+1)(\theta-ix)^2}$

In probability theory and statistics, the Lindley distribution is a continuous probability distribution for nonnegative-valued random variables. The distribution is named after Dennis Lindley.

The Lindley distribution is used to describe the lifetime of processes and devices. In engineering, it has been used to model system reliability.

The distribution can be viewed as a mixture of the Erlang distribution (with $k=2$) and an exponential distribution.

== Definition ==
The probability density function of the Lindley distribution is:

$$f(x;\theta) = \frac{\theta^2}{\theta+1} (1+x)e^{-\theta x} \quad \theta, x \geq 0,$$

where $\theta$ is the scale parameter of the distribution. The cumulative distribution function is:

$$F(x;\theta) = 1 - \frac{\theta+1+\theta x}{\theta+1}e^{-\theta x}$$

for $x \in [0,\infty).$
