= Wombling =

In statistics, Wombling is any of a number of techniques used for identifying zones of rapid change, typically in some quantity as it varies across some geographical or Euclidean space. It is named for statistician William H. Womble who published an article on the Differential Systematics in Science to highlight the importance of studying rates of change in genetics.

In modern statistics, wombling has been largely developed by statisticians Sudipto Banerjee and Alan E. Gelfand as a methodology to infer the rates of change at points on spatial random fields along curves or boundaries. Wombling has also been applied to geographic maps, especially in public health research, to model or detect whether administrative boundaries represent zones of rapid change in health outcomes. This line of work has been formalized also as multiple testing problems for neighboring spatial effects. Bayesian wombling can be implemented using the R package nimblewomble available from CRAN.

The technique may be applied to gene frequency in a population of organisms, and to evolution of language.
