= María J. Esteban =

French mathematician

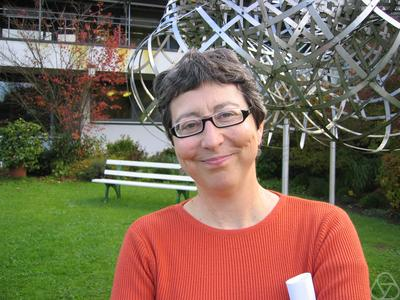
Esteban at the 2006 Oberwolfach workshop Mathematical and Numerical Aspects of Quantum Chemistry Problems

Maria J. Esteban (born 1956 at Alonsotegi) is a Spanish mathematician. In her research she studies nonlinear partial differential equations, mainly by the use of variational methods, with applications to physics and quantum chemistry. She has also worked on fluid-structure interaction.

== Education and career ==
After undergraduate studies at the University of the Basque Country (Bilbao), she did her PhD thesis at the Pierre and Marie Curie University (Paris), under the direction of Pierre-Louis Lions. After her thesis, she became full-time researcher at CNRS, where she holds now a position of emerita director of research. She is a member of CEREMADE, research center of the Université Paris-Dauphine.

== Service ==
Esteban was president of International Council for Industrial and Applied Mathematics for the 2015–2019 term. She was president of the Société de Mathématiques Appliquées et Industrielles from 2009 to 2012 and chair of the Applied Mathematics Committee of the European Mathematical Society in 2012 and 2013. She participated in the Forward Look on "Mathematics and Industry" funded by the European Science Foundation and is one of the launchers of the EU-MATHS-IN European network for industrial mathematics. She was member of the Abel Prize committee in 2014 and 2015.

== Recognition ==
She became a Fellow of the Society for Industrial and Applied Mathematics in 2016 "for distinguished research in partial differential equations and for advancing the profile of applied mathematics internationally." Esteban was an invited speaker at the 2018 International Congress of Mathematicians. In 2019, she received the SIAM Prize for Distinguished Service to the Profession, and became a member of the Academia Europaea. In 2020, she received the French Academy of Sciences' Prix Jacques-Louis-Lions, and in 2021, the Blaise Pascal Medal in Mathematics of the European Academy of Sciences. Since 2022 she is a Fellow of the International Science Council.

== Major publications ==
- Esteban, M. J.; Lions, P. L. (1982). "Existence and non-existence results for semilinear elliptic problems in unbounded domains". Proceedings of the Royal Society of Edinburgh. Section A: Mathematics. 93 (1–2): 1–14. doi:10.1017/s0308210500031607. ISSN 0308-2105. S2CID 123839832.
- Esteban, Maria J.; Lions, Pierre-Louis (1989). "Stationary Solutions of Nonlinear Schrödinger Equations with an External Magnetic Field". Partial Differential Equations and the Calculus of Variations. Boston, MA: Birkhäuser Boston. doi:10.1007/978-1-4615-9828-2_18. ISBN 978-1-4615-9830-5.
- Desjardins, B.; Esteban, M. J. (1 April 1999). "Existence of Weak Solutions for the Motion of Rigid Bodies in a Viscous Fluid". Archive for Rational Mechanics and Analysis. 146 (1): 59–71. Bibcode:1999ArRMA.146...59D. doi:10.1007/s002050050136. ISSN 0003-9527. S2CID 120322065.
- Desjardins, B; Esteban, M.J (1999). "On Weak Solutions for Fluid-Rigid Structure Interaction: Compressible and Incompressible Models". Communications in Partial Differential Equations. 25 (7–8): 263–285. doi:10.1080/03605300008821553. ISSN 0360-5302.
