= William S. Cleveland =

American computer scientist (1943–2026)

- Born: January 24, 1943; Sussex, New Jersey, U.S.
- Died: March 27, 2026 (aged 83)
- Citizenship: American
- Education: Princeton University; Yale University
- Known for: Dot plot; Local regression; S (programming language)
- Scientific career
- Fields: Statistics; Computer science
- Workplaces: Bell Labs (Murray Hill); Purdue University
- Thesis: Time series projections, theory and practice (1969)
- Doctoral advisor: Leonard Jimmie Savage

William Swain Cleveland II (January 24, 1943 – March 27, 2026) was an American computer scientist, professor of statistics and professor of computer science at Purdue University, known for his work on data visualization, particularly on nonparametric regression and local regression. He was one of the developers of the S programming language.

== Early life and career ==
Cleveland obtained his AB in Mathematics from Princeton University in the mid-1960s, graduating under William Feller. He then moved to Yale University for his PhD studies in statistics, graduating in 1969 under Leonard Jimmie Savage.

After graduation Cleveland started at Bell Labs, where he was a staff member of the Statistics Research Department and department head for 12 years. While at Bell Labs, he helped to develop the S programming language, a precursor to R. Eventually he moved to Purdue University, where he became Professor of Statistics and Courtesy Professor of Computer Science.

His research interests were in the fields of "data visualization, computer networking, machine learning, data mining, time series, statistical modeling, visual perception, environmental science, and seasonal adjustment." Cleveland is credited with defining and naming the field of data science, which he did in a 2001 publication.

== Retirement and death ==
Cleveland retired in 2025. He died on March 27, 2026, at the age of 83.

== Honors and awards ==
Cleveland received the Wilcoxon Award from Technometrics in 1975 and 1977. He received the Youden Prize from Technometrics in 1987 along with Richard A. Becker at Bell Labs for their paper Brushing scatterplots.

In 1982 he was elected as a Fellow of the American Statistical Association.

In 1996, he was named National Statistician of the Year by the Chicago chapter of the American Statistical Association. In 2016, Cleveland received the Lifetime Achievement Award in Graphics and Computing from the American Statistical Association, and the Parzen Prize for Statistical Innovation from Texas A&M University. In 2021, he was awarded an honorary doctorate by Hasselt University.

== Bibliography ==
=== Books ===
- Cleveland, William S. The elements of graphing data. Monterey, CA: Wadsworth Advanced Books and Software, 1985.
- Cleveland, William S.; McGill, Marylyn E. (1988). Dynamic graphics for statistics. The Wadsworth & Brooks-Cole statistics-probability series. Belmont, Calif: Wadsworth. ISBN 978-0-534-09144-6.
- Cleveland, William S. Visualizing data. Hobart Press, 1993.

=== Selected publications ===
- Cleveland, William S. "Robust locally weighted regression and smoothing scatterplots." Journal of the American statistical association 74.368 (1979): 829–836.
- Cleveland, William S., and Robert McGill. "Graphical perception: Theory, experimentation, and application to the development of graphical methods." Journal of the American statistical association 79.387 (1984): 531–554.
- Cleveland, William S., and Susan J. Devlin. "Locally weighted regression: an approach to regression analysis by local fitting." Journal of the American Statistical Association 83.403 (1988): 596–610.
- Cleveland, William S., Eric Grosse, and William M. Shyu. "Local regression models." Statistical models in S (1992): 309–376.
