= Womble (surname) =

Womble is a surname. Notable people with the surname include:

- David Womble (born 1977), English cricketer
- Larry W. Womble (1941–2020), American politician
- Royce Womble (1931–2016), American football player
- Trevor Womble (born 1951), English footballer
- Warren Womble (1920–2015), American basketball coach
