= Ingrid Van Keilegom =

Belgian statistician

Ingrid Van Keilegom (born 24 December 1971 in Antwerp) is a Belgian statistician. She is a professor of statistics at KU Leuven, and a part-time professor at the Université catholique de Louvain. Her research interests include survival analysis, non- and semiparametric regression, quantile regression, measurement errors, and mathematical statistics in general.

== Education and career ==
Van Keilegom earned a licentiate in mathematical sciences from Universitaire Instelling Antwerpen in 1993, a master's degree in biostatistics from Limburgs Universitair Centrum in 1998, and a doctorate in statistics from Limburgs Universitair Centrum in 1998. Her dissertation, Nonparametric estimation of the conditional distribution in regression with censored data, was supervised by Noël Veraverbeke.

After working as an assistant professor at Pennsylvania State University (1998–1999) and Eindhoven University of Technology (1999–2000), she returned to Belgium in 2000 with a position at the Université catholique de Louvain. In 2016 she switched her full professorship there to a part-time position, to take another full professorship at KU Leuven.

== Recognition ==
Ingrid Van Keilegom gave the IMS Medallion lecture at the 2023 Joint Statistical Meetings in Toronto, Canada. She was awarded an Honorary Doctorate from the University of A Coruña in Spain in 2022. She became an Elected member of the Royal Flemish Academy of Belgium for Science and the Arts in 2021. Van Keilegom has also been a Fellow of the American Statistical Association since 2013, and she was named a Fellow of the Institute of Mathematical Statistics in 2008 "for contributions to statistical theory and methodology, especially semi- and nonparametric regression, survival analysis, and empirical likelihood methods."
