= Thomas H. Leonard =

British statistician and author (1948–2023)

- Born: 24 March 1948; Devon, England, UK
- Died: 18 December 2023 (aged 75); Edinburgh, Scotland, UK
- Education: Imperial College London; University College London
- Scientific career
- Fields: Statistics
- Workplaces: University of Warwick (1972–1980); University of Wisconsin-Madison (1979–1996); University of Edinburgh (1995–2001)
- Doctoral advisor: Dennis Lindley

Thomas Hoskyns Leonard (24 March 1948 – 18 December 2023) was a British statistician. He obtained a doctorate in Statistics at the University of London and worked at the University of Warwick and the University of Wisconsin-Madison, before taking up the Chair of Statistics at the University of Edinburgh in 1995.

In 1972, Leonard co-founded the Department of Statistics at the University of Warwick. During Leonard's tenure (1980–1995) at the Department of Statistics at the University of Wisconsin-Madison, he worked on improving the Bayesian components of both the teaching and research programs, alongside Kam Wah Tsui and Michael Newton.

Leonard published on the Bayesian approach to categorical data analysis, as well as on function smoothing and prior informative density estimation, conditional Laplacian approximations for marginal inference and prediction, and the statistical modelling of log covariance matrices. He also worked on the applications of Bayesian methodology in geophysics, medicine, and psychometrics. He was one of the founders, in 1992, of the International Society for Bayesian Analysis, alongside Arnold Zellner and Gordon Kaufman.

Leonard's books include A Course in Categorical Data Analysis and Bayesian Methods: An Analysis for Statisticians and Interdisciplinary Researchers, the latter co-authored with his former doctoral student, John S. J. Hsu, At the University of Edinburgh, Leonard collaborated with Ian Main, Orestis Papasouliotis and others on publications in geophysics. He was also active during this period in the field of family medicine, contributing to articles on prevention of substance use disorders.

Alongside academic publications, he also appeared as an expert witness on statistics in multiple U.S. legal cases.

Leonard retired in 2001. He died on 18 December 2023.
