= Judith Rousseau =

French Bayesian statistician

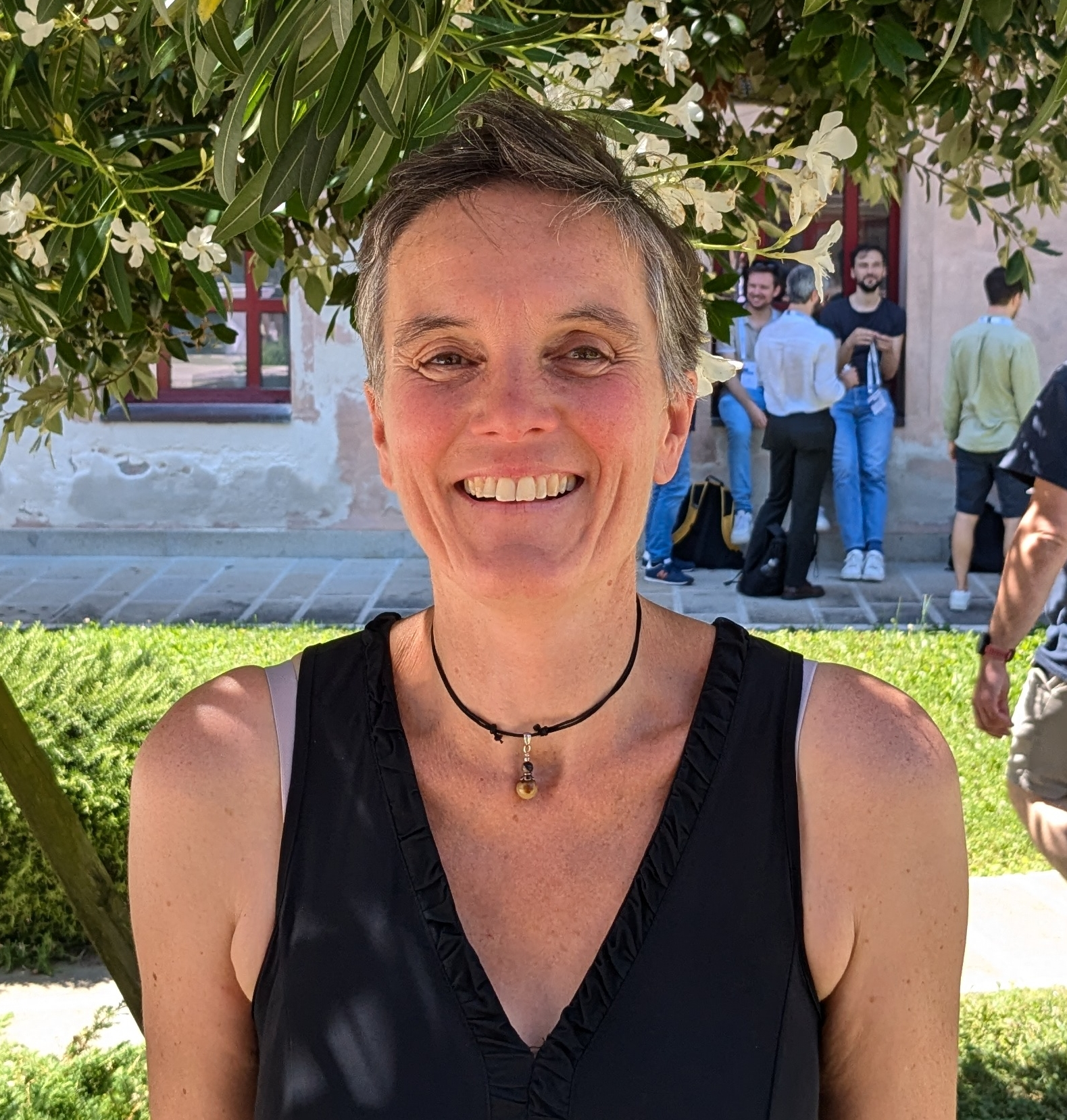
- Judith Rousseau in 2024
- Scientific career
- Fields: Statistics
- Institutions: Université Paris-Dauphine; University of Oxford; Paris Descartes University; ENSAE
- Thesis: Étude des propriétés asymptotiques des estimateurs de Bayes (1997)
- Doctoral advisors: Paul Deheuvels and Christian Robert

Judith Rousseau is a Bayesian statistician who studies frequentist properties of Bayesian methods. She is a professor of statistics at Université Paris-Dauphine. She was previously a professor at the University of Oxford, a Fellow of Jesus College, Oxford, and a professor at ENSAE Paris. She a Fellow of the Institute of Mathematical Statistics and a Fellow of the International Society for Bayesian Analysis.

== Education and career ==
Rousseau studied statistics and economics at ENSAE ParisTech, starting in pure mathematics but changing fields after taking a statistics class "because of all the interactions it has with other fields". She completed a doctorate in 1997 at Pierre and Marie Curie University. Her dissertation, Asymptotic properties of Bayes estimators, was supervised by Christian Robert.

She taught at Paris Descartes University from 1998 to 2004, Paris-Dauphine University beginning in 2004, and (while on leave from Paris-Dauphine) at ENSAE from 2009 to 2014. She became Professor of Statistics at Oxford in 2017, then returned to Paris-Dauphine in 2023.

== Recognition ==
In 2015 Rousseau won the inaugural Ethel Newbold Prize of the Bernoulli Society for Mathematical Statistics and Probability. The award recognizes a "recipient of any gender who is an outstanding statistical scientist for a body of work that represents excellence in research in mathematical statistics". The body of work for which Rousseau was recognized includes her work on infinite-dimensional variants of the Bernstein–von Mises theorem.

In 2019, she was awarded a European Research Council (ERC) Advance Grant for her project "General theory for Big Bayes".

As of 2026, she is president-elect of the International Society for Bayesian Analysis.
