= Bayesian Analysis (journal) =

- Discipline: Bayesian methods
- Language: English
- Edited by: Igor Prünster

Publication details
- History: 2006–present
- Publisher: International Society for Bayesian Analysis, distributed by Project Euclid
- Frequency: Quarterly
- Impact factor: 2.576 (2013)

Standard abbreviations
- ISO 4: Bayesian Anal.

Indexing
- ISSN: 1936-0975 (print); 1931-6690 (web)
- OCLC no.: 64254345

Links
- Journal homepage; Online access; Online archive

Bayesian Analysis is an open-access peer-reviewed scientific journal covering theoretical and applied aspects of Bayesian methods. It is published by the International Society for Bayesian Analysis and is hosted at the Project Euclid web site.

Bayesian Analysis is abstracted and indexed by Science Citation Index Expanded. According to the Journal Citation Reports, the journal has a 2011 impact factor of 1.650.

== Editors in chief ==
- 2004–2006: Rob Kass
- 2006–2009: Brad Carlin
- 2010–2012: Herbie Lee
- 2013–2015: Marina Vannucci
- 2016–2018: Bruno Sansó
- 2019–2021: Michele Guindani
- 2022–2024: Mark Steel
- 2025–2027: Igor Prünster
