= Huiyan Sang =

Chinese-American statistician

Huiyan Sang (Chinese: 桑辉艳) is a Chinese and American statistician whose research interests include spatial statistics, extreme values, multilevel models, and statistical computations with large data. She has also contributed to applications of statistics in studying additive manufacturing, invasive species, climate models, and educational evaluation. She is a professor of statistics at Texas A&M University.

Sang has a 2004 bachelor's degree from Peking University. She completed a Ph.D. at Duke University in 2008, with the dissertation Extreme value modeling for space-time data with meteorological applications supervised by Alan E. Gelfand. She has been a faculty member at Texas A&M University since 2008.

Sang was elected as a Fellow of the American Statistical Association in 2024.
