= Linda Sharples =

British statistician and professor

Linda D. Sharples
- Education: University of Nottingham
- Scientific career
- Workplaces: University of Leeds; London School of Hygiene & Tropical Medicine; Newcastle University
- Thesis: Aspects of robustness and approximation in hierarchical models (1998)

Linda Sharples is a British statistician who is Professor of Medical Statistics at the London School of Hygiene & Tropical Medicine. Her research considers statistical analysis of medical interventions. She has provided expert advice to clinical trials on cardiovascular disease, diabetes and cancer.

== Early life and education ==
Sharples was trained at the University of Nottingham, where she focussed on mathematics and statistics. Her doctoral research considered robustness and approximation in hierarchical models. She joined Newcastle University as a postdoctoral fellow in 1986.

== Research and career ==
In 1989, Sharples joined the Medical Research Council Biostatistics Unit in Cambridge. She was made a programme leader in 2000. In this capacity, she developed statistical methods for assessing health technologies. The outcomes of her research were used to update experimental studies and decision models in the Royal Papworth Hospital NHS Foundation Trust. She applied clinical epidemiology to cardiothoracic transplants. She evaluated surgical procedure and developed multi-state models to describe the history of chronic disease.

In 2013, Sharples left the MRC to join the University of Leeds Clinical Trials Unit as a professor of statistics, where she oversaw the Comprehensive Health Research Division, which focussed on trials in musculoskeletal and cardiovascular medicine. She served on the Government of the United Kingdom Commission on Human Medicines. She moved to the London School of Hygiene & Tropical Medicine as a professor of Medical Statistics in 2017. She studies how medical statistics can be used to evaluate different interventions. She is involved with an investigation into the care pathways of bowel cancer patients.

== Selected publications ==
- Samer A M Nashef; François Roques; Linda D. Sharples; Johan Nilsson; Christopher Smith; Antony R Goldstone; Ulf Lockowandt (29 February 2012). "EuroSCORE II". European Journal of Cardio-Thoracic Surgery. 41 (4): 734-44; discussion 744-5. doi:10.1093/ejcts/ezs043. ISSN 1010-7940. PMID 22378855. Wikidata Q39646373.
- Stephen P Hoole; Patrick M Heck; Linda Sharples; et al. (2 February 2009). "Cardiac Remote Ischemic Preconditioning in Coronary Stenting (CRISP Stent) Study: a prospective, randomized control trial". Circulation. 119 (6): 820–827. doi:10.1161/circulationaha.108.809723. ISSN 0009-7322. PMID 19188504. Wikidata Q34935546.
- Craig J Taylor; Eleanor Bolton; Susan Pocock; Linda D Sharples; Roger A Pedersen; J Andrew Bradley (1 December 2005). "Banking on human embryonic stem cells: estimating the number of donor cell lines needed for HLA matching". The Lancet. 366 (9502): 2019–2025. doi:10.1016/s0140-6736(05)67813-0. ISSN 0140-6736. PMID 16338451. Wikidata Q81596564.
