= D. M. G. Wishart =

British statistician

David Matthew G. Wishart was a British statistician.

Wishart was born in Stockton-on-Tees to parents William and Nelly in 1928. His father, an engineer, worked for Imperial Chemical Industries and was later a lecturer in mechanical engineering at the University of Birmingham. His mother was one of the first women to have earned a doctorate in Scotland, completing her graduate studies in physical chemistry. Wishart was educated at Oundle School, and enrolled at the University of St Andrews, originally to study chemistry, before changing his focus to mathematics. Wishart was later awarded a scholarship by the English-Speaking Union. He used the funds to pursue a doctorate at Princeton University, where he met George Kendall. Wishart's doctoral thesis, Augmentation Techniques in the Theory of Queues, was completed in 1960.

Wishart's teaching career began in 1958 at the University of Birmingham. He remained a lecturer there until his retirement in 1988. Wishart served two stints as chair of the School of Mathematics at Birmingham, from 1973 to 1977, and also in 1979. He was the first person to lead the school without attaining the rank of professor. Wishart was editor of the Journal of the Royal Statistical Society, Series B from 1965 to 1969, and awarded the Society's Chambers Medal in 1989. Through his work as a journal editor, Wishart became interested in printing, and subsequently acquired his first printing press in 1966. He devoted more time to printing after leaving the University of Birmingham. His operation grew to seven presses, and became known as Hayloft Press. A collection of Wishart's printing work is held by the University of Manchester.
