= International Society for Bayesian Analysis =

Learned society for Bayesian statistics

International Society for Bayesian Analysis (ISBA)
- Formation: 1992; 34 years ago
- Type: Learned society
- Purpose: Bayesian statistics
- Headquarters: Durham, North Carolina, USA
- President: Antonio Lijoi
- President Elect: Judith Rousseau
- Past President: Michele Guindani
- Website: bayesian.org

The International Society for Bayesian Analysis (ISBA) is a society with the goal of promoting Bayesian analysis for solving problems in the sciences and government. It was formally incorporated as a not for profit corporation by economist Arnold Zellner and statisticians Gordon M. Kaufman and Thomas H. Leonard on 10 November 1992. It publishes the electronic journal Bayesian Analysis and organizes world meetings every other year.

ISBA is an "official partner" of the Joint Statistical Meetings.

== List of presidents ==
The president of ISBA is elected annually. Service typically lasts three years, since the offices of President Elect and Past President are also official positions.

- 1992–1996 Arnold Zellner (founding co-president)
- 1992–1996 Jose Bernardo (founding co-president)
- 1997 Stephen Fienberg
- 1998 Susie Bayarri
- 1999 John Geweke
- 2000 Philip Dawid
- 2001 Alicia Carriquiry
- 2002 David Draper
- 2003 Edward George
- 2004 Jim Berger
- 2005 Sylvia Richardson
- 2006 Alan Gelfand
- 2007 Peter Green
- 2008 Christian Robert
- 2009 Mike West
- 2010 Peter Müller
- 2011 Michael I. Jordan
- 2012 Fabrizio Ruggeri
- 2013 Merlise Clyde
- 2014 Sonia Petrone
- 2015 Alexandra Schmidt
- 2016 Steven MacEachern
- 2017 Kerrie Mengersen
- 2018 Marina Vannucci
- 2019 Raquel Prado
- 2020 Sylvia Frühwirth-Schnatter
- 2021 Igor Prünster
- 2022 Sudipto Banerjee
- 2023 Amy Herring
- 2024 Aad van der Vaart
- 2025 Michele Guindani
- 2026 Antonio Lijoi
- 2027 Judith Rousseau

== Fellows ==
Every two years, ISBA selects Fellows, to recognize "outstanding contributions in some aspect of statistical work (publication, teaching, and service, including service to the society)".
