= Significance (magazine) =

Statistics journal

- Editor: Anna Britten
- Categories: Statistics
- Frequency: Bimonthly
- Circulation: 28,000
- First issue: March 2004
- Company: Oxford University Press on behalf of the Royal Statistical Society and American Statistical Association
- Country: United Kingdom/United States
- Language: English
- Website: significancemagazine.com
- ISSN: 1740-9705

Significance, established in 2004, is a bimonthly print and digital magazine published by Oxford University Press on behalf of the Royal Statistical Society (RSS), the Statistical Society of Australia (SSA) and the American Statistical Association (ASA). It publishes articles on topics of statistical interest presented at a level suited for a general audience. Articles are reviewed by an editorial board of statistics experts drawn from the three societies. The founding editor-in-chief was Helen Joyce. The current editor is Anna Britten. Significance replaced the RSS's journal, The Statistician. The magazine also has a website.

In addition to ordinary articles in the magazine, additional "virtual issues" (collections of articles on a particular subject area) are made available online. In November 2010 the magazine launched its website. Having been launched as a quarterly magazine, Significance changed to a bimonthly frequency in 2011. In 2020, the regular column 'Dr Fisher's Casebook' was renamed 'the secret statistician', a review prompted by concern about Fisher's views on eugenics (and supported by the lack of salience of the homage to Dr. Finlay's Casebook).

Members of either the RSS or the ASA receive the magazine as part of their membership. In January 2015, the RSS and ASA decided to make the magazine issues available to the public free of charge a year after their publication.
