= John Chambers (statistician) =

American statistician (born 1941)

- Born: John McKinley Chambers; April 28, 1941 (age 85); Toronto, Ontario, Canada
- Education: University of Toronto (BSc); Harvard University (MA, PhD)
- Known for: R programming language
- Awards: ACM Software System Award (1998); Fellow of the American Statistical Association; Fellow of the American Association for the Advancement of Science; Fellow of the Institute of Mathematical Statistics
- Scientific career
- Fields: Statistical computing
- Workplaces: Bell Labs (1966–2005); Stanford University (2008–present)
- Website: johnmchambers.su.domains

John McKinley Chambers (born April 28, 1941) is the creator of the S programming language, and core member of the R programming language project. He was awarded the 1998 ACM Software System Award for developing S.

== Early life ==
John McKinley Chambers was born on April 28, 1941, in Toronto, Ontario. He received a Bachelor of Science from the University of Toronto in 1963. He received a Master of Arts in 1965 and a PhD degree in 1966, both in statistics, from Harvard University.

== Career ==
Chambers started at Bell Laboratories in 1966 as a member of its technical staff. From 1981 to 1983, he was the head of its Advanced Software Department and from 1983 to 1989 he was the head of its Statistics and Data Analysis Research Department. In 1989, he moved back to full-time research and in 1995, he became a distinguished member of the technical staff. In 1997, he was made the first Fellow of Bell Labs and was cited for "pioneering contributions to the field of statistical computing". He remained a distinguished member of the technical staff and a Fellow until his retirement from Bell Labs in 2005.

After retiring from Bell Labs, Chambers became a visiting professor at the University of Auckland, University of California, Los Angeles and Stanford University. Since 2008, he has been active at Stanford, currently serving as Senior Advisor of its data science program and an adjunct professor in Stanford's Department of Statistics.

Chambers is a Fellow of the American Statistical Association, the American Association for the Advancement of Science and the Institute of Mathematical Statistics.

== Awards and accomplishments ==
Chambers has received the following awards:

- 1998, awarded the ACM Software System Award for developing the S programming language. The award was presented on May 15, 1999.
- 2004, awarded an honorary Doctor of Mathematics degree from the University of Waterloo

=== John M. Chambers Statistical Software Award ===
Following his 1998 ACM Software System Award, Chambers donated his prize money (US$10,000) to the American Statistical Association to endow an award for novel statistical software, the John M. Chambers Statistical Software Award.

== Bibliography ==
- Chambers, John M. (1977). Computational methods for data analysis. New York: Wiley. ISBN 0-471-02772-3.
- Chambers, John M. (1983). Graphical methods for data analysis. Belmont, Calif: Wadsworth International Group. ISBN 0-534-98052-X.
- Chambers, John M. (1984). Compstat lectures: lectures in computational statistics. Heidelberg: Physica. ISBN 3-7051-0006-8.
- Becker, R.A.; Chambers, J.M. (1984). S: An Interactive Environment for Data Analysis and Graphics. Pacific Grove, CA, USA: Wadsworth & Brooks/Cole. ISBN 0-534-03313-X.
- Becker, R.A.; Chambers, J.M. (1985). Extending the S System. Pacific Grove, CA, USA: Wadsworth & Brooks/Cole. ISBN 0-534-05016-6.
- Becker, R.A.; Chambers, J.M.; Wilks, A.R. (1988). The New S Language: A Programming Environment for Data Analysis and Graphics. Pacific Grove, CA, USA: Wadsworth & Brooks/Cole. ISBN 0-534-09192-X.
- Chambers, J.M.; Hastie, T.J. (1991). Statistical Models in S. Pacific Grove, CA, USA: Wadsworth & Brooks/Cole. p. 624. ISBN 0-412-05291-1.
- Chambers, John M. (1998). Programming with data: a guide to the S language. Berlin: Springer. ISBN 0-387-98503-4.
- Chambers, John M. (2008). Software for data analysis programming with R. Berlin: Springer. ISBN 978-0-387-75935-7.
- Chambers, John M. (2016). Extending R. Florida: Chapman and Hall/CRC. p. 382. ISBN 978-1498775717.
