= Alan E. Gelfand =

American statistician

Alan Enoch Gelfand
- Born: April 17, 1945 (age 81); Bronx, New York
- Education: City College of New York; Stanford University
- Known for: Gibbs sampling
- Scientific career
- Workplaces: University of Connecticut; Duke University
- Thesis: Seriation of Multivariate Observations through Similarities (1969)
- Doctoral advisor: Herbert Solomon
- Doctoral students: Sudipto Banerjee; Bani K. Mallick; Huiyan Sang

Alan Enoch Gelfand (born April 17, 1945) is an American statistician, and the James B. Duke Professor of Statistics and Decision Sciences at Duke University. Gelfand’s research includes substantial contributions to the fields of Bayesian statistics, spatial statistics and hierarchical modeling.

== Education and career ==
Gelfand was born in Bronx, New York. After graduating from the public school system at the young age of 16, Gelfand attended the City College of New York as an undergraduate where he excelled in mathematics. Gelfand’s matriculation to graduate school symbolized both a physical and educational transition as he moved cross-country to attend Stanford University and pursue a Ph.D. in Statistics. He finished his dissertation in 1969 on seriation methods (chronological sequencing) under the direction of Herbert Solomon.

Gelfand accepted an offer from the University of Connecticut where he spent 33 years as a professor. In 2002, he moved to Duke University as the James B. Duke Professor of Statistics and Decision Sciences. In 2015, his department threw a birthday conference April 19–22 in Durham, North Carolina that included eminent speakers such as Adrian F. M. Smith.

== Research ==
=== Gelfand and Smith (1990) ===
After attending a short course taught by Adrian Smith at Bowling Green State University, Gelfand decided to take a sabbatical to Nottingham, UK with the intention of working on using numerical methods to solve empirical Bayes problems. After studying Tanner and Wong (1987) and being hinted as to its connection to Geman and Geman (1984) by David Clayton, Gelfand was able to realize the computational value of replacing expensive numerical techniques with Monte Carlo sampling-based methods in Bayesian inference. Published as Gelfand and Smith (1990), Gelfand described how the Gibbs sampler can be used for Bayesian inference in a computationally efficient manner. Since its publication, the general methods described in Gelfand and Smith (1990) has revolutionized data analysis allowing previously intractable problems to now be tractable. To date, the paper has been cited over 7500 times.

=== Contributions to spatial statistics ===
In 1994, Gelfand was presented with a dataset that he had previously not encountered: scallop catches on the Atlantic Ocean. Intrigued by the challenges associated with analyzing data with structured spatial correlation, Gelfand, along with colleagues Sudipto Banerjee and Bradley P. Carlin, created an inferential paradigm for analyzing spatial data. Gelfand’s contributions to spatial statistics include spatially-varying coefficient models, linear models of coregionalization for multivariate spatial processes, predictive processes for analysis of large spatial data and non-parametric approaches to the analysis of spatial data. Gelfand's research in spatial statistics spans application areas of ecology, disease and the environment.

== Awards and recognition ==
- Elected Fellow of the American Statistical Association, May 1978
- Elected Member of the International Statistical Institute, 1986
- Elected Member of the Connecticut Academy of Arts and Sciences, April 1995
- Elected Fellow of the Institute of Mathematical Statistics, August 1996
- Mosteller Statistician of the Year Award, February 2001
- Tenth Most Cited Mathematical Scientist in the World 1991–2001
- Science Watch President, International Society for Bayesian Analysis, 2006
- Recipient, Parzen Prize, 2006
- Distinguished Research Medal, ASA Section on Statistics and the Environment, 2013
- Elected Fellow, International Society for Bayesian Analysis, November 2015
- Samuel S. Wilks Memorial Award, American Statistical Association, 2019
- Research.com Mathematics in United States Leader Award, 2023

== Bibliography ==
=== Books ===
- Gelfand, Alan E.; Walker, Crayton C. (1984). Ensemble Modeling: Inference from Small Scale Properties to Large Scale Systems. CRC Press. ISBN 9780824771805.
- Clark, James S.; Gelfand, Alan E., eds. (2006). Hierarchical Modelling for the Environmental Sciences: Statistical Methods and Applications. Oxford University Press. ISBN 0-198-56967-X.
- Gelfand, A. E., Diggle, P., Guttorp, P., & Fuentes, M. (Eds.). (2010). Handbook of spatial statistics. CRC press.
- Banerjee, S., Carlin, B. P., & Gelfand, A. E. (2014). Hierarchical modeling and analysis for spatial data. CRC Press.
- Gelfand, Alan E., ed. (2014). Contributions to the Theory and Application of Statistics: A Volume in Honor of Herbert Solomon. Academic Press. ISBN 978-1-483-23931-6.

=== Selected papers ===
- Gelfand, A. E.; Hills, S. E.; Racine-Poon, A.; Smith, A. F. (1990). "Illustration of Bayesian inference in normal data models using Gibbs sampling". Journal of the American Statistical Association. 85 (412): 972–985. doi:10.1080/01621459.1990.10474968.
- Gelfand, A. E.; Smith, A. F. (1990). "Sampling-based approaches to calculating marginal densities". Journal of the American Statistical Association. 85 (410): 398–409. doi:10.1080/01621459.1990.10476213.
- Gelfand, A. E.; Dey, D. K. (1994). "Bayesian Model Choice: Asymptotics and Exact Calculations". Journal of the Royal Statistical Society. Series B (Methodological). 56 (3): 501–514. doi:10.1111/j.2517-6161.1994.tb01996.x. ISSN 0035-9246. JSTOR 2346123.
- Waller, L. A.; Carlin, B. P.; Xia, H.; Gelfand, A. E. (1997). "Hierarchical spatio-temporal mapping of disease rates". Journal of the American Statistical Association. 92 (438): 607–617. doi:10.1080/01621459.1997.10474012.
- Gelfand, A. E.; Kim, H. J.; Sirmans, C. F.; Banerjee, S. (2003). "Spatial modeling with spatially varying coefficient processes". Journal of the American Statistical Association. 98 (462): 387–396. doi:10.1198/016214503000170. PMC 11484471. S2CID 122987154.
- Gelfand, A. E.; Schmidt, A. M.; Banerjee, S.; Sirmans, C. F. (2004). "Nonstationary multivariate process modeling through spatially varying coregionalization". Test. 13 (2): 263–312. doi:10.1007/bf02595775. S2CID 56244076.
- Gelfand, A. E.; Kottas, A.; MacEachern, S. N. (2005). "Bayesian nonparametric spatial modeling with Dirichlet process mixing". Journal of the American Statistical Association. 100 (471): 1021–1035. doi:10.1198/016214504000002078. S2CID 35557355.
- Banerjee, S.; Gelfand, A. E.; Finley, A. O.; Sang, H. (2008). "Gaussian predictive process models for large spatial data sets". Journal of the Royal Statistical Society. Series B (Statistical Methodology). 70 (4): 825–848. doi:10.1111/j.1467-9868.2008.00663.x. PMC 2741335. PMID 19750209.
- Berrocal, V.J.; Gelfand, A.E; Holland, D.M. (2010). "A Spatio-temporal Downscaler for Output from Numerical Models". Journal of Agricultural, Biological and Environmental Statistics. 14 (2): 176–197. doi:10.1007/s13253-009-0004-z. PMC 2990198. PMID 21113385.
- Gelfand, A.E. (2012). "Hierarchical Modeling for Spatial Data Problems". Spatial Statistics. 1: 30–39. Bibcode:2012SpaSt...1...30G. doi:10.1016/j.spasta.2012.02.005. PMC 3760588. PMID 24010050.
