= International Statistical Institute =

Professional association of statisticians

- Formation: 1885
- Type: Statistical society
- Headquarters: The Hague, Netherlands
- President: Fabrizio Ruggeri
- Website: www.isi-web.org

The International Statistical Institute (ISI) is a professional association of statisticians. At a meeting of the Jubilee Meeting of the Royal Statistical Society, statisticians met and formed the agreed statues of the International Statistical Institute. It was founded in 1885, although there had been international statistical congresses since 1853. The institute has about 4,000 members from government, academia, and the private sector. The affiliated associations have membership open to any professional statistician.

The institute publishes a variety of books and journals, and holds an international conference every two years. The biennial convention was commonly known as the ISI Session; however, since 2011, it is now referred to as the ISI World Statistics Congress. The permanent office of the institute is located in the Statistics Netherlands (CBS) building in the Leidschenveen-Ypenburg district of The Hague, in the Netherlands. It was established in 1913 to preserve documents and findings as well as publishing an international statistical yearbook periodically. The ISI does not disclose its membership fees until an applicant has created an account.

The ISI is built upon statutes that aim at establishing strong statistical relationships between countries through research, publications, and teachings by professional statisticians. The ISI contains seven associations that each have their own form of government, specified journals, and tasks. Each association works individually, but also closely together to further obtain the ISI's goals.

The institute has also collaborated with the United Nations Statistical Commission over the years on numerous topics, as they have shared interests in the statistical community. These collaborations and overlaps have occurred most commonly over statistical ethics to be used worldwide, as well as having members be a part of both organizations at some point in time.

== Specialized associations ==
ISI serves as an umbrella for seven specialized Associations:

- Bernoulli Society for Mathematical Statistics and Probability (BS)
- International Association for Statistical Computing (IASC)
- International Association for Official Statistics (IAOS)
- International Association of Survey Statisticians (IASS)
- International Association for Statistical Education (IASE)
- International Society for Business and Industrial Statistics (ISBIS)
- The International Environmetrics Society (TIES)

== Committees ==
ISI Committees fall under one of three categories: operational, special interest, and outreach.

Current Special Interest Groups are:

- Agricultural sciences
- Astrostatistics
- History of statistics
- Professional ethics
- Promotion of statistics in the life sciences
- Risk analysis
- Sports statistics
- Statistics of travel and tourism
- Women in statistics

== Journals ==
ISI publishes the following journals:

- Bulletin of the International Statistical Institute
- International Statistical Review
- Statistical Theory and Method Abstracts
- Bernoulli
- Computational Statistics & Data Analysis
- Statistics Education Research Journal
- Statistics Surveys

== Karl Pearson Prize ==
The Karl Pearson Prize was commenced by the ISI in 2013 to acknowledge contributions, which must be a research article or book published within the last three decades, on statistical theory, methodology, practice, or applications. The prize was named after English statistician Karl Pearson. It is bestowed biennially at the ISI World Statistics Congress. The winner of the prize receives 5,000 euros and gives the Karl Pearson Lecture.

Peter McCullagh and John Nelder were the winners of the inaugural Karl Pearson Prize "for their monograph Generalized Linear Models (1983)".

== Presidents of ISI ==
The organization has had thirty-eight presidents. The current president is Xuming He.

- 1885 – 1899: Sir Rawson W. Rawson ( (England) )
- 1899 – 1908: Karl von Inama-Sternegg ( (Austria-Hungary) )
- 1909 – 1920: Luigi Bodio ( (Kingdom of Italy) )
- 1923 – 1931: Albert Delatour ( (France) )
- 1931 – 1936: Friedrich Zahn ( (Weimar Republic) // (Nazi Germany) )
- 1936 – 1947: Armand Julin ( (Belgium) )
- 1947 – 1947: Walter Francis Willcox ( (United States) )
- 1947 – 1953: Stuart A. Rice ( (United States) )
- 1953 – 1960: Georges Darmois ( (France) )
- 1960 – 1963: Marcello Boldrini ( (Italy) )
- 1963 – 1967: Sir Harry Campion ( (England) )
- 1967 – 1971: William Gemmell Cochran ( (United States) )
- 1971 – 1975: Petter Jakob Bjerve ( (Norway) )
- 1975 – 1977: Milos Macura ( (Socialist Federal Republic of Yugoslavia) )
- 1977 – 1979: Calyampudi Radhakrishna Rao ( (India) )
- 1979 – 1981: Edmond Malinvaud ( (France) )
- 1981 – 1983: Enrique Cansado ( (Chile) )
- 1983 – 1985: James Durbin ( (England) )
- 1985 – 1987: Sigeiti Moriguti ( (Japan) )
- 1987 – 1989: Ivan P. Fellegi ( (Canada) )
- 1989 – 1991: Gunnar Kulldorff ( (Sweden) )
- 1991 – 1993: Frederick Mosteller ( (United States) )
- 1993 – 1995: Jayanta Kumar Ghosh ( (India) )
- 1995 – 1997: Sir David R. Cox ( (England) )
- 1997 – 1999: Willem R. van Zwet ( (Netherlands) )
- 1999 – 2001: Jean-Louis Bodin ( (France) )
- 2001 – 2003: Dennis Trewin ( (Australia) )
- 2003 – 2005: Stephen M. Stigler ( (United States) )
- 2005 – 2007: Niels Keiding ( (Denmark) )
- 2007 – 2009: Denise A. Lievesley ( (England) )
- 2009 – 2011: Jozef L. Teugels ( (Belgium) )
- 2011 – 2013: Jae Chang Lee ( (Korea) )
- 2013 – 2015: Vijayan Nair ( (United States) )
- 2015 – 2017: Pedro Luis do Nascimento Silva ( (Brazil) )
- 2017 – 2019: Helen MacGillivray ( (Australia) )
- 2019 – 2021: A. John Bailer ( (United States) )
- 2021 – 2023: Steve Penneck ( (United Kingdom) )
- 2023 – 2025: Xuming He ( (United States) )
- 2025 – 2027: Fabrizio Ruggeri ( (Italy) )

== Notable members ==
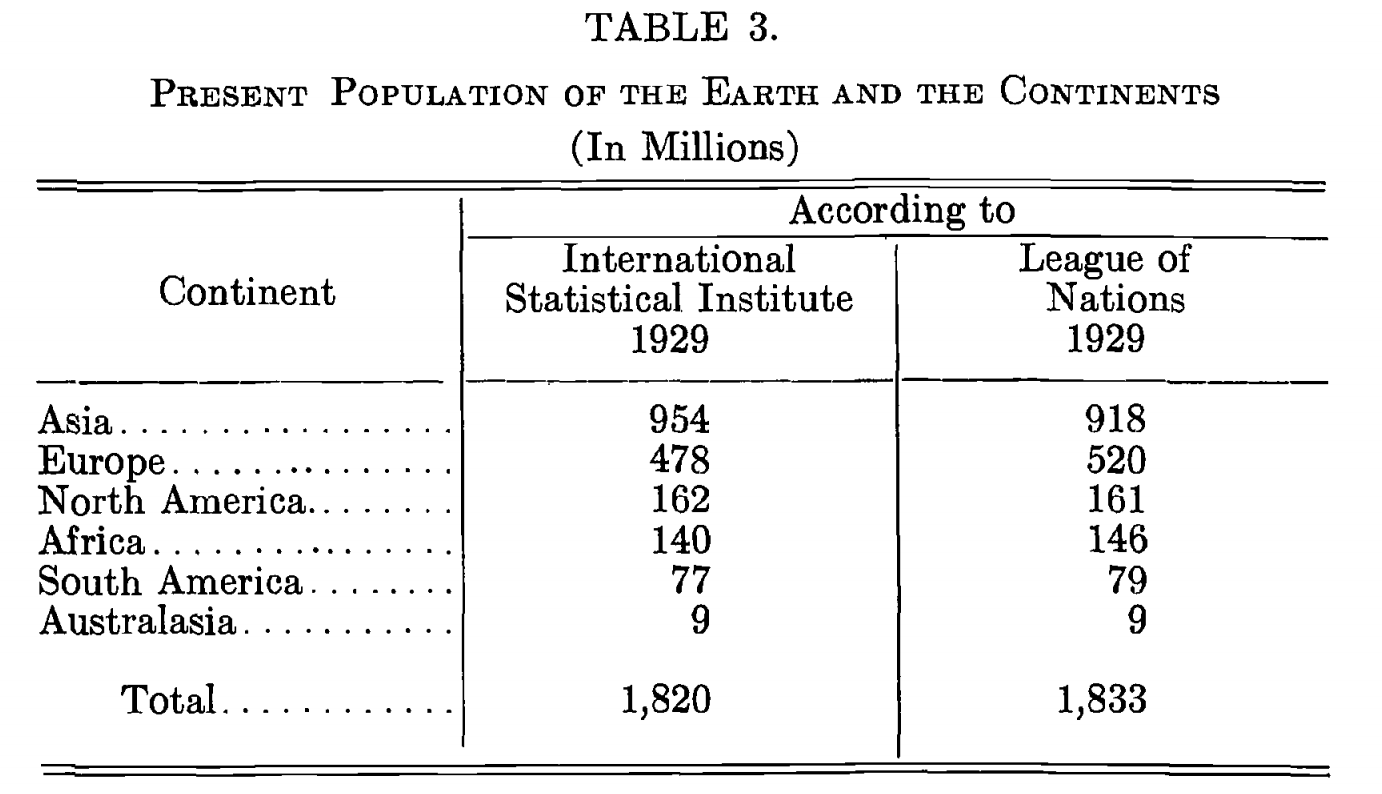
1929 World population estimate comparison of ISI and League of Nations

- Horatio C. Burchard
- R. G. D. Allen

== See also ==
- Royal Statistical Society of Belgium
- Pablo Ferrari
- United Nations Statistical Commission
- World Health Organization
- Beatrix of the Netherlands
