= Royal Statistical Society =

British learned society

- Abbreviation: RSS
- Formation: 15 March 1834
- Type: Professional body, learned society, charity
- Legal status: Non-profit company
- Purpose: A world where data are at the heart of understanding and decision making
- Headquarters: London, EC2; United Kingdom
- Region served: Worldwide
- Members: British and worldwide statisticians and data professionals
- Official language: English
- Chief Executive: Sarah Cumbers
- Main organ: RSS Council (President: John Aston)
- Affiliations: American Statistical Association
- Website: rss.org.uk

The Royal Statistical Society (RSS) is an established statistical society. It has three main roles: a British learned society for statistics, a professional body for statisticians and a charity which promotes statistics for the public good.

== History ==
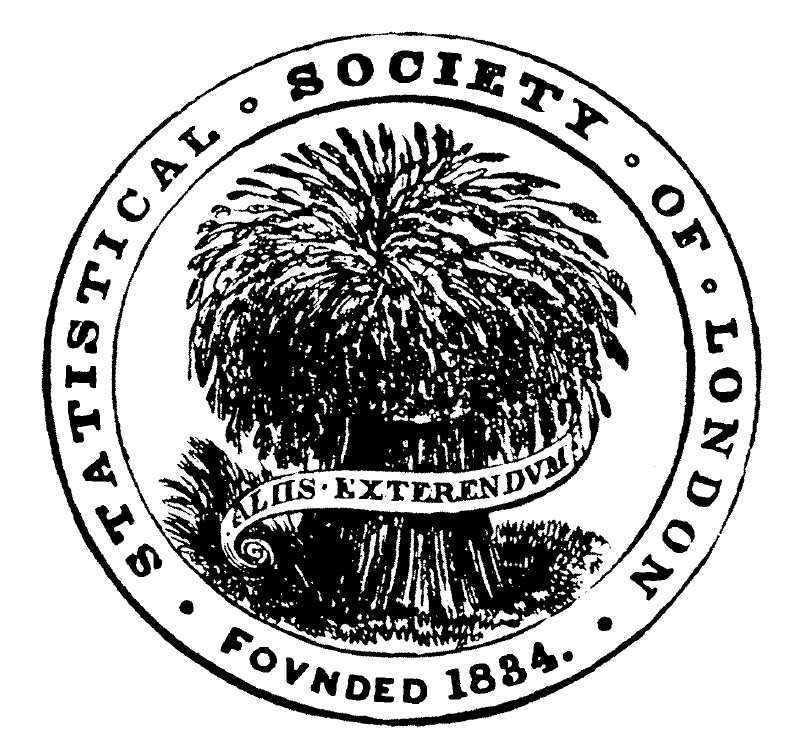
The early seal of the Statistical Society of London, a wheatsheaf with the motto Aliis exterendum

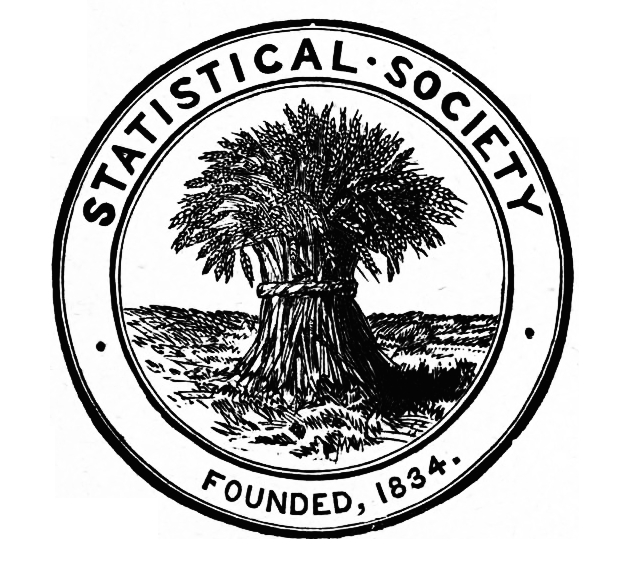
Later seal

The society was founded in 1834 as the Statistical Society of London, though a perhaps unrelated London Statistical Society was in existence at least as early as 1824. At that time there were many provincial statistics societies throughout Britain, but most have not survived. The Manchester Statistical Society (which is older than the LSS) is a notable exception. The associations were formed with the object of gathering information about society. The idea of statistics referred more to political knowledge rather than a series of methods. The members called themselves "statists" and the original aim was "...procuring, arranging and publishing facts to illustrate the condition and prospects of society" and the idea of interpreting data, or having opinions, was explicitly excluded. The original seal had the motto Aliis Exterendum (for others to thresh out, i.e. interpret) but this separation was found to be a hindrance and the motto was dropped in later logos.

During its founding time, political economy as understood back then was concerned with the principles (causal models) of economy formulated in words, while statistics was concerned with collecting and tabulating quantitative data of economy, without additional interpretation. During 1830s, it concentrated on the condition of England question. By the 1840s it changed focus to the sanitary movement. It was many decades before mathematics was regarded as part of the statistical project.

=== Key figures ===
Instrumental in founding the Statistical Society of London were Richard Jones, Charles Babbage, Adolphe Quetelet, William Whewell, Thomas Malthus, and William Henry Sykes. Among its famous members was Florence Nightingale, who was the society's first female member in 1858. Stella Cunliffe was the first female president. Other notable RSS presidents have included William Beveridge, Ronald Fisher, Harold Wilson, and David Cox.

Honorary Secretaries include Gerald Goodhardt (1982–88).

=== Royal Charter ===
The LSS became the RSS (Royal Statistical Society) by Royal Charter in 1887, and merged with the Institute of Statisticians in 1993. The merger enabled the society to take on the role of a professional body as well as that of a learned society. As of 2025, the society claims more than 11,000 members around the world, of whom some 900 are professionally qualified, with the status of Chartered Statistician (CStat). In January 2009, the RSS received Licensed Body status from the UK Science Council to award Chartered Scientist status. Since February 2009 the society has awarded Chartered Scientist status to suitably qualified members.

Unusually among professional societies, all members of the RSS are known as "Fellows". Fellowship is nowadays not usually used by post-merger members as a post-nominal mark of distinction. However, before the 1993 merger with the Institute of Statisticians, Fellows often used the post-nominal letters FSS. Before the merger, Fellows were required to have a statistical qualification. The alternative route was to be proposed by two Fellows. The nomination paper then had to be approved by the Council. After the merger these requirements were dropped and all the previous members of the Institute of Statisticians became Fellows as well. Since then, use by new members of their unearned post-nominal FSS qualification was viewed as inappropriate and strongly discouraged, and it became less common.

== Structure ==
The RSS is currently based in Shoreditch, having previously been based in Errol Street, EC1, in the London Borough of Islington close to the boundary with the City of London, between Old Street and Barbican stations.

The society has various local groups in the UK, together with a wide range of topic-related sections and special interest groups. Each of these sections and groups organises lectures and seminars on statistical topics.

== Functions ==
The society was particularly engaged with the passage of the Statistics and Registration Service Act 2007, having long argued for legislation on statistics.

=== Events ===
The RSS organises an annual conference. Among the society's awards are the Guy Medals in gold, silver and bronze, in honour of William Guy.

The RSS team reached the finals of University Challenge: The Professionals 2006, where they were beaten 230 to 125 by a team from the Bodleian Library, Oxford.

=== Publications ===
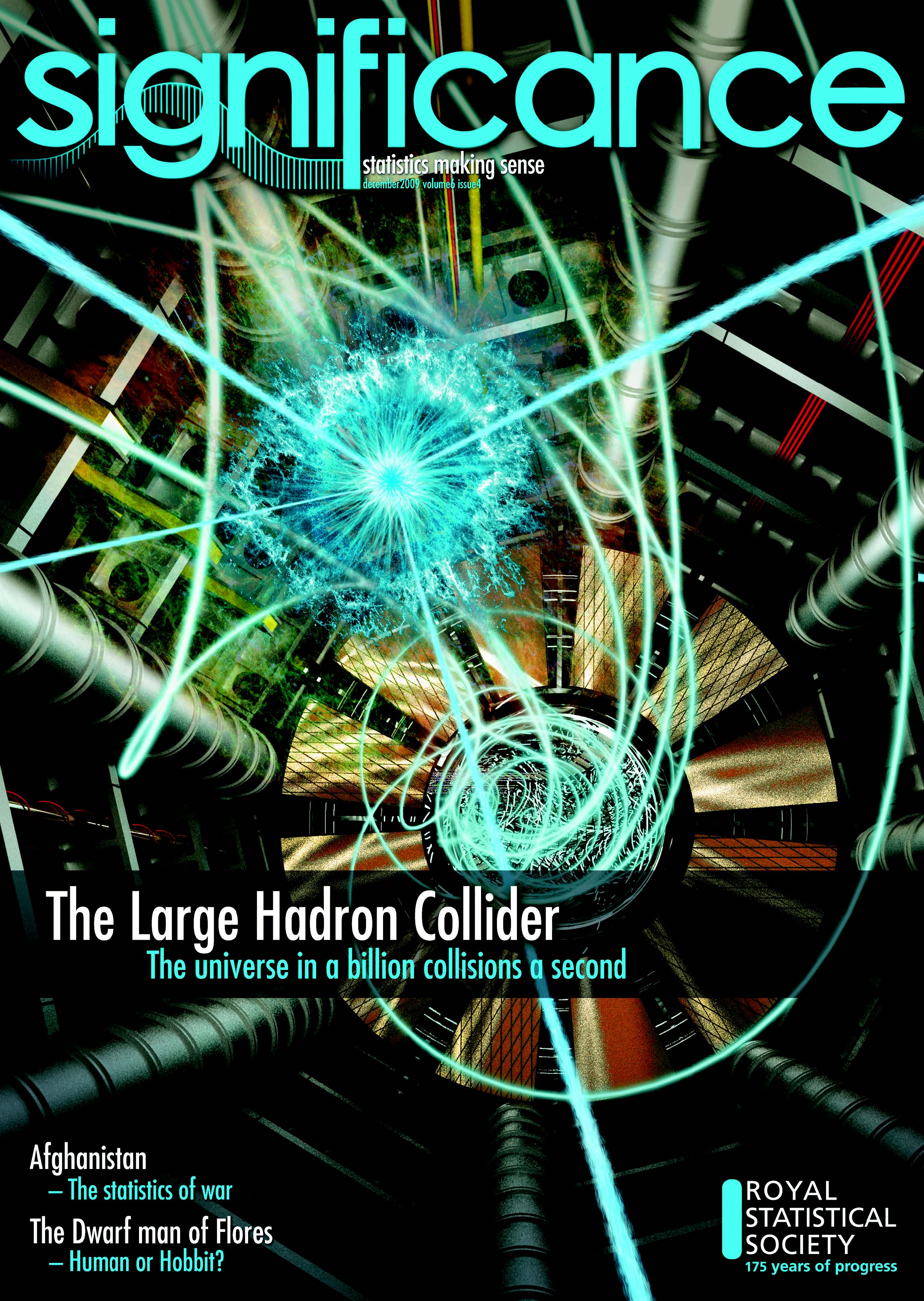
Significance magazine

The society publishes the Journal of the Royal Statistical Society, which currently consists of three separate series of journals whose contents include papers presented at ordinary meetings of the society, namely Series A (Statistics in Society), Series B (Statistical Methodology) and Series C (Applied Statistics), as well as a general audience magazine called Significance published in conjunction with the American Statistical Association. In September 2013, the society established StatsLife, an online magazine website that featured news, interviews and opinion from the world of statistics and data, though this appears to have been discontinued. In September 2024, the Data Science and Artificial Intelligence journal was launched by the society.

== Fellows ==
The RSS has two classes of fellow. One is open to anyone with an interest in statistics. It is not restricted to only those with high achievement within the discipline. The second is honorary fellow, that is awarded to people of "great eminence working in fields related to statistics who are not necessarily or primarily members of the statistical profession."

== See also ==
- Council for the Mathematical Sciences
- Royal Statistical Society of Belgium
