= Monographs on Statistics and Applied Probability =

Statistics book series started in 1960

The Monographs on Statistics and Applied Probability (MSAP) is a mathematics and statistics book series initiated by British statistician David Cox in 1960. It features works from some of the best statisticians and mathematicians since its inception. The topics covered in this series include mathematical statistics, applied statistics, computational statistics, biostatistics and statistical genetics, applied probability, and actuarial science. Other adjacent domains using statistical and probability models such as econometrics, mathematical ecology and network science are also covered by a subset of volumes in this series.

The MSAP series published its first volume in 1960, authored by Maurice S. Bartlett. Its one-hundredth volume was published in 2004.

== Books in the series ==
Volume number	Book title	Author(s) / Editor(s)	Year	ISBN	Ref
1	Stochastic Population Models in Ecology and Epidemiology	Maurice S. Bartlett	1960	ISBN 0-416-52330-7	
2	Queues	David R. Cox & Walter L. Smith	1961	ISBN 0-412-10930-1	
3	Monte Carlo Methods	John M. Hammersley & David C. Handscomb	1964	ISBN 0-416-52340-4	
4	The Statistical Analysis of Series of Events	David R. Cox & Peter A.W. Lewis	1966	ISBN 0-416-52400-1	
5	Population Genetics	Warren J. Ewens	1969	ISBN 0-416-03160-9	
6	Probability, Statistics and Time	Maurice S. Bartlett	1975	ISBN 0-412-14150-7	
7	Statistical Inference	Samuel D. Silvey	1975	ISBN 0-412-13820-4	
8	The Analysis of Contingency Tables	Brian S. Everitt	1977	ISBN 0-412-14970-2	
9	Multivariate Analysis in Behavioural Research	Albert Ernest Maxwell	1977	ISBN 0-412-14300-3	
10	Stochastic Abundance Models	Steinar Engen	1978	ISBN 0-412-15240-1	
11	Some Basic Theory for Statistical Inference	E. J. G. Pitman	1978	ISBN 0-412-21720-1	
12	Point Processes	David R. Cox & Valerie Isham	1980	ISBN 0-412-21910-7	
13	Identification of Outliers	Douglas M. Hawkins	1980	ISBN 0-412-21900-X	
14	Optimal Design	Samuel D. Silvey	1980	ISBN 0-412-22910-2	
15	Finite Mixture Distributions	Brian S. Everitt & David J. Hand	1981	ISBN 0-412-22420-8	
16	Classification	Allan D. Gordon	1981	ISBN 0-412-22850-5	
17	Distribution-free Statistical Methods	Johannes Stephanus Maritz	1981	ISBN 0-412-15940-6	
18	Residuals and Influence in Regression	R. Dennis Cook & Sanford Weisberg	1982	ISBN 0-412-24280-X	
19	Applications of Queueing Theory	Gordon F. Newell	1982	ISBN 0-412-24500-0	
20	Risk Theory (3rd edition)	Robert Eric Beard, Teivo Pentikäinen & Erkki Pesonen	1984	ISBN 0-412-24260-5	
21	Analysis of Survival Data	David R. Cox & David Oakes	1984	ISBN 0-412-24490-X	
22	An Introduction to Latent Variable Models	Brian S. Everitt	1984	ISBN 0-412-25310-0	
23	Bandit Problems	Donald A. Berry & Bert Fristedt	1985	ISBN 0-412-24810-7	
24	Stochastic Modelling and Control	Mark H. A. Davis & Richard B. Vinter	1985	ISBN 0-412-16200-8	
25	The Statistical Analysis of Compositional Data	John Aitchison	1986	ISBN 0-412-28060-4	
26	Density Estimation for Statistical and Data Analysis	Bernard W. Silverman	1986	ISBN 0-412-24620-1	
27	Regression Analysis with Application	G. Barrie Wetherill	1986	ISBN 0-412-27490-6	
28	Sequential Methods in Statistics (3rd edition)	G. Barrie Wetherill	1986	ISBN 0-412-28150-3	
29	Tensor Methods in Statistics	Peter McCullagh	1987	ISBN 0-412-27480-9	
30	Transformation and Weighting in Regression	Raymond J. Carroll & David Ruppert	1988	ISBN 0-412-01421-1	
31	Asymptotic Techniques for Use in Statistics	Ole E. Barndorff-Nielsen & David R. Cox	1989	ISBN 0-412-31400-2	
32	Analysis of Binary Data (2nd edition)	David R. Cox & E. Joyce Snell	1989	ISBN 0-412-30620-4	
33	Analysis of Infectious Disease Data	Niels G. Becker	1989	ISBN 0-412-30990-4	
34	Design and Analysis of Cross-Over Trials	Byron Jones & Michael G. Kenward	1989	ISBN 0-412-30000-1	
35	Empirical Bayes Methods (2nd edition)	Johannes Stephanus Maritz & Thaung Lwin	1989	ISBN 0-412-27760-3	
36	Symmetric Multivariate and Related Distributions	Kai-Tai Fang, Samuel Kotz & Kai-Wang Ng	1990	ISBN 0-412-31430-4	
37	Generalized Linear Models (2nd edition)	Peter McCullagh & John A. Nelder	1989	ISBN 0-412-31760-5	
38	Cyclic and Computer Generated Designs (2nd edition)	J.A. John & Emlyn R. Williams	1995	ISBN 0-412-57580-9	
39	Analog Estimation Methods in Econometrics	Charles F. Manski	1988	ISBN 0-412-01141-7	
40	Subset Selection in Regression	Alan J. Miller	1990	ISBN 0-412-35380-6	
41	Analysis of Repeated Measures	Martin J. Crowder & David J. Hand	1990	ISBN 0-412-31830-X	
42	Statistical Reasoning with Imprecise Probabilities	Peter Walley	1991	ISBN 0-412-28660-2	
43	Generalized Additive Models	Trevor J. Hastie & Robert J. Tibshirani	1990	ISBN 0-412-34390-8	
44	Inspection Errors for Attributes in Quality Control	Norman L. Johnson, Samuel Kotz & Xi-Zhi Wu	1991	ISBN 0-412-38770-0	
45	The Analysis of Contingency Tables (2nd edition)	Brian S. Everitt	1992	ISBN 0-412-39850-8	
46	The Analysis of Quantal Response Data	Byron J. T. Morgan	1992	ISBN 0-412-31750-8	
47	Longitudinal Data with Serial Correlation—A state-space approach	Richard H. Jones	1993	ISBN 0-412-40650-0	
48	Differential Geometry and Statistics	Michael K. Murray & John W. Rice	1993	ISBN 0-412-39860-5	
49	Markov Models and Optimization	Mark H. A. Davis	1993	ISBN 0-412-31410-X	
50	Networks and Chaos—Statistical and probabilistic aspects	Ole E. Barndorff-Nielsen, Jens Ledet Jensen & Wilfrid S. Kendall	1993	ISBN 0-412-46530-2	
51	Number-Theoretic Methods in Statistics	Kai-Tai Fang & Yuan Wang	1994	ISBN 0-412-46520-5	
52	Inference and Asymptotics	Ole E. Barndorff-Nielsen & David R. Cox	1994	ISBN 0-412-49440-X	
53	Practical Risk Theory for Actuaries	Christopher D. Daykin, Teivo Pentikäinen & Martti Pesonen	1994	ISBN 0-412-42850-4	
54	Biplots	John C. Gower & David J. Hand	1996	ISBN 0-412-71630-5	
55	Predictive Inference—An introduction	Seymour Geisser	1993	ISBN 0-412-03471-9	
56	Model-Free Curve Estimation	Michael E. Tarter & Michael D. Lock	1993	ISBN 0-412-04251-7	
57	An Introduction to the Bootstrap	Bradley Efron & Robert J. Tibshirani	1993	ISBN 0-412-04231-2	
58	Nonparametric Regression and Generalized Linear Models	Peter J. Green & Bernard W. Silverman	1994	ISBN 0-412-30040-0	
59	Multidimensional Scaling	Trevor F. Cox & Michael A. A. Cox	1994	ISBN 0-412-49120-6	
60	Kernel Smoothing	Matt P. Wand & M. Chris Jones	1995	ISBN 0-412-55270-1	
61	Statistics for Long Memory Processes	Jan Beran	1995	ISBN 0-412-04901-5	
62	Nonlinear Models for Repeated Measurement Data	Marie Davidian & David M. Giltinan	1995	ISBN 0-412-98341-9	
63	Measurement Error in Nonlinear Models	Raymond J. Carroll, David Ruppert & Leonard A. Stefanski	1995	ISBN 0-412-04721-7	
64	Analyzing and Modeling Rank Data	John I. Marden	1995	ISBN 0-412-99521-2	
65	Time Series Models—In econometrics, finance and other fields	David R. Cox, David V. Hinkley & Ole E. Barndorff-Nielsen	1996	ISBN 0-412-72930-X	
66	Local Polynomial Modeling and its Applications	Jianqing Fan & Irène Gijbels	1996	ISBN 0-412-98321-4	
67	Multivariate Dependencies—Models, analysis and interpretation	David R. Cox & Nanny Wermuth	1996	ISBN 0-412-75410-X	
68	Statistical Inference—Based on the likelihood	Adelchi Azzalini	1996	ISBN 0-412-60650-X	
69	Bayes and Empirical Bayes Methods for Data Analysis	Bradley P. Carlin & Thomas A. Louis	1996	ISBN 0-412-05611-9	
70	Hidden Markov and Other Models for Discrete-Valued Time Series	Ian L. Macdonald & Walter Zucchini	1997	ISBN 0-412-55850-5	
71	Statistical Evidence—A likelihood paradigm	Richard Royall	1997	ISBN 0-412-04411-0	
72	Analysis of Incomplete Multivariate Data	Joseph L. Schafer	1997	ISBN 0-412-04061-1	
73	Multivariate Models and Dependence Concepts	Harry Joe	1997	ISBN 0-412-07331-5	
74	Theory of Sample Surveys	Mary E. Thompson	1997	ISBN 0-412-31780-X	
75	Retrial Queues	Gennady Falin & James G. C. Templeton	1997	ISBN 0-412-78550-1	
76	Theory of Dispersion Models	Bent Jørgensen	1997	ISBN 0-412-99711-8	
77	Mixed Poisson Processes	Jan Grandell	1997	ISBN 0-412-78700-8	
78	Variance Components Estimation—Mixed models, methodologies and applications	Poduri S. R. S. Rao	1997	ISBN 0-412-72860-5	
79	Bayesian Methods for Finite Population Sampling	Glen Meeden & Malay Ghosh	1997	ISBN 0-412-98771-6	
80	Stochastic Geometry—Likelihood and computation	Ole E. Barndorff-Nielsen, Wilfrid S. Kendall & Maria N. M. van Lieshout	1998	ISBN 0-8493-0396-6	
81	Computer-Assisted Analysis of Mixtures and Applications—Meta-analysis, disease mapping and others	Dankmar Böhning	1999	ISBN 0-8493-0385-0	
82	Classification (2nd edition)	Allan D. Gordon	1999	ISBN 1-58488-013-9	
83	Semimartingales and their Statistical Inference	B. L. S. Prakasa Rao	1999	ISBN 1-58488-008-2	
84	Statistical Aspects of BSE and vCJD—Models for Epidemics	Christi A. Donnelly & Neil M. Ferguson	1999	ISBN 0-8493-0386-9	
85	Set-Indexed Martingales	Gail Ivanoff & Ely Merzbach	2000	ISBN 1-58488-082-1	
86	The Theory of the Design of Experiments	David R. Cox & Nancy Reid	2000	ISBN 1-58488-195-X	
87	Complex Stochastic Systems	Ole E. Barndorff-Nielsen, David R. Cox & Claudia Klüppelberg	2001	ISBN 1-58488-158-5	
88	Multidimensional Scaling (2nd edition)	Trevor F. Cox & Michael A. A. Cox	2001	ISBN 1-58488-094-5	
89	Algebraic Statistics—Computational Commutative Algebra in Statistics	Giovanni Pistone, Eva Riccomagno & Henry P. Wynn	2001	ISBN 1-58488-204-2	
90	Analysis of Time Series Structure—SSA and Related Techniques	Nina Golyandina, Vladimir Nekrutkin & Anatoly A. Zhigljavsky	2001	ISBN 1-58488-194-1	
91	Subjective Probability Models for Lifetimes	Fabio Spizzichino	2001	ISBN 1-58488-060-0	
92	Empirical Likelihood	Art B. Owen	2001	ISBN 1-58488-071-6	
93	Statistics in the 21st Century	Adrian E. Raftery, Martin A. Tanner & Martin T. Wells	2001	ISBN 1-58488-272-7	
94	Accelerated Life Models: Modeling and Statistical Analysis	Vilijandas Bagdonavicius & Mikhail Nikulin	2001	ISBN 1-58488-186-0	
95	Subset Selection in Regression (2nd edition)	Alan J. Miller	2002	ISBN 1-58488-171-2	
96	Topics in Modelling of Clustered Data	Marc Aerts, Helena Geys, Geert Molenberghs & Louise M. Ryan	2002	ISBN 1-58488-185-2	
97	Components of Variance	David R. Cox & Patricia J. Solomon	2002	ISBN 1-58488-354-5	
98	Design and Analysis of Cross-Over Trials (2nd edition)	Byron Jones & Michael G. Kenward	2003	ISBN 0-412-60640-2	
99	Extreme Values in Finance, Telecommunications, and the Environment	Bärbel Finkenstädt & Holger Rootzén	2003	ISBN 1-58488-411-8	
100	Statistical Inference and Simulation for Spatial Point Processes	Jesper Møller & Rasmus P. Waagepetersen	2004	ISBN 1-58488-265-4	
101	Hierarchical Modeling and Analysis for Spatial Data	Sudipto Banerjee, Bradley P. Carlin & Alan E. Gelfand	2004	ISBN 1-58488-410-X	
102	Diagnostic Checks in Time Series	Wai Keung Li	2004	ISBN 1-58488-337-5	
103	Stereology for Statisticians	Adrian Baddeley & Eva B. Vedel Jensen	2004	ISBN 1-58488-405-3	
104	Gaussian Markov Random Fields: Theory and Applications	Håvard Rue & Leonhard Held	2005	ISBN 1-58488-432-0	
105	Measurement Error in Nonlinear Models: A Modern Perspective (2nd edition)	Raymond J. Carroll, David Ruppert, Leonard A. Stefanski & Ciprian M. Crainiceanu	2006	ISBN 1-58488-633-1	
106	Generalized Linear Models with Random Effects: Unified Analysis via H-likelihood	Youngjo Lee, John A. Nelder & Yudi Pawitan	2006	ISBN 1-58488-631-5	
107	Statistical Methods for Spatio-Temporal Systems	Bärbel Finkenstädt, Leonhard Held & Valerie Isham	2007	ISBN 1-58488-593-9	
108	Nonlinear Time Series: Semiparametric and Nonparametric Methods	Jiti Gao	2007	ISBN 1-58488-613-7	
109	Missing Data in Longitudinal Studies: Strategies for Bayesian Modeling and Sensitivity Analysis	Michael J. Daniels & Joseph W. Hogan	2008	ISBN 1-58488-609-9	
110	Hidden Markov Models for Time Series: An Introduction Using R	Walter Zucchini & Iain L. MacDonald	2009	ISBN 1-58488-573-4	
111	ROC Curves for Continuous Data	Wojtek J. Krzanowski & David J. Hand	2009	ISBN 1-4398-0021-9	
112	Antedependence Models for Longitudinal Data	Dale L. Zimmerman & Vicente A. Núñez-Antón	2009	ISBN 1-4200-6426-6	
113	Mixed Effects Models for Complex Data	Lang Wu	2010	ISBN 1-4200-7402-4	
114	Introduction to Time Series Modeling	Genshiro Kitagawa	2010	ISBN 1-58488-921-7	
115	Expansions and Asymptotics for Statistics	Christopher G. Small	2010	ISBN 1-58488-590-4	
116	Statistical Inference: An Integrated Bayesian/Likelihood Approach	Murray Aitkin	2010	ISBN 1-4200-9343-6	
117	Circular and Linear Regression: Fitting Circles and Lines by Least Squares	Nikolai Chernov	2010	ISBN 1-4398-3590-X	
118	Simultaneous Inference in Regression	Wei Liu	2010	ISBN 1-4398-2809-1	
119	Robust Nonparametric Statistical Methods (2nd edition)	Thomas P. Hettmansperger & Joseph W. McKean	2011	ISBN 1-4398-0908-9	
120	Statistical Inference: The Minimum Distance Approach	Ayanendranath Basu, Hiroyuki Shioya & Chanseok Park	2011	ISBN 1-4200-9965-5	
