= Wally Smith (mathematician) =

American mathematician (1926–2023)

- Born: November 12, 1926; London, England
- Died: March 6, 2023 (aged 96); Chapel Hill, North Carolina, U.S.
- Education: University of Cambridge
- Awards: Adams Prize (1960); Guggenheim Fellowship
- Scientific career
- Workplaces: University of North Carolina at Chapel Hill
- Thesis: Stochastic Sequences of Events (1954)
- Doctoral advisor: Henry Daniels; David Cox
- Website: http://www.stat.unc.edu/faculty/wsmith.html

Walter Laws Smith (November 12, 1926 – March 6, 2023) was a British-born American mathematician, known for his contributions to applied probability theory.

== Biography ==
Smith was born in London on November 12, 1926.

Smith received a B.A. in mathematics (1947) from Cambridge University, having gained First Class in the Mathematical Tripos Part 1 and Part 2. He then received an M.A. (1951) and Ph.D. (1953) from Cambridge. His dissertation was entitled Stochastic Sequences of Events advised by Henry Daniels and D. R. Cox, with whom he published the book Queues (1961) and also published with in his early years. He became a professor of statistics at The University of North Carolina Chapel Hill (1954–56 and 1958–), and he was an emeritus professor in the Department of Statistics and Operations Research.

Smith was a fellow of the Institute of Mathematical Statistics, a fellow of the American Statistical Association (1966), a winner of the Adams Prize at the University of Cambridge (1960), a Sir Winston Churchill overseas fellow and a recipient of a Guggenheim Fellowship (see List of Guggenheim Fellowships awarded in 1974)

Smith died in Chapel Hill, North Carolina, on March 6, 2023, at the age of 96.

== Publications ==
- The superimposition of several strictly periodic sequences of events, in Biometrika, 40(?), 1953. With Cox.
- A direct proof of a fundamental theorem of renewal theory, in Skandinavisk Aktuartidsskrift, 36(?), 1953
- On the superposition of renewal processes, in Biometrika, 41(1–2):91–99, 1954. With Cox.
- A note on truncation and sufficient statistics in The Annals of Mathematical Statistics, 28(1):247–252, 1957
- On the distribution of Tribolium confusum in a container, in Biometrika, 44(?), 1957. With Cox.
- Renewal theory and its ramifications, in Journal of the Royal Statistical Society, 20(2):243–302, 1958
- On the elementary renewal theorem for non-identically distributed variables, in Pacific Journal of Mathematics, 14(2):673–699, 1964
- Congestion Theory, Proceedings of the Symposium on Congestion Theory, The University of North Carolina Monograph Series in Probability and Statistics., 1965. With William E. Wilkinson (editors).
- Necessary conditions for almost sure extinction of a branching process with random environment, Annals of Mathematical Statistics,. 39(?):2136–2140, 1968
- Branching processes in Markovian environments in Duke Mathematical Journal 38(4):749–763, 1971. With William E. Wilkinson
- Harold Hotelling 1895–1973 in The Annals of Statistics, 6(6):1173–1183, 1978
- On transient regenerative processes in Journal of Applied Probability, 23(?):52–70, 1986. With E. Murphree.
