= Linda Zhao =

Chinese statistician

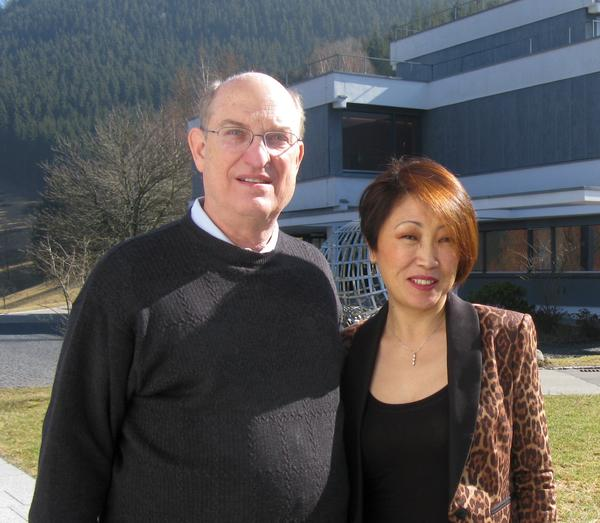
- Linda Zhao with Lawrence D. Brown
- Education: Nankai University (BS); Cornell University (PhD)
- Spouse: Lawrence D. Brown
- Scientific career
- Fields: Statistics
- Workplaces: University of California, Los Angeles; University of Pennsylvania
- Thesis: Frequentist and Bayesian aspects of some nonparametric estimation problems (1993)
- Doctoral advisor: Lawrence D. Brown

Linda Hong Zhao is a Chinese-American statistician. She is a Professor of Statistics and at the Wharton School of the University of Pennsylvania. She is a Fellow of the Institute of Mathematical Statistics. Zhao specializes in modern machine learning methods.

== Early life and education ==
In 1982, Zhao obtained her Bachelor of Science from the Department of Mathematics at Nankai University. She later emigrated to the United States and attended Cornell University, where she obtained her Ph.D from the Department of Statistics in 1993.

== Career ==
Zhao became an assistant professor statistics at University of California, Los Angeles in 1993, before joining the Wharton School in 1994, where she is currently a Professor of Statistics.

Her specialty falls in modern machine learning methods, replicability in science, high dimensional data, housing price prediction, and Bayesian methods. Current projects include equity ownership network, and its relationship to firm performance and innovation activities; identify signals from noisy data using non-parametric Bayesian scheme; and model-free data analysis. Her work has won National Science Foundation support for over 20 years.

== Personal life ==
Zhao was married to Lawrence D. Brown (1940–2018), a fellow statistician at the Wharton School.

== Honors and awards ==
- Fellow, Institute of Mathematical Statistics, 2017

== Selected publications ==
- Zhao, L. H. (2000) Bayesian aspects of some nonparametric problems, The Annals of Statistics, 28, 532–552. doi:10.1214/aos/1016218229
- Mao, V. and Zhao, L. H. (2003) Free knot polynomial splines with confidence intervals, Journal of the Royal Statistical Society, Series B, 65, 901-919. doi:10.1046/j.1369-7412.2003.00422.x
- Berk, R., Brown, L.B. and Zhao, L. (2010) Statistical inference after model selection, Journal of Quantitative Criminology, 26, 217-236 doi:10.1007/s10940-009-9077-7
- Nagaraja, C. H., Brown, L.D. and Zhao, L. (2010) An autoregressive approach to house price modeling, to appear The Annals of Applied Statistics. doi:10.1214/10-AOAS380
