= Martin Wainwright =

Martin Wainwright may refer to:

- Martin Wainwright (journalist), a British journalist and author
- Martin Wainwright (statistician) (born 1973), a statistician
