= Martin Wainwright (statistician) =

Statistician (born 1973)

- Born: 1973 (age 52–53)
- Education: University of Waterloo (B.Math); Harvard University (M.S.); Massachusetts Institute of Technology (Ph.D.)
- Awards: Sloan Research Fellowship (2005); National Science Foundation CAREER Award (2006); COPSS Presidents' Award (2014); Guggenheim Fellowship (2024)
- Scientific career
- Fields: Statistics, machine learning
- Workplaces: University of California, Berkeley; Massachusetts Institute of Technology
- Thesis: Stochastic processes on graphs with cycles: geometric and variational approaches (2002)
- Doctoral advisor: Alan S. Willsky; Tommi S. Jaakkola
- Other academic advisors: Michael I. Jordan
- Website: wainwrigwork.github.io

Martin James Wainwright (born 1973) is a statistician and the Cecil H. Green Professor in Electrical Engineering and Computer Science and Mathematics at the Massachusetts Institute of Technology (MIT), a position he has held since July 2022. At MIT, Wainwright is also affiliated with the Laboratory for Information and Decision Systems, where he is a principal investigator, and a member of the Statistics and Data Science Center.

Before joining MIT in 2022, Wainwright was part of the faculty at the University of California, Berkeley, where he held the Howard Friesen Chair at the time of his departure.

== Education and career ==
Wainwright earned a bachelor's degree in mathematics from the University of Waterloo in 1994 and a master's degree in vision science from Harvard University in 1998. In 2002, Wainwright completed his Ph.D. in electrical engineering and computer science at the Massachusetts Institute of Technology (MIT) under the supervision of Alan S. Willsky and Tommi S. Jaakkola. His dissertation, which he developed at the MIT Laboratory for Information and Decision Systems, was titled Stochastic processes on graphs with cycles: geometric and variational approaches. For his thesis, Wainwright received the electrical engineering and computer science department's George M. Sprowls Award for the best Ph.D. thesis in computer science.

Following his Ph.D., Wainwright moved to the University of California, Berkeley, where he was a postdoctoral researcher for Michael I. Jordan from 2002 to 2004. In the fall of 2004, he joined the faculty at the University of California, Berkeley with a joint appointment between the Department of Statistics and the Department of Electrical Engineering and Computer Sciences.

In July 2022, he returned to MIT, becoming the Cecil H. Green Professor in both the Department of Electrical Engineering and Computer Science, where he is in the Faculty of Artificial Intelligence and Decision-Making, and the Department of Mathematics.

== Awards and recognition ==
Wainwright has received multiple awards for his work, including the COPSS Presidents' Award from the Committee of Presidents of Statistical Societies in 2014 for his "fundamental and ground-breaking contributions to high-dimensional statistics, graphical modelling, machine learning, optimization and algorithms ..., as well as new methodology with wide-ranging implications for numerous applications". From the Institute of Mathematical Statistics, he received a Medallion Award and Lecture in 2013 and the Blackwell Award and Lecture in 2017.

He was awarded a Sloan Research Fellowship in 2005, National Science Foundation CAREER Award in 2006, and a Guggenheim Fellowship in 2024.

Wainwright was selected as a Fellow of the Institute of Mathematical Statistics in 2014 "for his fundamental research in statistical machine learning and high-dimensional statistics".

== Publications ==
In addition to numerous peer-reviewed articles in journals and conference proceedings, Wainwright has (co-)authored the following three books:

- Wainwright, Martin J.; Jordan, Michael I. (2008). "Graphical Models, Exponential Families, and Variational Inference". Foundations and Trends in Machine Learning. 1 (1–2): 1–305. doi:10.1561/2200000001. ISBN 978-1-60198-184-4.
- Hastie, Trevor; Tibshirani, Robert; Wainwright, Martin (2015). Statistical Learning with Sparsity: the Lasso and Generalizations. Monographs on Statistics and Applied Probability. Vol. 143. New York: Chapman and Hall/CRC. doi:10.1201/b18401. ISBN 978-1-4987-1216-3.
- Wainwright, Martin J. (2019). High-Dimensional Statistics: A Non-Asymptotic Viewpoint. Cambridge Series in Statistical and Probabilistic Mathematics. Vol. 48. Cambridge University Press. doi:10.1017/9781108627771. ISBN 978-1-108-49802-9.
