= Jianwen =

Jianwen is a toneless pinyin transliteration of multiple Chinese-language given names. Notable people with such a name include:

== Emperors ==
- Emperor Jianwen of Jin (Chinese: 晋简文帝; 320–372, reigned 371–372), Jin dynasty emperor
- Emperor Jianwen of Liang (Chinese: 梁簡文帝; 503–551, reigned 549–551), Liang dynasty emperor
- Jianwen Emperor (Chinese: 建文帝; 1377–1402, reigned 1398–1402), Ming dynasty emperor

== Others ==
- Jianwen Cai, Chinese and American biostatistician
- Chen Jianwen (Chinese: 陈建文; born 1965), Chinese politician
- Hu Jianwen (born 1987), Chinese Paralympic athlete
- Wang Jianwen (Chinese: 王建文; born 1988), Chinese football midfielder
