= Silvey =

Silvey is a surname. Notable people with the surname include:

- Anita Silvey (born 1947), American author, editor, and literary critic
- Ben Silvey (1894–1948), American assistant director, producer, and production manager
- Craig Silvey (born 1982), Australian novelist
- Ryan Silvey (born 1976), American politician
- Samuel D. Silvey, British statistician
- Shirley Silvey (1927–2010), American animator
- Susie Silvey (born 1956), English actress, dancer and model
