= Samuel Kou =

Chinese-American statistician (born 1974)

- Born: 1974 (age 51–52); Lanzhou, China
- Other name: S.C. Kou
- Education: Peking University; Stanford University
- Scientific career
- Fields: Statistics
- Workplaces: Harvard University
- Thesis: Extended Exponential Criterion: A New Selection Procedure for Scatterplot Smoothers (2001)
- Doctoral advisor: Bradley Efron
- Website: www.people.fas.harvard.edu/~skou/

Shingchang "Samuel" Kou (Chinese: 寇星昌; born in 1974) is a Chinese American statistician and Professor of Statistics at Harvard University.

== Biography ==
He earned a bachelor's degree in computational mathematics at Peking University. He graduated in 1997 and then moved to the United States to study statistics at Stanford University under Bradley Efron. He earned his Ph.D. in 2001 and subsequently joined the statistics faculty at Harvard University.

In 2008, he became a full professor of statistics at Harvard.

== Honors and awards ==
In 2007, he was elected a fellow of the American Statistical Association. In 2013, he was awarded a Guggenheim fellowship.

He received the COPSS Presidents' Award in 2012. The reason for receiving the award was described as follows:

For groundbreaking contributions to stochastic modeling and statistical inference in single molecule biophysics; for pioneering the equi-energy sampler; for fundamental contributions to Bayesian, empirical Bayes and nonparametric methods; and for outstanding service to the statistical profession and contribution to statistical education.

== Selected publications ==
- S. C. Kou, Qing Zhou, and Wing Hung Wong. "Equi-energy sampler with applications in statistical inference and statistical mechanics". Annals of Statistics, 34(4), 1581–1619, 2006.
