= Roček =

Roček and Rocek (feminine (native form): Ročková, Rockova) are Slavic surnames. Roček is a Czech surname, pronounced "Rochek". Notable people with the surname include:

- Aisha Rocek, Italian female rower
- František Roček (1960–1928), Austrian lawyer and politician
- Martin Roček, professor of theoretical physics
- Miroslav Roček (born 1943), Czech politician, MP
- Patrick Rocek (born 1998), Italian world champion rower
- Pavla Ročková, Czech figure skater, gold medalist at 1997 Czech Figure Skating Championships
- Roman Roček (1935–2013), Austrian journalist and author
- Veronika Ročková (born 1985), Czech-American statistician
