= Bernard Lewis Welch =

British statistician

- Born: 1911
- Died: December 1989 (aged 77–78)
- Known for: Welch's t-test
- Scientific career
- Fields: Statistics
- Doctoral students: David Cox

Bernard Lewis Welch (1911 – 29 December 1989) was a British statistician and educator. He is known for creating Welch's t-test.

== Biography ==
Born in 1911 in Sunderland in County Durham, the youngest of four brothers, Welch was educated at the Bede School. He attended Brasenose College, Oxford, where he was captain of the college cricket team for two years. Welch graduated, first class, in mathematics in 1933.

Welch then attended University College London to study statistics. Pearson and Fisher were creating a centre at the College for studies in statistical inference and the use of statistical methods in biological science. Welch made his own distinctive theoretical contribution there and committed himself to furthering the explosive impact that statistics was beginning to make in industrial and agricultural fields.

Welch was a founder of the Industrial and Agricultural Research Section of the Royal Statistical Society. He also became joint editor of the corresponding supplement to the journal of the Society (now Series B). Welch also served on the editorial board of Biometrika. He read a paper to the Society (Series A) in 1970 entitled 'Statistics—a vocational or a cultural study?' which still remains an open issue.

From 1939 to 1946 Welch served as a Scientific Officer on the Ordnance Board of the Ministry of Supply. He then returned to academic life by way of an appointment to a Readership in Statistics in the then Department of Mathematics in the University of Leeds. Leeds was then one of the few universities that had a statistician on its mathematical staff. Welch was appointed to the Chair in Statistics in 1968. Following the establishment of the School of Mathematics, he was appointed Head of the newly created Department of Statistics where he remained until his retirement

Welch retired in 1976. In June 1989, he suffered a stroke; on 29 December 1989 Welch died as a result of it.
