= International Prize in Statistics =

- Awarded for: Outstanding scientific work in the field of Statistics
- First award: 2016
- Website: www.statprize.org

The International Prize in Statistics is awarded every two years to an individual or team "for major achievements using statistics to advance science, technology and human welfare". The International Prize in Statistics, along with the COPSS Presidents' Award, are the two highest honours in the field of Statistics.

The prize is modelled after the Nobel Prizes, Abel Prize, Fields Medal and Turing Award and comes with a monetary award of $80,000. The award ceremony takes place during the World Statistics Congress.

== Laureates ==
| Year | Laureate(s) | Citizenship(s) | Institution(s) | Citation |
|---|---|---|---|---|
| 2017 | David Cox | British | Imperial College London, University of Oxford | "For Survival Analysis Model Applied in Medicine, Science and Engineering". |
| 2019 | Bradley Efron | American | Caltech, Stanford University | For the bootstrap |
| 2021 | Nan Laird | American | Harvard T.H. Chan School of Public Health | For her work on powerful methods that have made possible the analysis of complex longitudinal studies |
| 2023 | Calyampudi Radhakrishna Rao | Indian–American | Indian Statistical Institute, Cambridge University, Pennsylvania State University, University at Buffalo | For his work more than 75 years ago which continues to exert a profound influence on science, including the Cramér–Rao lower bound, the Rao–Blackwell theorem, and a result that provided insights that pioneered the interdisciplinary field of information geometry. |
| 2025 | Grace Wahba | American | Stanford University, University of Maryland, College Park, Cornell University, University of Wisconsin–Madison | For her ground-breaking work on smoothing splines, which has transformed modern data analysis and machine learning. |

== Rules ==
The prize recognizes a single work or body of work, representing a powerful and original idea that had an impact in other disciplines or a practical effect on the world. The recipient must be alive when the prize is awarded.

== Organization ==
The prize is awarded by the International Prize in Statistics Foundation, which comprises representatives of the following major learned societies:

- American Statistical Association
- International Biometric Society
- Institute of Mathematical Statistics
- International Statistical Institute
- Royal Statistical Society

In addition to recognizing the contributions of a statistician, the Foundation also aims at educating the public about statistical innovations and their impact on the world and gaining wider recognition for the field.

The recipient of the prize is chosen by a selection committee comprising international experts in the field. As of 2016, the committee members were Xiao-Li Meng (Harvard University), Sally Morton (Virginia Tech), Stephen Senn (Luxembourg Institute of Health), Bernard Silverman (University of Oxford), Stephen Stigler (University of Chicago), Susan Wilson (Australian National University) and Bin Yu (University of California, Berkeley). As of May 2022, the members of the selection committee are Yoav Benjamini, Francisco Cribari-Neto, Vijay Nair, Sonia Petrone, Nancy Reid, Sylvia Richardson, and Jane-Ling Wang.

== See also ==
- List of mathematics awards
- COPSS Distinguished Achievement Award and Lectureship
- Rousseeuw Prize for Statistics
