= Bradley Efron =

American statistician

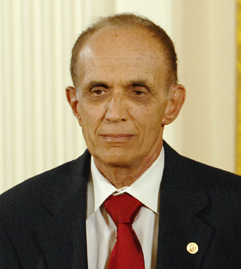
- Born: May 24, 1938 (age 88); Saint Paul, Minnesota, USA
- Education: California Institute of Technology, Stanford University
- Known for: Bootstrap method
- Awards: National Medal of Science (2005); BBVA Foundation Frontiers of Knowledge Award (2016); International Prize in Statistics (2019)
- Scientific career
- Fields: Statistics
- Workplaces: Stanford University
- Thesis: Problems in Probability of a Geometric Nature (1964)
- Doctoral advisor: Rupert G. Miller; Herbert Solomon
- Doctoral students: Norman Breslow; Robert Tibshirani; Samuel Kou; James H. Ware

Bradley Efron (/ˈɛfrən/; born May 24, 1938) is an American statistician. Efron has been president of the American Statistical Association (2004) and of the Institute of Mathematical Statistics (1987–1988). He is a past editor (for theory and methods) of the Journal of the American Statistical Association, and he is the founding editor of the Annals of Applied Statistics. Efron is also the recipient of many awards (see below).

Efron is especially known for proposing the bootstrap resampling technique, which has had a major impact in the field of statistics and virtually every area of statistical application. The bootstrap was one of the first computer-intensive statistical techniques, replacing traditional algebraic derivations with data-based computer simulations.

== Life and career ==
Efron was born in St. Paul, Minnesota in May 1938, the son of Russian Jewish immigrants Esther and Miles Efron. He attended the California Institute of Technology, graduating in mathematics in 1960. By his own admission he "had no talent for modern abstract math". His interest in statistics emerged after reading a Harald Cramér book cover to cover. Soon later, he arrived at Stanford in fall of 1960, earning his Ph.D., under the direction of Rupert Miller and Herbert Solomon, in the Department of Statistics. While at Stanford, he was suspended for six months for his involvement with the Stanford Chaparral's parody of Playboy magazine.

He is currently a professor of Statistics and Biostatistics at Stanford. At Stanford he has been the Chair of the Department of Statistics, Associate Dean of the School of Humanities and Sciences, Chairman of the University Advisory Board, Chair of the Faculty Senate, and co-director of the undergraduate-level Mathematical & Computational Science Program.

Efron holds the Max H. Stein endowed chair as Professor of Humanities and Sciences at Stanford.

He has made many important contributions to many areas of statistics. Efron's work has spanned both theoretical and applied topics, including empirical Bayes analysis (with Carl Morris), applications of differential geometry to statistical inference, the analysis of survival data, and inference for microarray gene expression data. He is the author of a classic monograph, The Jackknife, the Bootstrap and Other Resampling Plans (1982) and has also co-authored (with Robert Tibshirani) the text An Introduction to the Bootstrap (1994).

He created a set of intransitive dice called Efron's dice.

== Awards ==
Efron has been given many honors, including a MacArthur Prize Fellowship, membership in the National Academy of Sciences and the American Academy of Arts and Sciences, fellowship in the Institute of Mathematical Statistics (IMS) and the American Statistical Association (ASA), the Lester R. Ford Award, the Wilks Medal, the Parzen Prize, and the Rao Prize, Fisher, Rietz, and Wald lecturer.

In 2005, he was awarded the National Medal of Science, the highest scientific honor by the United States, for his exceptional work in the field of Statistics (especially for his inventing of the bootstrap resampling technique). He was presented with the award on May 29, 2007.

In 2014, he was awarded the Guy Medal in Gold.

In 2016, Efron was chosen to receive the BBVA Foundation Frontiers of Knowledge Award in the Basic Sciences category jointly with David Cox, for the development of “pioneering and hugely influential” statistical methods, in Efron's case again especially the bootstrap resampling technique.

He received the International Prize in Statistics at the 2019 World Statistics Congress.

== Selected publications ==
- Efron, B.; Hinkley, D. V. (1978). "Assessing the accuracy of the maximum likelihood estimator: Observed versus expected Fisher Information". Biometrika. 65 (3): 457–487. doi:10.1093/biomet/65.3.457. JSTOR 2335893. MR 0521817.
- Bradley Efron (1979). "Bootstrap Methods: Another Look at the Jackknife". The Annals of Statistics. 7 (1): 1–26. doi:10.1214/aos/1176344552.
- Efron, B. (1979). "Computers and the theory of statistics: thinking the unthinkable". SIAM Review.
- Efron B (1981). "Nonparametric estimates of standard error: The jackknife, the bootstrap and other methods". Biometrika. 68 (3): 589–599. doi:10.1093/biomet/68.3.589.
- Efron, B. (1982). "The jackknife, the bootstrap, and other resampling plans". Society of Industrial and Applied Mathematics CBMS-NSF Monographs, 38.
- Diaconis, P. & Efron, B. (1983). "Computer-intensive methods in statistics". Scientific American, May, 116–130.
- Efron, B. (1983). "Estimating the error rate of a prediction rule: improvement on cross-validation". Journal of the American Statistical Association
- Efron, B. (1985). "Bootstrap confidence intervals for a class of parametric problems." Biometrika.
- Efron, B. (1987). "Better bootstrap confidence intervals". Journal of the American Statistical Association
- Efron, B. (1990). "More efficient bootstrap computations". Journal of the American Statistical Association
- Efron, B. (1991). "Regression percentiles using asymmetric squared error loss". Statistica sinica.
- Efron, B. (1992). "Jackknife-after-bootstrap standards errors and influence functions". in Journal of the Royal Statistical Society
- Efron, B., & Tibshirani, R. J. (1993). "An introduction to the bootstrap". New York: Chapman & Hall, software.
- Bradley Efron; Robert Tibshirani (1994). An Introduction to the Bootstrap. Chapman & Hall/CRC. ISBN 978-0-412-04231-7.
- Bradley Efron; Trevor Hastie (2016). Computer Age Statistical Inference. Cambridge University Press. ISBN 9781107149892.

== See also ==
- Clinical trials
- Empirical Bayesian
- Fisher, Ronald
- Least-angle regression
- Fisher information
- Hinkley, David V.
- Likelihood function
- Observed information
- Robbins, Herbert
- Sequential analysis
- Stein, Charles
