= Lee-Jen Wei =

Taiwanese-American professor of biostatistics

- 魏立人
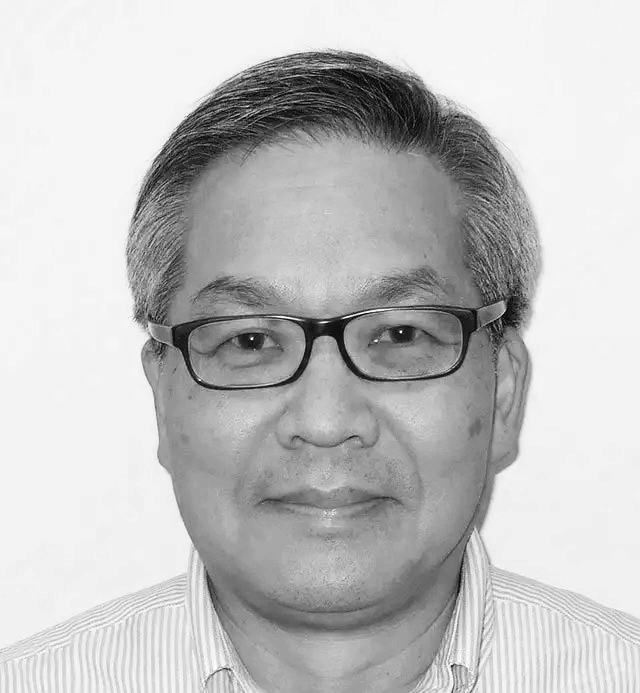
- Education: Fu Jen Catholic University (BS); University of Wisconsin–Madison (PhD)
- Scientific career
- Fields: Biostatistics
- Workplaces: University of South Carolina; George Washington University; University of Wisconsin–Madison; University of Michigan; Harvard University
- Thesis: The design of sequential experiments (1975)
- Doctoral advisor: Stephen Stigler
- Doctoral students: Tianxi Cai

Lee-Jen Wei (Chinese: 魏立人) is a Taiwanese-American biostatistician who is a professor of biostatistics at Harvard University.

== Education ==
Wei graduated from Fu Jen Catholic University with a Bachelor of Science in mathematics in 1970. He then earned his Ph.D. from the University of Wisconsin–Madison in 1975.

== Academic career ==
Before joining the faculty of Harvard University, he was a tenured professor of Biostatistics and Statistics at the University of South Carolina, University of Wisconsin–Madison, the University of Michigan, and the George Washington University from 1982 to 1991. He was named Cancer Expert by The National Cancer Institute in 1980.

He has been a tenured professor of biostatistics at Harvard University since 1991 and was the co-director of the Bioinformatics Core at the Harvard School of Public Health from 2003 to 2007. From 2003 to 2004, he served as the acting chair of the Department of Biostatistics at Harvard University. Under his supervision, the department successfully converted the doctor of science degree program in biostatistics (a professional degree) to a conventional (art and sciences) Ph.D. program at the Harvard Graduate School. This was an important accomplishment since the department had tried this conversion for more than 20 years without success.

== Research and contributions ==
Wei has developed and published a number of novel quantitative methods for analyzing data from experimental and observational studies. Specifically, he has published many papers on monitoring drug and device safety and related topics. The resulting procedures have been utilized for various drug and device regulatory evaluations involving safety issues. His extensive experience in quantitative science for making inferences about the drug and device safety is readily applicable to the general industry product safety issues.

Wei has also served on numerous Data Safety Monitoring Boards for experimental studies for the drug industry. And has moreover been intimately involved in designing, monitoring and analyzing various kinds of studies in assessing postmarketing surveillance data to identify signals of safety concerns.

Wei's scholarly writings include over 130 articles in peer-reviewed academic journals. He is responsible for developing numerous novel statistical methods for practitioners. Many of these methods have been included in the most commonly used statistical packages such as SAS, S-plus, and R. He has additionally served on the editorial boards of a number of statistical journals and am an elected Fellow of the American Statistical Association and Institute of Mathematical Statistics.

== Awards and recognition ==
In 1986 he was elected as a Fellow of the American Statistical Association.

In 1999 he was awarded the Outstanding Alumni Award of Fu Jen Catholic University.

Professor Wei was named “Statistician of the Year” in 2007 by the Boston Chapter of the American Statistical Association.

The American Statistical Association gave him the Wilks Memorial Award in 2009 "for statistical methods used in clinical trials", which is one of the most prestigious awards among all the international statistical societies.
