= Joyce Snell =

British statistician (1930–2024)

Eleanor Joyce Snell (née Warner; 5 September 1930 – 23 February 2024) was a British statistician who taught in the mathematics department at Imperial College London.

== Life and career ==
Snell was born in Leeds, England on 5 September 1930. She was known for her work on residuals and ordered categorical data, and for her books on statistics. Snell died on 23 February 2024, aged 93, after becoming unwell whilst on holiday.

== Books ==
Snell was the author or editor of:

- Analysis of Binary Data (with David R. Cox, 1969; 2nd ed., Chapman & Hall/CRC, 1989)
- Applied Statistics: Principles and Examples (with David R. Cox, Chapman & Hall/CRC, 1981)
- Applied Statistics: A Handbook of GENSTAT Analyses (with H. R. Simpson, 1982)
- Applied Statistics: A Handbook of BMDP Analyses (Chapman & Hall/CRC, 1987)
- Statistical Theory and Modelling: in Honour of Sir David Cox, FRS (edited with David Hinkley and Nancy Reid, Chapman & Hall/CRC, 1991)

== Recognition ==
Snell was given the Chambers Medal of the Royal Statistical Society in 1986 "for her outstanding service to the Society", and in particular for her work organising the 150th anniversary celebration for the society.
