= Naomi Altman =

Statistician

- Citizenship: United States
- Education: University of Toronto; Stanford University
- Scientific career
- Workplaces: Cornell University; Penn State University

Academic background
- Thesis: Smoothing Data with Correlated Errors (1988)
- Academic advisor: Iain M. Johnstone

Naomi Altman is a statistician known for her work on kernel smoothing^{[KS]} and kernel regression,^{[KR]} and interested in applications of statistics to gene expression and genomics. She is a professor of statistics at Pennsylvania State University, and a regular columnist for the "Points of Significance" column in Nature Methods.

== Education and career ==
Altman studied mathematics at the University of Toronto, graduating in 1974, and spent two years teaching at Government Teacher's Training College in Lafia, Nigeria. Returning to Canada, she earned a master's degree in statistics from Toronto in 1979.

After working as a statistical consultant at Simon Fraser University and the University of British Columbia, she completed her doctorate in statistics in 1988 at Stanford University. Her dissertation, supervised by Iain M. Johnstone, was Smoothing Data with Correlated Errors.

She joined the Cornell University faculty, in the Biometrics Unit, and became chair of the Department of Biometrics there from 1997 to 2000. She moved to Penn State in 2001.

== Recognition ==
Altman and her coauthor Julio C. Villarreal won the 2005 Canadian Journal of Statistics Award for their paper "Self-modelling regression for longitudinal data with time-invariant covariates".^{[AV]} In 2009, Altman became a Fellow of the American Statistical Association.

== Selected publications ==
KS.	Altman, N. S. (September 1990), "Kernel smoothing of data with correlated errors", Journal of the American Statistical Association, 85 (411): 749–759, doi:10.1080/01621459.1990.10474936, hdl:1813/33092, JSTOR 2290011

KR.	Altman, N. S. (August 1992), "An introduction to kernel and nearest-neighbor nonparametric regression", The American Statistician, 46 (3): 175–185, doi:10.1080/00031305.1992.10475879, hdl:1813/31637, JSTOR 2685209

AV.	Altman, Naomi; Villarreal, Julio (September 2004), "Self-modelling regression for longitudinal data with time-invariant covariates", Canadian Journal of Statistics, 32 (3): 251–268, doi:10.2307/3315928, JSTOR 3315928, S2CID 5763479
