= Paul Fearnhead =

British statistician, University of Lancaster

- Education: University of Oxford
- Scientific career
- Workplaces: Lancaster University
- Thesis: Sequential Monte Carlo Methods in Filter Theory (1998)
- Doctoral advisor: Peter Clifford
- Other academic advisors: Peter Donnelly
- Website: www.maths.lancs.ac.uk/~fearnhea/

Paul Fearnhead is the Distinguished Professor of Statistics at Lancaster University. He is a researcher in computational statistics, in particular Sequential Monte Carlo methods. His interests include changepoint analysis, sampling theory and genetics – he has published several papers working on the epidemiology of campylobacter by looking at recombination events in a large sample of genomes. Since January 2018 he has been the editor of Biometrika.

== Awards ==
Fearnhead won the Adams Prize in 2007.

In 2007 he also won the Guy Medal in Bronze of the Royal Statistical Society.
