= Claudio Di Veroli =

Argentine-Italian harpsichordist

- Born: 1946 (age 79–80); Buenos Aires, Argentina

Claudio Di Veroli (born 1946) is an Argentine-Italian harpsichordist who has written several books and papers on baroque performance practice. Born in Buenos Aires, Argentina, he was raised in an Italian family and attended Italian primary and secondary school. He studied privately in Buenos Aires under Ernesto Epstein (piano and interpretation), Erwin Leuchter (harmony) and Ljerko Spiller (chamber music), obtained a degree in mathematics from the University of Buenos Aires and a PhD in statistics from Imperial College, London, under the supervision of Prof. Sir David Cox (statistician). Living in Europe in the early 70's he studied harpsichord with Colin Tilney in London and Hubert Bédard in Paris.

He then returned to Buenos Aires, where he pioneered the performance of Baroque music based on ancient practices. He was Professor of Harpsichord and examiner of the Organ course at the Conservatorio Nacional in Buenos Aires. As a soloist he has performed extensively in concert halls, churches and television, both solo and with ensembles. After a harpsichord recital a reviewer observed that he "did not miss any detail in order to complete the historical legitimacy of his performance, and also produced a logical, live expressivness". After another concert the same reviewer noted his "virtuosity in the formidable 'Cadenza' of the Fifth Brandenburg Concerto", a performance which was the world's first contemporary one with Baroque fingerings.

He moved to Ireland in 2001 and to Italy in 2014; in both countries he has offered recitals and masterclasses on the interpretation of Baroque keyboard music.

Di Veroli is the author of several books and papers. Favourable reviews have appeared in Stimulus, Early Music America and the British Clavichord Society Newsletter.

== Major works ==
- Unequal Temperaments and their Role in the Performance of Early Music (1978).
- Baroque Keyboard Fingering: a Method (2008, 2024).
- Unequal Temperaments: Theory, History and Practice (2009, 2021).
- Playing the Baroque Harpsichord: essays on the instrument, interpretation and performance, with relevant topics for the clavichord and organ (2010, 2022).
- Baroque Keyboard Masterpieces Fingered with Baroque Technique (2011, 2020).
- J.S. Bach's Six Keyboard Partitas with Baroque Fingerings and a Performance Guide (2015).
- Baroque Keyboard Ornamentation: the Interpretation of Baroque Ornaments and Embellishments (2025).
