= Mike Titterington =

Scottish statistician

Mike Titterington FRSS FRSE
- Born: Donald Michael Titterington; 1945; Marple
- Died: 2023
- Education: University of Edinburgh; University of Cambridge
- Awards: Guy Medal (Silver) (2006)
- Scientific career
- Fields: Statistics
- Workplaces: University of Glasgow
- Thesis: The Adaptive Optimisation of Yield (1972)
- Doctoral advisor: Peter Whittle

Mike Titterington (1945–2023) was a Scottish statistician known for the breadth of his work. Perhaps best known for his work on mixture models and neural networks, he also published in optimal design, smoothing techniques, image analysis, spatial statistics and hidden Markov models.

Titterington was educated at the High School of Stirling before going on to the University of Edinburgh (obtaining a first class degree) then a Diploma in Mathematical Statistics (with distinction) from the University of Cambridge. Under Peter Whittle at Cambridge he continued to study for a PhD on stochastic nonlinear control.

Post-PhD, Titterington spent his entire career working at the Department of Statistics at the University of Glasgow: first research assistant, then lecturer. He was appointed as a professor in 1982 and chair of statistics in 1988 before retiring in 2011. During this time he was editor of several statistics journals, including the Journal of the Royal Statistical Society, Series B (1986–89) and Biometrika (1996–2007). He edited (with David Cox) "Biometrika: One Hundred Years", collecting notable papers from the journal. He also was involved in the Royal Statistical Society (roles including honorary secretary and chair of the research section and vice president).

The Guy Medal in Silver was awarded to Titterington in 2006 for his 1981 paper on discrimination methods and "for his important contributions to many areas of statistics, including the analysis of mixtures, incomplete data, latent structure analysis, neural networks, pattern recognition and machine learning, statistical smoothing, medical statistics and the design of experiments."

He was a good friend of Peter Hall, for whom he wrote an obituary in the Royal Statistical Society and American Statistical Association magazine Significance. The pair authored 21 papers together.

Titterington died in April 2023 after having been affected for many years by Parkinson's disease.

== Honours ==
- Fellow of the Institute of Mathematical Statistics in (1986)
- Fellow of the Royal Society of Edinburgh (1991)
- Member of the International Statistical Institute (1991)
- Royal Statistical Society Guy Medal in Silver (2006)
- Mahalanobis Lecturer by the Indian Statistical Institute (2007)
