= Larry A. Wasserman =

Canadian statistician

Larry Alan Wasserman
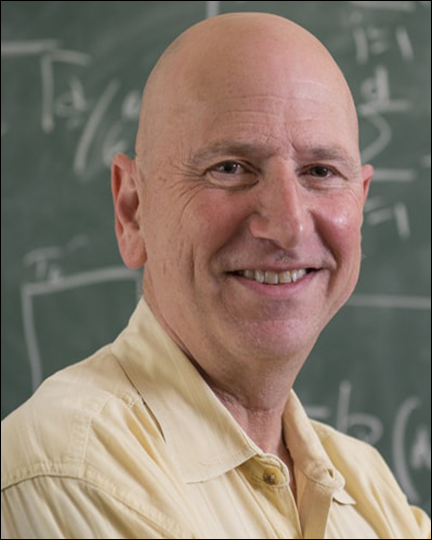
- Born: 1959 (age 66–67); Windsor, Ontario, Canada
- Education: University of Toronto (Ph.D, 1988)
- Awards: American Statistical Association Fellow (1996); COPSS Presidents' Award (1999); CRM-SSC Prize (2002); Institute of Mathematical Statistics Fellow (2004); DeGroot Prize (2005); AAAS Fellow (2010); NAS Member (2016)
- Scientific career
- Fields: Statistics; machine Learning
- Workplaces: Carnegie Mellon University
- Doctoral advisor: Robert Tibshirani
- Website: www.stat.cmu.edu/~larry/

Larry Alan Wasserman (born 1959) is a Canadian-American statistician and a professor in the Department of Statistics & Data Science and the Machine Learning Department at Carnegie Mellon University.

== Biography ==
Wasserman received his Ph.D. from the University of Toronto in 1988 under the supervision of Robert Tibshirani.

He received the COPSS Presidents' Award in 1999 and the CRM-SSC Prize in 2002.

He was elected a fellow of the American Statistical Association in 1996, of the Institute of Mathematical Statistics in 2004, and of the American Association for the Advancement of Science in 2011. He was elected to National Academy of Sciences in May, 2016.

== Selected works ==
Wasserman has written many research papers about nonparametric inference, asymptotic theory, causality, and applications of statistics to astrophysics, bioinformatics, and genetics. He has also written two advanced statistics textbooks, All of Statistics and All of Nonparametric Statistics.

- 2004. All of Statistics: A Concise Course in Statistical Inference. Springer-Verlag, New York. ISBN 978-0387402727

won DeGroot Prize 2005.

- 2006. All of Nonparametric Statistics. Springer. ISBN 978-0-387-25145-5
- 2013. Topological Inference. Rietz Lecture 2013.

== Honors and awards ==
- 2016, Member of National Academy of Sciences

Wasserman was elected to National Academy of Sciences in recognition of his distinguished and continuing achievement in original research.

== See also ==
- Peer review
- Computational thinking
