= Helen ApSimon =

English climatologist and academic

Professor Helen ApSimon CBE
- Born: Helen Mary Hollingsworth; 28 April 1942 (age 84)
- Citizenship: United Kingdom
- Education: Somerville College, Oxford; University of St Andrews
- Scientific career
- Fields: Air pollution studies
- Workplaces: Imperial College London
- Doctoral students: Anthony C. Davison

Helen Mary ApSimon, CBE (born 28 April 1942) is an English air pollution scientist and academic. She is a professor of Air pollution Studies at Imperial College London. Her research includes the impact of acid rain, nuclear accidents and fine particulates on human health and ecosystems.

== Early life and education ==
Helen Mary Hollingsworth was born on 28 April 1942 in Ashby-de-la-Zouch, Leicestershire, England. She was educated at Northampton High School, an all-girls private school in Northampton, Northamptonshire. She went on to study mathematics at Somerville College, Oxford, graduating MA in 1963. She completed a PhD in astrophysics under Dick Carson at the University of St Andrews in 1966. In 1967, Helen Hollingsworth married Hugh ApSimon. He died in 1998.

== Research ==
ApSimon is a founding member and Chairman of the European Association for the Science of Air Pollution. ApSimon is well known for her research into the transport of radioactivity from the Chernobyl disaster. In the immediate aftermath, Russia issued a media blackout and ApSimon was one of few European scientists to detect rising radiation levels. She modelled the nuclear fallout, calculating Chernobyl released 15 – 20 megacuries of Iodine-131 and 1 – 2 megacuries of caesium-137. During the first few weeks after the disaster, ApSimon calculated the radioactive plum covered Scandinavia and the North coast of Europe. She travelled to Hungary, Poland, Czechoslovakia and Bulgaria in 1988.

ApSimon has also worked extensively for Task Forces under the UN ECE Convention on Long-Range Transboundary Air Pollution, undertaking modelling and assessment of cost-effective strategies to reduce acidification, eutrophication, excess tropospheric ozone and fine particulate concentrations.

ApSimon is interested in the impact of urban air pollution on human health and ecosystems. In 1995, she calculated the cost of building damage due to acidic European atmospheres. In 1998, the UK Department of Environment, Transport and the Regions commissioned ApSimon to study investigate the cost-effectiveness of controlling the shipping emissions in the North Sea.

== Publications ==
- O'Driscoll R, Stettler MEJ, Molden N., et al., 2017, Real world CO2 and NOx emissions from 149 Euro 5 and 6 diesel, gasoline and hybrid passenger cars., Science of the Total Environment, Vol:621, ISSN 0048-9697, Pages:282–290
- Aristodemou E., Boganegra L. M., Mottet L., et al., 2017, How tall buildings affect turbulent air flows and dispersion of pollution within a neighbourhood, Environmental Pollution, Vol:233, ISSN 0269-7491, Pages:782–796
- O'Driscoll R., ApSimon H., Oxley T., et al., 2016, A portable emissions measurement system (PEMS) study of NOx and primary NO2 emissions from Euro 6 diesel passenger cars and comparison with COPERT emission factors, Atmospheric Environment, Vol:145, ISSN 1352-2310, Pages:81–91
- Dore A., Reis S., Oxley T., et al., 2016, Calculation of Source-Receptor Matrices for Use in an Integrated Assessment Model and Assessment of Impacts on Natural Ecosystems, 34th International Technical Meeting on Air Pollution Modelling and its Application (ITM), SPRINGER-VERLAG BERLIN, Pages:107–112
- Dore A., Reis S., Oxley T., et al., 2016, Calculation of Source-Receptor Matrices for Use in an Integrated Assessment Model and Assessment of Impacts on Natural Ecosystems, 34th International Technical Meeting on Air Pollution Modelling and its Application (ITM), SPRINGER INT PUBLISHING AG, Pages:107–112

== Memberships ==
ApSimon has been a member of several expert groups, including the National Expert Group on Transboundary Air Pollution, and the Air Quality Expert Group of DEFRA. In 1999, ApSimon was a member of the Royal Society Global Environmental Research Committee. In 2004, she contributed to the European Commission National Emission Ceilings Directive Review. ApSimon was invited to chair a new Heathrow air quality expert review group in 2017.

== Honours ==
In the 2013 Queen's Birthday Honours, Helen ApSimon was appointed a Commander of the Order of the British Empire (CBE) for services to air pollution science.
