= Marc A. Suchard =

American statistician (born 1972)

Marc Adam Suchard (born December 23, 1972, in California) is an American statistician. He is Professor in the Departments of Biomathematics and of Human Genetics in the David Geffen School of Medicine at UCLA and in the Department of Biostatistics in the UCLA Fielding School of Public Health at the University of California, Los Angeles. He was elected as a Fellow of the American Statistical Association in 2012, and he received the COPSS Presidents' Award in 2013.

== Selected publications ==
- Suchard, M. A., Weiss, R. E., & Sinsheimer, J. S. (2001). Bayesian selection of continuous-time Markov chain evolutionary models. Molecular Biology and Evolution, 18(6), 1001-1013.

== Awards ==
- COPSS Presidents' Award (2013)
- Mitchell Prize (2011)
- John Simon Guggenheim Fellowship (2008)
- Alfred P. Sloan Fellowship (2007)
- Mitchell Prize (2006)
- British Marshall Scholarship (1995)
