= Ryan Tibshirani =

Canadian statistician (born 1985)

Ryan J. Tibshirani
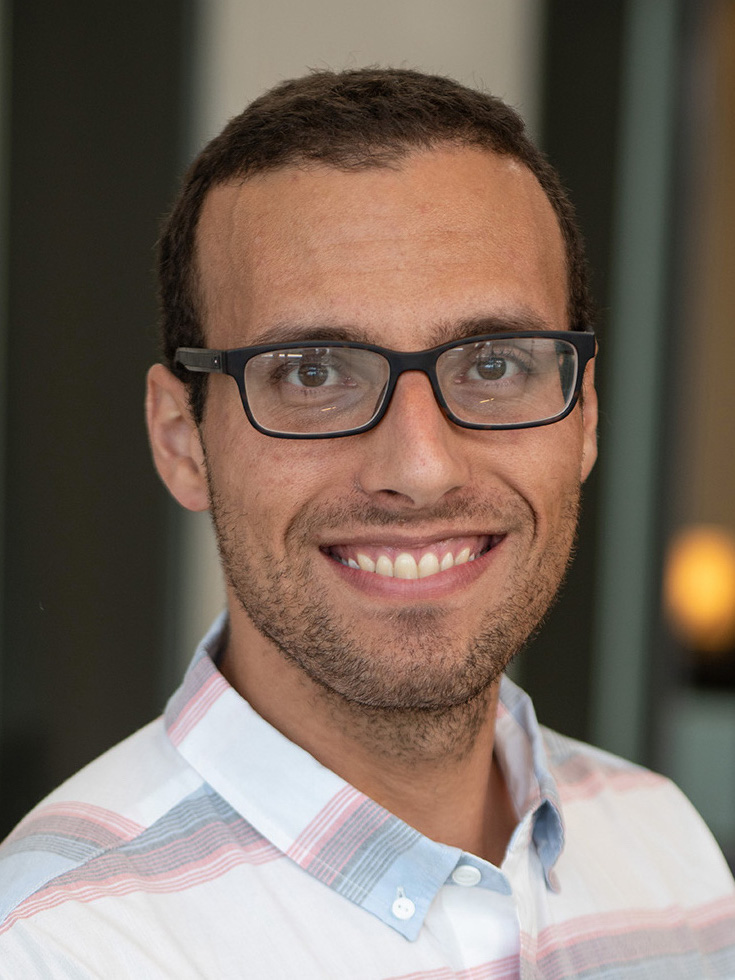
- Born: December 15, 1985 (age 40); Toronto, Canada
- Education: Stanford University (BS, PhD)
- Known for: Generalized lasso, trend filtering, selective inference, conformal prediction
- Awards: COPSS Presidents' Award (2023); Mortimer Spiegelman Award (2022); Fellow of the Institute of Mathematical Statistics (2022); NSF CAREER Award (2016)
- Scientific career
- Fields: Statistics, machine learning
- Workplaces: University of California, Berkeley
- Thesis: The Solution Path of the Generalized Lasso (2011)
- Doctoral advisor: Jonathan Taylor
- Website: www.stat.berkeley.edu/~ryantibs/

Ryan Joseph Tibshirani (born December 15, 1985) is a professor and chair of the Department of Statistics at the University of California, Berkeley. His work spans high-dimensional statistics, nonparametric estimation, distribution-free inference, convex optimization, and epidemic tracking and forecasting.

== Early life and education ==
Tibshirani was born on December 15, 1985 in Toronto, Canada. He earned a B.S. in Mathematics from Stanford University in 2007 and a Ph.D. in Statistics from Stanford in 2011; his dissertation, The Solution Path of the Generalized Lasso, was advised by Jonathan Taylor.

== Career ==
From 2011 to 2022, Tibshirani was a faculty member in the Department of Statistics and Department of Machine Learning at Carnegie Mellon University (CMU). He joined UC Berkeley in 2022 and became department chair effective July 1, 2025.

Tibshirani is a principal investigator with the Delphi Research Group, which develops epidemic tracking and forecasting systems in collaboration with the Centers for Disease Control and Prevention (CDC), as well as other partners.

In 2023, he became Editor-in-Chief of Foundations and Trends in Machine Learning, taking over from founding Editor Michael I. Jordan. In 2024, he became founding co-Editor-in-Chief of Foundations and Trends in Statistics with Rina Foygel Barber.

== Research ==
Tibshirani’s research focuses on methodology and theory for high-dimensional and nonparametric problems, often connecting statistical inference with convex optimization. He has made important contributions to regularization and sparsity methods, including the lasso, generalized lasso, and trend filtering, developing both theoretical guarantees and efficient algorithms. He has also contributed to selective inference, to distribution-free predictive inference (conformal prediction), and to epidemic modeling and forecasting.

== Awards and honors ==
- COPSS Presidents' Award (2023)
- Mortimer Spiegelman Award (2022).
- Fellow, Institute of Mathematical Statistics (2022).
- AAPOR Policy Impact Award (2022) and Warren J. Mitofsky Innovators Award (2022), as part of the COVID-19 Trends and Impact Survey Team (Delphi/UMD/Meta) team.
- ASA Statistical Partnerships Among Academe, Industry, and Government (SPAIG) Award (2021), with the Delphi COVIDcast Team.
- Carnegie Mellon University Teaching Innovation Award (2017).
- NSF CAREER Award (2016).

== Personal life ==
Ryan Tibshirani is the son of statistician Robert Tibshirani, with older brother Charlie Tibshirani, and younger sister Julie Tibshirani who is a co-creator generalized random forests. He is married to Jessica Tibshirani (née Issler) and they have two children.

== Selected publications ==
- Tibshirani, Ryan J.; Taylor, Jonathan (2011). "The solution path of the generalized lasso". Annals of Statistics. 39 (3): 1335–1371. arXiv:1005.1971. doi:10.1214/11-AOS878.
- Tibshirani, Ryan J. (2014). "Adaptive piecewise polynomial estimation via trend filtering". Annals of Statistics. 42 (1): 285–323. arXiv:1304.2986. doi:10.1214/13-AOS1189.
- Lockhart, Richard; Taylor, Jonathan; Tibshirani, Ryan J.; Tibshirani, Robert (2014). "The solution path of the generalized lasso". Annals of Statistics. 42 (2): 413–468. arXiv:1005.1971. doi:10.1214/11-AOS878.
- Wang, Yu-Xiang; Smola, Alex J.; Tibshirani, Ryan J. (2016). "Trend filtering on graphs". Journal of Machine Learning Research. 17 (105): 1–41.
- Lei, Jing; G'Sell, Max; Rinaldo, Alessandro; Tibshirani, Ryan J.; Wasserman, Larry (2018). "Distribution-free predictive inference for regression". Journal of the American Statistical Association. 113 (523): 1094–1111. arXiv:1604.04173. doi:10.1080/01621459.2017.1307116.
- Barber, Rina Foygel; Candès, Emmanuel J.; Ramdas, Aaditya; Tibshirani, Ryan J. (2023). "Conformal prediction beyond exchangeability". Annals of Statistics. 51 (2): 816–845. arXiv:2202.13415. doi:10.1214/23-AOS2276.
