= Tianxi Cai =

Chinese biostatistician

- 蔡天西
- Education: University of Science and Technology of China (BS); Harvard University (DSc)
- Scientific career
- Fields: Biostatistics
- Institutions: University of Washington; Harvard University
- Thesis: Correlated Survival (1999)
- Doctoral advisor: Lee-Jen Wei
- Doctoral students: Layla Parast
- Website: https://www.hsph.harvard.edu/tianxi-cai/

Tianxi Cai (Chinese: 蔡天西) is a Chinese biostatistician. She is the John Rock Professor of Population and Translational Data Sciences in the Department of Biostatistics at the Harvard T.H. Chan School of Public Health. Topics in her research include biomarkers, personalized medicine, survival analysis, and health informatics.

== Education and career ==
Cai graduated from the University of Science and Technology of China in 1995, with a bachelor's degree in mathematics. She earned her doctorate (Sc.D.) in biostatistics at Harvard University in 1999. Her dissertation, Correlated Survival, was supervised by Lee-Jen Wei.

She worked as an assistant professor of biostatistics at the University of Washington from 2000 to 2002, before returning to Harvard as a faculty member.

== Recognition ==
Cai was named a Fellow of the American Statistical Association in 2011. In 2025, she was named a Fellow of the Institute of Mathematical Statistics.

== Personal ==
Cai is the daughter of Xiaowan Cai and sister of T. Tony Cai, also a statistician.
