= Ross Prentice =

Canadian-born statistician

Ross L. Prentice
- Born: October 16, 1946 (age 79); Epsom, Ontario, Canada
- Education: University of Waterloo; University of Toronto
- Awards: COPSS Presidents' Award (1986); R. A. Fisher Lectureship (2008)
- Scientific career
- Fields: Biostatistics, epidemiology
- Institutions: Fred Hutchinson Cancer Research Center; University of Waterloo
- Thesis: Dilution, bio-assay, discrete reaction, and the structural model (1970)
- Doctoral advisor: Donald A. S. Fraser
- Doctoral students: Jianwen Cai; Sharon Xiangwen Xie

Ross Laverne Prentice (born October 16, 1946) is a Canadian statistician known particularly for his contributions to survival analysis and statistical methods for epidemiology. Since 1974, he has worked at the Fred Hutchinson Cancer Research Center and is also a professor of biostatistics at the University of Washington School of Public Health.

== Education and career ==
Prentice studied mathematics at the University of Waterloo from where he graduated in 1967, then obtained an MSc and PhD in statistics from the University of Toronto. He taught at the University of Waterloo before moving to the Fred Hutchinson Cancer Research Center in 1974.

Prentice proposed the case-cohort design in 1986. His most cited statistical paper, published in 1989, concerns a criterion for the valid use of surrogate endpoints. He was one of the leaders of the Clinical Coordinating Center of the Women's Health Initiative from its beginning in 1993.

== Honors and awards ==
Prentice received the COPSS Presidents' Award in 1986 and the R. A. Fisher Lectureship in 2008, for which the citation read:

For fundamental contributions to the theory and practice of statistical science; for his influential and innovative research in the areas of survival analysis, life history processes, case-control and cohort studies; and for his influential role in the conception, design, and implementation of the Women's Health Initiative.

== Books ==
- John D. Kalbfleisch; Ross L. Prentice (1980). The Statistical Analysis of Failure Time Data. John Wiley & Sons. ISBN 9780471055198.
- Ross L. Prentice; Shanshan Zhao (2019). The Statistical Analysis of Multivariate Failure Time Data: A Marginal Modeling Approach. Chapman & Hall. ISBN 9781482256574.
