= Basilio de Bragança Pereira =

Brazilian statistician

Basílio de Bragança Pereira (born 29 April 1945) is a Brazilian statistician.

De Bragança Pereira studied at Escola Nacional de Ciências Estatísticas since 1958 until his Bachelor of Science in statistics (1968), and obtained his PhD and D.I.C. from the Imperial College of Science, Technology and Medicine (1976) supervised by Sir David Cox. He also obtained a Master of Science in operational research (1970) and a docent free in applied statistics (1989) from Universidade Federal do Rio de Janeiro.

In 2003 he spent a year working on a project on neural networks in statistics with Professor C.R. Rao at Penn State University on a postdoctoral grant from the Brazilian government (CAPES).

De Bragança Pereira is professor emeritus of the Universidade Federal do Rio de Janeiro where he has worked since 1970, in the Institute of Mathematics, Postgraduate School of Engineering and School of Medicine, associate professor at the Institute of Mathematics (1970–1989 and 1994–1997), research professor at COPPE (1970–present), titular professor of applied statistics at COPPE (1989–1994, retired), titular professor of biostatistics at the School of Medicine (1998–2015, retired). He has supervised more than 80 theses and dissertations.

De Bragança Pereira was elected member of the International Statistical Institute. His current statistical interests are applications of statistical learning methods in medicine, acting mainly in choice of separated models, likelihood and Bayesian inference, time series, regression and survival analysis, neural networks in statistics.

== Books ==
+ PEREIRA, B. de B,;RAO Calyampudi Radhakrishna; Oliveira, F.B.; Statistical Learning Using Neural Networks:A Guide for Statisticians and Data Scientists with Python, Champman Hall-CRC Press, Lomdon, 2020

- PEREIRA, B. de B.; PEREIRA, C. A. de B. Model Choice in Nonnested Families, Springer, London, 2016.
- SANTOS, A. M.; PEREIRA, B de B. Modelos Gráficos e Aplicações. 56a RBRAS e 14o SEAGRO, Maringa, 2011, 56p * PEREIRA, B. de B.; RAO Calyampudi Radhakrishna, Data Mining Using Neural Networks: A Guide for Statisticians]. State College, Pennsylvania, 2009. 186 p.
- PEREIRA, B. de B.; RODRIGUES, C V C . Redes Neurais em Estatística]. Rio de Janeiro:, 1998. v. 1. 144 p. Associação Brasileira de Estatística
- PEREIRA, B. de B.; SANT'ANNA, A. P. . Análise Econométrica de Séries Temporais. Rio de Janeiro:, 1989. 343 p. IM/UFRJ
- SALES, P. R. H.; PEREIRA, B. de B.; VIEIRA, A. M. . Identificação e Estimação Recursiva de Modelos de Séries Temporais Uni e Multivariadas]. Rio de Janeiro: 1989. 60 p. 3a ESTE, Rio de Janeiro.
- PEREIRA, B. de B.; PAIS, M. B. Z.; SALES, P. R. H. . Análise Espectral de Séries Temporais: Uma Introdução para Engenharia, Economia e Estatística]. Rio de Janeiro: 1986. 109 p. Arte Final e Eletrobrás
- PEREIRA, B. de B. . Séries Temporais Multivariadas]., 1984. 219 p. Associação Brasileira de Estatística
- PEREIRA, B. de B. Tópicos em Séries Temporais: Métodos Automáticos de Previsão]. PDD 07/80 COPPE/UFRJ. Rio de Janeiro, 1980
