= Point Processes =

1980 mathematics book by Cox and Isham

- Author: David Cox, Valerie Isham
- Genre: Mathematics
- Publisher: Chapman & Hall
- Publication date: 1980

Point Processes is a book on the mathematics of point processes, randomly located sets of points on the real line or in other geometric spaces. It was written by David Cox and Valerie Isham, and published in 1980 by Chapman & Hall in their Monographs on Applied Probability and Statistics book series. The Basic Library List Committee of the Mathematical Association of America has suggested its inclusion in undergraduate mathematics libraries.

== Topics ==
Although Point Processes covers some of the general theory of point processes, that is not its main focus, and it avoids any discussion of statistical inference involving these processes. Instead, its aim is to present the properties and descriptions of several specific processes arising in applications of this theory, which had not been previously collected in texts in this area.

Three of its six chapters concern more general material, while the final three are more specific. The first chapter includes introductory material on standard processes: Poisson point processes, renewal processes, self-exciting processes, and doubly stochastic processes. The second chapter provides some general theory including stationarity, orderliness (meaning that the probability of multiple arrivals in short intervals is sublinear in the interval length), Palm distributions, Fourier analysis, and probability-generating functions. Chapter four (the third of the more general chapters) concerns point process operations, methods of modifying or combining point processes to generate other processes.

Chapter three, the first of the three chapters on more specific models, is titled "Special models". The special models that it covers include non-stationary Poisson processes, compound Poisson processes, and the Moran process, along with additional treatment of doubly stochastic processes and renewal processes. Until this point, the book focuses on point processes on the real line (possibly also with a time dimension), but the two final chapters concern multivariate processes and on point processes for higher dimensional spaces, including spatio-temporal processes and Gibbs point processes.

== Audience and reception ==
The book is primarily a reference for researchers. It could also be used to provide additional examples for a course on stochastic processes, or as the basis for an advanced seminar. Although it uses relatively little advanced mathematics, readers are expected to understand advanced calculus and have some familiarity with probability theory and Markov chains.

Writing some ten years after its original publication, reviewer Fergus Daly of The Open University writes that his copy has been well used, and that it "still is a very good book: lucid, relevant and still not matched in its approach by any other text".
