= Genevera Allen =

American statistician

Genevera Irene Allen is an American statistician whose research has involved interpretable machine learning, the reproducibility of machine learning results, and the neuroscience of synesthesia. She is an associate professor of electrical and computer engineering, statistics, and computer science at Rice University, and also holds affiliations with Texas Children's Hospital and the Baylor College of Medicine.

== Education and career ==
Allen is originally from rural North Carolina, and as a high school student focused on playing the viola, but switched to statistics after a shoulder injury as a college freshman. She is a 2006 graduate of Rice University. She went to Stanford University for graduate study in statistics, and completed her PhD in 2010. Her dissertation, Transposable Regularized Covariance Models with Applications To High-dimensional Data, was supervised by Robert Tibshirani.

She returned to Rice University and the Baylor College of Medicine in 2010 as an assistant professor. Rice gave her the Dobelman Family Junior Chair from 2013 to 2017. She was named an associate professor in 2017, and became founding director of the Center for Transforming Data to Knowledge (Data to Knowledge Lab) in 2018.

== Recognition ==
Allen became an Elected Member of the International Statistical Institute in 2021. She was named as a Fellow of the American Statistical Association in 2022.
