= Jane Hutton =

British medical statistician

Jane Luise Hutton is a British medical statistician. Her research interests include meta-analysis, survival analysis, and ethics in mathematics, and she has participated in highly-cited studies on autism and cerebral palsy. She is a professor of statistics at the University of Warwick. She also frequently visits the African Institute for Mathematical Sciences in South Africa as a volunteer statistics instructor.

== Education and career ==
Hutton read mathematics and statistics at the University of Edinburgh, earning a bachelor's degree with first class honours in 1982. After studying for a diploma in mathematical statistics at the University of Cambridge, she earned a PhD at Imperial College London in 1986. Her dissertation, Non-negative time series and shot noise processes as models for dry rivers, was supervised by David Cox.

She worked at the University of Liverpool from 1986 to 1995 and at Newcastle University from 1996 to 2000, before moving to the University of Warwick in 2000.

=== USS director ===
Hutton became a director of the Universities Superannuation Scheme on 1 November 2015. On 21 May 2019, it was revealed that, in her capacity as a non-executive director on the USS board of trustees, she had in March 2018 complained to the Pensions Regulator, alleging that her efforts in 2017 to check whether the USS deficit had been miscalculated had been frustrated by delays and obstructions to providing her with data to which she needed access to fulfil her fiduciary duties. As of May 2019, the Pensions Regulator and Financial Reporting Council were investigating the allegations. On 14 June 2019, as the investigation continued, the Regulator rebuked USS for claiming that aspects of USS policy were mandated by the Regulator when in fact they were not.

Hutton was suspended from USS's board in June 2019. On 11 October 2019, it was reported that she had been dismissed as a director of USS on the grounds that, according to an independent investigation by Slaughter and May, "she had breached a number of her director's duties owed under company law and contract". USS said that the dismissal was independent of Hutton's whistleblowing and the ongoing investigation; Hutton said she did not view the decision as valid and was considering further action. Information about Hutton's dismissal was leaked on 22 February 2020. On 9 March 2020 Hutton gave an extensive interview to Portfolio Institutional.

Following her dismissal, Hutton commenced proceedings at an employment tribunal, arguing that she had been unfairly dismissed. The tribunal commenced on 17 May 2022, but Hutton unilaterally withdrew her case on 19 May.

== Recognition ==
Hutton won a Royal Society Wolfson Research Merit Award in 2013. She won the 2016 Suffrage Science Maths and Computing Award of the Medical Research Council. The International Biometric Society gave her their Rob Kempton Award in 2016, "for outstanding contributions to the development of biometry in the developing world". She is an elected member of the International Statistical Institute. In 2019 she was commended by the judges of the John Maddox Prize for her transparency in respect of the USS Pensions.
