= COPSS Presidents' Award =

Statistics award

The COPSS Presidents' Award is given annually by the Committee of Presidents of Statistical Societies to a young statistician in recognition of outstanding contributions to the profession of statistics. The COPSS Presidents' Award is generally regarded as one of the highest honours in the field of statistics, along with the International Prize in Statistics.

Specifically, eligible candidates either i) will be under age 41 throughout the award calendar year, or ii) will be under age 46 throughout the award calendar year and will have received a terminal statistically-related degree no more than 12 years prior to that year. For example, an individual eligible for 2016 nomination under (ii) must have been born in 1971 or later with terminal statistically-related degree dated 2004 or later. Prior to 2005 the award was given to a statistician not yet having reached their 41st birthday during the calendar year of the award.

The COPSS Presidents' Award is awarded by the five sponsoring statistical societies:

- The American Statistical Association (ASA)
- The Statistical Society of Canada (SSC)
- The Institute of Mathematical Statistics (IMS)
- The Eastern North American Region of the International Biometric Society (ENAR)
- The Western North American Region of the International Biometric Society (WNAR)

The presentation of the award takes place at the annual Joint Statistical Meetings (JSM).

== Winners of the COPSS Presidents' Award ==
- 1981: Peter J. Bickel, University of California, Berkeley
- 1982: Stephen Fienberg, Carnegie Mellon University
- 1983: Tze Leung Lai, Stanford University
- 1984: David V. Hinkley, University of California, Santa Barbara
- 1985: James O. Berger, Duke University
- 1986: Ross L. Prentice, Fred Hutchinson Cancer Research Center
- 1987: C. F. Jeff Wu, Georgia Institute of Technology
- 1988: Raymond J. Carroll, Texas A&M University
- 1989: Peter Hall, Australian National University
- 1990: Peter McCullagh, University of Chicago
- 1991: Bernard Silverman, University of Oxford
- 1992: Nancy Reid, University of Toronto
- 1993: Wing Hung Wong, Stanford University
- 1994: David L. Donoho, Stanford University
- 1995: Iain M. Johnstone, Stanford University
- 1996: Robert J. Tibshirani, Stanford University
- 1997: Kathryn Roeder, Carnegie Mellon University
- 1998: Pascal Massart, Université de Paris-Sud
- 1999: Larry A. Wasserman, Carnegie Mellon University
- 2000: Jianqing Fan, Princeton University
- 2001: Xiao-Li Meng, Harvard University
- 2002: Jun Liu, Harvard University
- 2003: Andrew Gelman, Columbia University
- 2004: Michael A. Newton, University of Wisconsin
- 2005: Mark J. van der Laan, University of California, Berkeley
- 2006: Xihong Lin, Harvard University
- 2007: Jeff Rosenthal, University of Toronto
- 2008: T. Tony Cai, University of Pennsylvania
- 2009: Rafael Irizarry, Harvard University
- 2010: David Dunson, Duke University
- 2011: Nilanjan Chatterjee, Johns Hopkins University
- 2012: Samuel Kou, Harvard University
- 2013: Marc A. Suchard, UCLA
- 2014: Martin J. Wainwright, University of California, Berkeley
- 2015: John D. Storey, Princeton University
- 2016: Nicolai Meinshausen, ETH Zürich
- 2017: Tyler J. VanderWeele, Harvard University
- 2018: Richard J. Samworth, University of Cambridge
- 2019: Hadley Wickham, RStudio, Inc.
- 2020: Rina Foygel Barber, University of Chicago
- 2021: Jeffrey T. Leek, Fred Hutchinson Cancer Center
- 2022: Daniela Witten, University of Washington
- 2023: Ryan Tibshirani, University of California, Berkeley
- 2024: Veronika Ročková, University of Chicago
- 2025: Lester Mackey, Microsoft Research
- 2026: Weijie Su, University of Pennsylvania

Note: Listed are recipients' current working institutions not when awarded COPSS.

Peter J. Bickel, Stephen Fienberg, James O. Berger, Ross L. Prentice, C. F. Jeff Wu, Raymond J. Carroll, Kathryn Roeder, Wing Hung Wong are also R. A. Fisher Lecturers.

== See also ==
- List of mathematics awards
- Rousseeuw Prize for Statistics
- COPSS Distinguished Achievement Award and Lectureship
