= Harvard Data Science Review =

Peer-reviewed scientific journal

- Discipline: Data science
- Language: English
- Edited by: Xiao-Li Meng

Publication details
- History: Since 2019
- Publisher: MIT Press
- Frequency: Quarterly
- Open access: Yes
- License: CC-BY 4.0
- Impact factor: 2.5 (2024)

Standard abbreviations
- ISO 4: Harv. Data Sci. Rev.

Indexing
- ISSN: 2688-8513 (print); 2644-2353 (web)
- OCLC no.: 1104328966

Links
- Journal homepage

The Harvard Data Science Review is a quarterly peer-reviewed open-access scientific journal about data science. It was established in 2019 by the Harvard Data Science Initiative. The journal is published by MIT Press and the founding and current editor-in-chief is Xiao-Li Meng.

== Reception ==
The journal won the 2021 Professional and Scholarly Excellence Award for best new journal in science, technology, and medicine from the Association of American Publishers. According to the Journal Citation Reports, the journal has a 2024 impact factor of 2.5.
