= Layla Parast =

American biostatistician

Layla Mosama Parast Bartroff is an American biostatistician whose research involves surrogate markers, predictive modelling, survival analysis, causal inference, and health care quality. Formerly a senior statistician and co-director of the Center for Causal Inference at the RAND Corporation, she is an associate professor of statistics and data sciences at the University of Texas at Austin. She is also a frequent newspaper and news magazine editorial writer on issues related to public health, supported as a Public Voices Fellow of The OpEd Project.

== Early life and education ==
Parast grew up in Texas, as the daughter of two academics: her mother, Ann Roberts Parast, is a retired English professor at Texas State Technical College, and her father, Rudy M. Parast, is a mathematician affiliated with the Marine Military Academy. After undergraduate studies at the University of Texas at Austin, Parast earned a master's degree in statistics at Stanford University.

Her interest in biostatistics began with an epidemiology course taken during her master's program at Stanford. She completed a Ph.D. in biostatistics at Harvard University in 2012. Her dissertation, Landmark Prediction of Survival, was supervised by Tianxi Cai.

== Career ==
After working at the RAND Corporation as a senior statistician and co-director of the Center for Causal Inference, Parast returned to the University of Texas at Austin as a faculty member, joining the Department of Statistics and Data Sciences as an associate professor in 2022. Her husband, Jay Bartroff, joined the same department at the same time, moving there from the University of Southern California.

== Recognition ==
Parast was named as a Fellow of the American Statistical Association, in the 2023 class of fellows.
