= Claudia Klüppelberg =

German mathematician (born 1953)

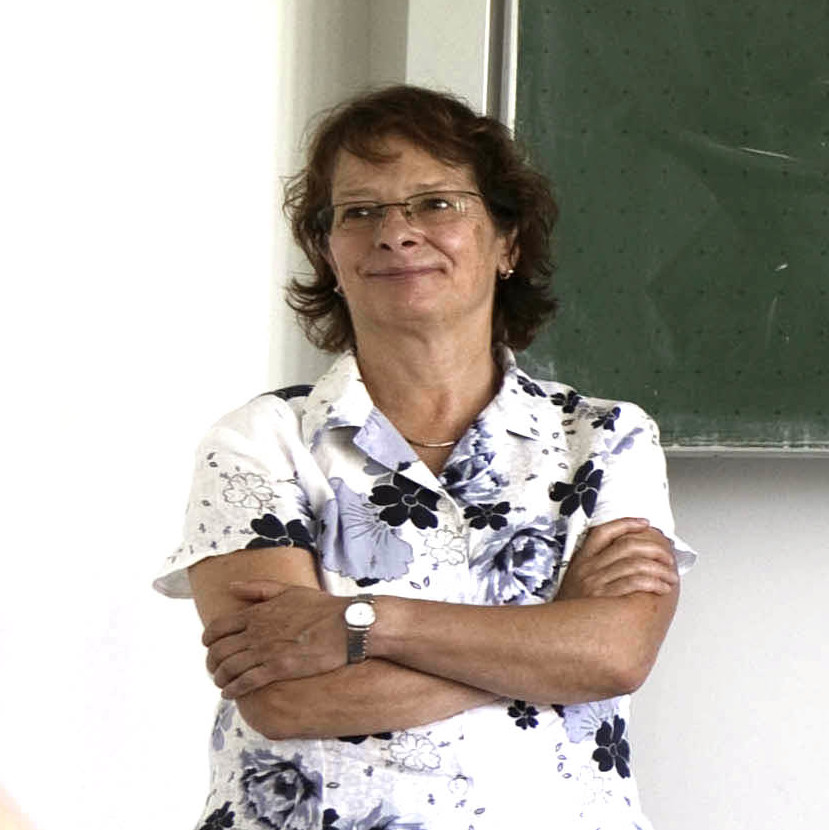
- Klüppelberg in 2010
- Born: May 23, 1953 (age 73)
- Education: University of Mannheim
- Scientific career
- Fields: Mathematics, Statistics
- Workplaces: University of Mainz; Technical University of Munich
- Thesis: Subexponentielle Verteilungen und Charakterisierungen verwandter Klassen (1987)
- Doctoral advisor: Horand Störmer; Paul Embrechts

Claudia Klüppelberg (born May 23, 1953) is a German mathematical statistician and applied probability theorist, known for her work in risk assessment and statistical finance. She is a professor emerita of mathematical statistics at the Technical University of Munich.

== Education and career ==
Klüppelberg completed a doctorate in 1987 at the University of Mannheim. Her dissertation, Subexponentielle Verteilungen und Charakterisierungen verwandter Klassen, was jointly supervised by Horand Störmer and Paul Embrechts.

She earned her habilitation in 1993 at ETH Zurich. Then, she became a professor of applied statistics at Johannes Gutenberg University Mainz, and moved to the Technical University of Munich in 1997. She retired to become a professor emerita in 2019.

== Books ==
Klüppelberg is the co-author of

- Modelling Extremal Events: for Insurance and Finance (with Paul Embrechts and Thomas Mikosch, Springer, 1997)

She is the co-editor of

- Complex Stochastic Systems (edited with Ole Barndorff-Nielsen and David R. Cox, Chapman & Hall/CRC, 2001)
- Risk - A Multidisciplinary Introduction (edited with Daniel Straub and Isabell M. Welpe, Springer, 2014)

== Recognition ==
Klüppelberg was awarded the Order of Merit of the Federal Republic of Germany and the Bavarian state order Pro meritis scientiae et litterarum in 2001. She is a Fellow of the Institute of Mathematical Statistics, and was a Medallion Lecturer of the Institute of Mathematical Statistics in 2009.
