= Adelchi Azzalini =

Italian statistician (born 1951)

Adelchi Azzalini (born 1951) is an Italian statistician and educator. He is known for research in likelihood inference and multivariate statistics including the development of skew normal distributions.

== Education and career ==
Azzalini was born in Milan and received his laurea in statistics and economics from the University of Padua in 1975. He carried out his military service for a year before working as a research assistant at the University of Padua. In 1978, Azzalini moved to the UK and studied at Imperial College London, where he received his MSc and PhD, both in statistics, in 1979 and 1981, respectively. His PhD supervisor was David Cox. Azzalini returned to Padua to take on a researcher position in 1981 and became a professor at the University of Padua in 1986 and remained there since.

Azzalini is a fellow of the Royal Statistical Society, a member of the Bernoulli Society for Mathematical Statistics and Probability and served as the editor of the Bernoulli News in 2000. In 2011, a workshop was held at the Pontifical Catholic University of Chile to honor Azzalini's contribution to the development of the skew-normal distribution.

== Bibliography ==
- Azzalini, Adelchi (1996). Statistical inference : based on the likelihood. London: Chapman & Hall. ISBN 0-412-60650-X. OCLC 35569040.
- Bowman, A. W.; Azzalini, Adelchi (1997). Applied smoothing techniques for data analysis : the kernel approach with S-Plus illustrations. Oxford: Clarendon Press. ISBN 0-585-48410-4. OCLC 53956470.
- Azzalini, Adelchi; Scarpa, Bruno (2012). Data Analysis and Data Mining : an Introduction. Oxford: Oxford University Press. ISBN 978-0-19-990928-5. OCLC 793996687.
- Azzalini, Adelchi; Capitanio, Antonella (2014). The skew-normal and related families. Cambridge: Cambridge University Press. ISBN 978-1-107-02927-9. OCLC 854541758.
