= Valerie Isham =

British mathematician

Valerie S. Isham
- Born: 1947 (age 78–79)
- Education: Imperial College London
- Awards: Guy Medal (Bronze, 1990)
- Scientific career
- Workplaces: University College London
- Doctoral advisor: David Cox

Valerie Susan Isham (born 1947) is a British applied probabilist and former President of the Royal Statistical Society. Isham's research interests in include point processes, spatial processes, spatio-temporal processes and population processes.

== Education and career ==
Isham went to Imperial College London (B.Sc., Ph.D.) where she was a student of statistician David Cox. She has been a professor of probability and statistics at University College London since 1992.

== Book ==
Isham is the coauthor with Cox of the book Point Processes (Chapman & Hall, 1980).

== Recognition ==
Isham was the president of the Royal Statistical Society for 2011–2012. She was awarded its Guy Medal in Bronze in 1990. In 2018 she received the Forder Lectureship from the London Mathematical Society and the New Zealand Mathematical Society.
