= Veronika Ročková =

Statistician

Veronika Ročková (born 1985) is a Bayesian statistician. Born in Czechoslovakia, and educated in the Czech Republic, Belgium, and the Netherlands, she works in the US as a professor of econometrics and statistics and James S. Kemper Faculty Scholar at the University of Chicago. Her research studies methods including variable selection, high-dimensional inference, non-convex optimization, likelihood-free inference, and the spike-and-slab LASSO, and also includes applications in biomedical statistics.

== Education and career ==
Ročková was born in 1985 in Pardubice, Czechoslovakia, now in the Czech Republic. She studied mathematics and statistics at Charles University in Prague, Hasselt University in Belgium, and Erasmus University Rotterdam in the Netherlands. She earned a bachelor's degree in mathematics from Charles University in 2007, a master's degree in biostatistics from Hasselt University in 2009, a second master's degree in mathematical statistics from Charles University in 2010, and a Ph.D. from Erasmus University in 2013. Her doctoral dissertation, Bayesian Variable Selection in High-dimensional Applications, was supervised by Emmanuel Lesaffre.

After postdoctoral research in the Wharton School of the University of Pennsylvania from 2013 to 2016, she became an assistant professor in econometrics and statistics and James S. Kemper Foundation Faculty Scholar at the University of Chicago in 2016. She was promoted to associate professor in 2020 and full professor in 2022.

== Recognition ==
Ročková was the 2018 Susie Bayarri Lecturer of the International Society for Bayesian Analysis. She was awarded a National Science Foundation CAREER Award in 2020. She was a recipient of the 2023 Emerging Leader Award and the recipient of the 2024 COPSS Presidents' Award of the Committee of Presidents of Statistical Societies, given "for path-breaking contributions to theory and methodology at the intersection of Bayesian and frequentist Statistics in the areas of variable selection, factor models, non-parametric Bayes, tree-based and deep-learning methods, high-dimensional inference, generative methods for Bayesian computation; for exemplary service to Statistics and for generous mentorship of students and post-doctoral researchers".
