= David Cox (statistician) =

British statistician and educator (1924–2022)

Sir David Cox FRS FBA FRSE FRSC
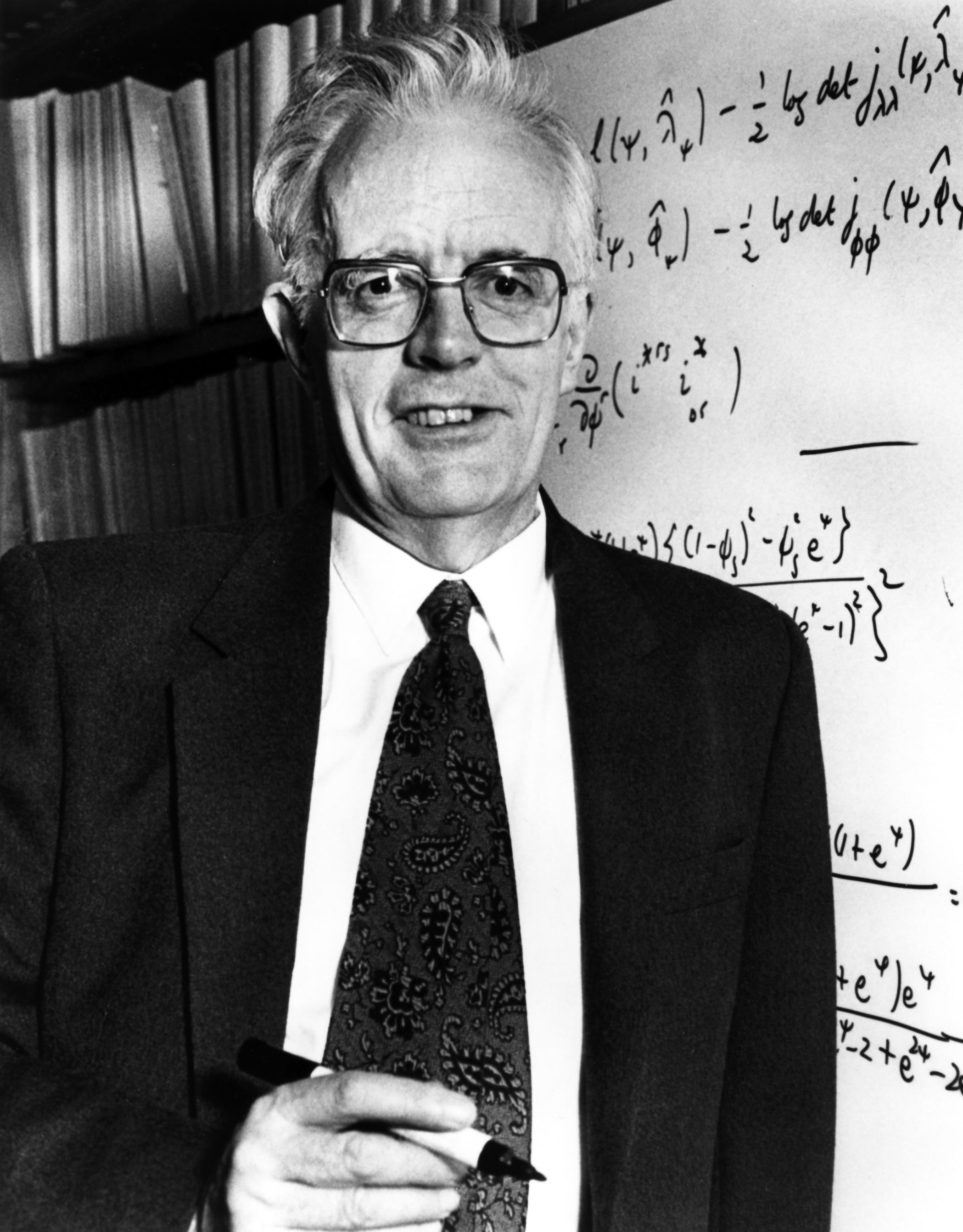
- Cox in 1980
- Born: 15 July 1924; Birmingham, England
- Died: 18 January 2022 (aged 97); Oxford, England
- Education: St John's College, Cambridge (MA); University of Leeds (PhD)
- Known for: Cox proportional hazards model; Cox process; Box-Cox transform; Matrix-exponential distribution; Method of supplementary variables; Stochastic processes; Design of experiments; Analysis of binary data
- Spouse: Joyce Drummond (m. 1947)
- Children: 4
- Awards: Knight Bachelor; Fellow of the Royal Society; Guy Medal (Silver, 1961) (Gold, 1973); George Box Medal (2005); Copley Medal (2010); International Prize in Statistics (2016); BBVA Foundation Frontiers of Knowledge Award (2016)
- Scientific career
- Fields: Statistics
- Workplaces: Royal Aircraft Establishment; Wool Industries Research Association; University of Cambridge; Birkbeck College, London; Imperial College London; Nuffield College, Oxford
- Thesis: Theory of Fibre Motion (1949)
- Doctoral advisor: Henry Daniels; Bernard Lewis Welch
- Doctoral students: David Hinkley; Peter McCullagh; Basilio de Bragança Pereira; Walter L. Smith; Gauss Moutinho Cordeiro; Adelchi Azzalini; Valerie Isham; Henry Wynn; Claudio Di Veroli; Jane Hutton
- Other notable students: Nancy Reid (postdoc)

Sir David Roxbee Cox FRS FBA FRSE FRSC (15 July 1924 – 18 January 2022) was a British statistician and educator. His wide-ranging contributions to the field of statistics included introducing logistic regression, the proportional hazards model and the Cox process, a point process named after him.

Cox was a professor of statistics at Birkbeck College, London, Imperial College London and the University of Oxford, and served as Warden of Nuffield College, Oxford. The first recipient of the International Prize in Statistics, he also received the Guy, George Box and Copley medals, as well as a knighthood.

== Early life ==
Cox was born in Birmingham on 15 July 1924. His father was a die sinker and part-owner of a jewellery shop, and they lived near the Jewellery Quarter. The aeronautical engineer Harold Roxbee Cox was a distant cousin. He attended Handsworth Grammar School, Birmingham. He received a Master of Arts in mathematics at St John's College, Cambridge, and obtained his PhD from the University of Leeds in 1949, advised by Henry Daniels and Bernard Welch. His dissertation was entitled Theory of Fibre Motion.

== Career ==
Cox was employed from 1944 to 1946 at the Royal Aircraft Establishment, from 1946 to 1950 at the Wool Industries Research Association in Leeds, and from 1950 to 1955 worked at the Statistical Laboratory at the University of Cambridge. From 1956 to 1966 he was Reader and then Professor of Statistics at Birkbeck College, London. In 1966, he took up the Chair position in Statistics at Imperial College London where he later became head of the mathematics department. In 1988 he became Warden of Nuffield College and a member of the Department of Statistics at Oxford University. He formally retired from these positions in 1994, but continued to work at Oxford.

Cox supervised, collaborated with, and encouraged many notable researchers prominent in statistics. He collaborated with George Box on a study of transformations such as the Box–Cox transformation and they were especially delighted to be credited as Box and Cox. He was the doctoral advisor of David Hinkley, Peter McCullagh, Basilio de Bragança Pereira, Wally Smith, Gauss Moutinho Cordeiro, Valerie Isham, Henry Wynn, Claudio Di Veroli and Jane Hutton. He served as president of the Bernoulli Society from 1979 to 1981, of the Royal Statistical Society from 1980 to 1982, and of the International Statistical Institute from 1995 to 1997. He was an Honorary Fellow of Nuffield College and St John's College, Cambridge, and was a member of the Department of Statistics at the University of Oxford.

== Personal life and death ==
In 1947, Cox married Joyce Drummond, and they had four children. He died at his home in Oxford, on 18 January 2022, at the age of 97. Cox is buried in Wolvercote cemetery.

== Research ==
Cox made pioneering and important contributions to numerous areas of statistics and applied probability, of which the best known are:

- Logistic regression, which is employed when the variable to be predicted is categorical (i.e., can take a limited number of values, e.g., gender, race (in the US census)), binary (a special case of categorical with only two values - e.g., success/failure, disease/no disease), or ordinal, where the categories can be ranked (e.g., pain intensity can be absent, mild, moderate, severe, unbearable). Cox's 1958 paper and further publications in the 1960s addressed the case of binary logistic regression.
- The proportional hazards model, which is widely used in the analysis of survival data, was developed by him in 1972. An example of the use of the proportional hazards model is in survival analysis in medical research. The model can be used in clinical trials to investigate time-based information about cohorts of patients, such as their response to exposure to certain chemical substances.
- The Cox process was named after him.

== Awards ==
Cox received numerous awards and honours for his work. He was awarded the Guy Medals in Silver (1961) and Gold (1973) of the Royal Statistical Society. He was elected Fellow of the Royal Society of London in 1973. The next year, he was elected to the American Academy of Arts and Sciences. He was knighted by Queen Elizabeth II in 1985. He was elected to the American Philosophical Society in 1990. Cox became an Honorary Fellow of the British Academy in 1997 and was a Fellow of the American Statistical Association. He was a Foreign Associate of the US National Academy of Sciences and a foreign member of the Royal Danish Academy of Sciences and Letters. In 1990, he won the Kettering Prize and Gold Medal for Cancer Research for "the development of the Proportional Hazard Regression Model." In 2010 he was awarded the Copley Medal of the Royal Society "for his seminal contributions to the theory and applications of statistics", the same year in which he was elected a foreign fellow of the Royal Society of Canada. He was also the first ever recipient of the International Prize in Statistics. He received the award in 2016. In 2013 Cox was elected an Honorary Fellow of the Royal Society of Edinburgh. In 2016, he won the BBVA Foundation Frontiers of Knowledge Award in the Basic Sciences category jointly with Bradley Efron, for the development of "pioneering and hugely influential" statistical methods that have proved indispensable for obtaining reliable results in a vast spectrum of disciplines from medicine to astrophysics, genomics or particle physics.

== Publications ==
Cox wrote or co-authored over 300 papers and books. From 1966 to 1991 he was the editor of Biometrika. His books are as follows:

- Planning of experiments (1958)
- Queues (Methuen, 1961). With Walter L. Smith
- Renewal Theory (Methuen, 1962).
- The theory of stochastic processes (1965). With Hilton David Miller
- Analysis of binary data (1969). With Joyce Snell
- Theoretical statistics (1974). With D. V. Hinkley
- Problems and Solutions in Theoretical Statistics (1978). With D. V. Hinkley
- Point Processes (Chapman & Hall/CRC, 1980). With Valerie Isham
- Applied statistics, principles and examples (Chapman & Hall/CRC, 1981). With Joyce Snell
- Analysis of survival data (Chapman & Hall/CRC, 1984). With David Oakes
- Asymptotic techniques for use in statistics. (1989) With Ole E. Barndorff-Nielsen
- Inference and asymptotics (Chapman & Hall/CRC, 1994). With Ole E. Barndorff-Nielsen
- Multivariate dependencies: models, analysis and interpretation (Chapman & Hall, 1995). With Nanny Wermuth
- The theory of design of experiments. (Chapman & Hall/CRC, 2000). With Nancy M. Reid
- Complex stochastic systems (Chapman & Hall/CRC, 2000). With Ole E. Barndorff-Nielsen and Claudia Klüppelberg
- Components of variance (Chapman & Hall/CRC, 2003). With P. J. Solomon
- Principles of Statistical Inference (Cambridge University Press, 2006). ISBN 978-0-521-68567-2
- Selected Statistical Papers of Sir David Cox 2 Volume Set
- Principles of Applied Statistics (CUP). With Christl Donnelly

He was named editor of the following books:

- D. R. Cox; D. M. Titterington, eds. (1991). Complex Stochastic Systems. Royal Society. ISBN 978-0-85403-453-6.
- D. R. Cox, ed. (1992). The Collected Works of John W. Tukey: Factorial and ANOVA. Vol. VII. Taylor & Francis. ISBN 978-0-412-06321-3.
- D. R. Cox; D. V. Hinkley; Ole E. Barndorff-Nielsen, eds. (1996). Time series models in econometrics, finance and others. Taylor & Francis. ISBN 978-0-412-72930-0.
- D. M. Titterington; D. R. Cox, eds. (2001). Biometrika: One Hundred Years. Oxford University Press. ISBN 978-0-19-850993-6.

The following book was published in his honour:

- Celebrating Statistics: Papers in honour of Sir David Cox on his 80th birthday ISBN 978-0-19-856654-0

== See also ==
- Logrank test

Academic offices
Preceded by Michael Brock	Warden of Nuffield College, Oxford; 1988–1994	Succeeded by Sir Anthony Atkinson
