= Jianwen Cai =

Chinese-American biostatistician

Jianwen Cai is a Chinese and American biostatistician, the Cary C. Boshamer Distinguished Professor in the Department of Biostatistics in the UNC Gillings School of Global Public Health at the University of North Carolina at Chapel Hill. As well as statistical collaborations on observational studies and in epidemiology, her publications include fundamental research on recurrent event analysis.

== Education and career ==
Cai majored in mathematics at Shandong University, graduating in 1985. She continued her studies in biostatistics at the University of Washington, where she received a master's degree in 1989 and completed her Ph.D. in 1992. Her doctoral dissertation, Generalized Estimating Equations for Censored Multivariate Failure Time Data, was supervised by Ross Prentice.

After postdoctoral research at the Fred Hutchinson Cancer Research Center from 1990 to 1992, she joined the University of North Carolina as an assistant professor in 1992. She was promoted to associate professor in 1999 and to full professor in 2004. In 2015, she was named as the Cary C. Boshamer Distinguished Professor.

She has also served as president of the Eastern North America Region of the International Biometric Society, and as chair of the Biometrics and Lifetime Data Science Sections of the American Statistical Association.

== Recognition ==
Cai is a Fellow of the Institute of Mathematical Statistics. She was elected as a Fellow of the American Statistical Association in 2005.

The Gillings School of Global Public Health gave her their 2004 McGavran Award for Excellence in Teaching and their 2025 John E. Larsh Jr. Award for Mentorship.
