= Xiao-Li Meng =

Chinese American statistician (born 1963)

- 孟晓犁
- Born: 1963 (age 62–63)
- Occupations: Statistician; professor
- Title: Whipple V. N. Jones Professor of Statistics
- Awards: COPSS Presidents' Award (2001)

Academic background
- Education: Fudan University (B.Sc.); Harvard University (Ph.D.)
- Thesis: Towards Complete Results for Some Incomplete-Data Problems (1990)
- Doctoral advisor: Donald Rubin
- Website: https://statistics.fas.harvard.edu/people/xiao-li-meng

Xiao-Li Meng (Chinese: 孟晓犁; born 1963) is a Chinese American statistician and the Whipple V. N. Jones Professor of Statistics at Harvard University. He has written numerous research papers about Markov chain Monte Carlo algorithms and other statistical methodology.

== Early life ==
Meng received his B.Sc. from Fudan University in 1982 and his Ph.D. in statistics from Harvard University in 1990.

== Career ==
From 2004 to 2012, Meng was the Chair of Harvard's Department of Statistics, where he helped create innovative new statistics courses designed to give students a more positive impression of the subject. He edited the journals Bayesian Analysis from 2003 to 2005 and Statistica Sinica from 2005 to 2008. On August 14, 2012, Xiao-Li Meng was appointed dean of Harvard Graduate School of Arts and Sciences. Since its inception in 2019, he has been the editor of the Harvard Data Science Review.

== Selected publications ==
- Meng, Xiao-Li (2023). "When You Were a Student at Harvard, Did You Dream of Becoming a Dean?". In Honggang Yang; Wenying Xu (eds.). The Rise of Chinese American Leaders in U.S. Higher Education: Stories and Roadmaps. Cham: Springer Nature Switzerland. doi:10.1007/978-3-031-42379-6_17. ISBN 978-3-031-42378-9.

== Awards and honors ==
He received the COPSS Presidents' Award in 2001.

He was elected a fellow of the Institute of Mathematical Statistics in 1997 and of the American Statistical Association in 2004. He was elected fellow of the American Academy of Arts and Sciences (AAAS) in 2020. In 2013 he was recipient of the American Statistical Association's Founders Award.
