= Lawrence D. Brown =

American statistician

Lawrence David Brown
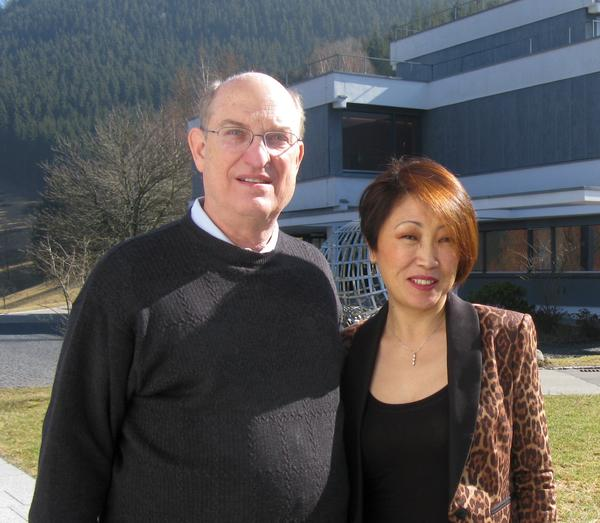
- Lawrence D. Brown with Linda Zhao
- Born: December 16, 1940; Los Angeles, US
- Died: February 21, 2018 (aged 77); Philadelphia, US
- Education: Cornell University; California Institute of Technology
- Spouse: Linda Zhao
- Scientific career
- Fields: Statistics
- Workplaces: University of California at Berkeley; Cornell University; Rutgers University; University of Pennsylvania
- Doctoral advisor: Jack Kiefer
- Doctoral students: Jim Berger; T. Tony Cai; Iain M. Johnstone; Constantine Gatsonis

Lawrence David (Larry) Brown (16 December 1940 – 21 February 2018) was Miers Busch Professor and Professor of Statistics at the Wharton School of the University of Pennsylvania in Philadelphia, Pennsylvania. He is known for his groundbreaking work in a broad range of fields including decision theory, recurrence and partial differential equations, nonparametric function estimation, minimax and adaptation theory, and the analysis of census data and call-center data.

== Career ==
Brown was educated at the California Institute of Technology and Cornell University, where he earned his Ph.D. in 1964. He earned numerous honors, including election to the United States National Academy of Sciences, and published widely, beginning with his Ph.D. research, which made major advances in admissibility. He was president of the Institute of Mathematical Statistics in 1992–93. He was elected to the American Academy of Arts and Sciences in 2013.

After having been assistant professor at University of California at Berkeley, associate professor at Cornell University – with the latter move entailing a change from a statistics to a mathematics department, allowing him to avoid being drafted for the Vietnam War – and professor at Cornell University and Rutgers University, he was invited to join the Department of Statistics at the Wharton School of the University of Pennsylvania.

== Personal life ==
Brown was born in Los Angeles to parents Louis M. Brown and Hermione Brown. He was married to Linda Zhao, a fellow statistician at the Wharton School.

== Honors and awards ==
- Member, American Academy of Arts and Sciences
- Member, National Academy of Sciences
- Fellow of the American Statistical Association (A.S.A)
- Fellow of the Institute of Mathematical Statistics (I.M.S.)
- Wald Lecturer, Institute of Mathematical Statistics, August 1985;
- Lady Davis Professorship, Hebrew University, 1988
- Doctor of Science (Honorary), Purdue University, 1993
- Wilks Award of the American Statistical Association, 2002
- C.R. and B. Rao Prize, 2007
- The Provost's Award for Distinguished Ph.D. Teaching and Mentoring, University of Pennsylvania, 2011

=== In his honor ===
- Institute of Mathematical Statistics Lawrence D. Brown Ph.D. Student Award

== Selected publications ==
=== Books ===
- 1985. (with Olkin, I., Sacks, J., and Wynn, H.P.) Jack Carl Kiefer Collected Papers, 3 vols., Springer-Verlag, New York.
- 1986. (with Olkin, I., Sacks, J., and Wynn, H.P.) Jack Carl Kiefer Collected Papers Supplementary Volume, Springer-Verlag, New York.
- 1986. Fundamentals of Statistical Exponential Families with Applications in Statistical Decision Theory, Inst. of Math. Statist., Hayward, California.
- 2005. (with Plewes, T.J., and Gerstein, M.A.) Measuring Research and Development in the United States Economy, National Academies Press.
- 2010. (with Michael L. Cohen, Daniel L. Cork, and Constance F. Citro) Envisioning the 2020 Census. Panel on the Design of the 2020 Census Program of Evaluations and Experiments, Committee on National Statistics, Division of Behavioral and Social Sciences and Education. Washington, DC: National Academies Press.
