= Peter McCullagh =

Irish statistician (born 1952)

- Born: 8 January 1952 (age 74); Northern Ireland
- Education: University of Birmingham; Imperial College London (PhD)
- Known for: McCullagh's parametrization of the Cauchy distributions
- Awards: Guy Medal (bronze, 1983) (silver, 2005) (gold, 2026); COPSS Presidents' Award (1990); Fellow of the Royal Society (1994)
- Scientific career
- Fields: Statistics
- Workplaces: University of Chicago
- Thesis: Analysis of Ordered Categorical Data (1977)
- Doctoral advisor: Anthony C. Atkinson; David Roxbee Cox
- Doctoral students: Gauss Cordeiro
- Website: www.stat.uchicago.edu/~pmcc

Peter McCullagh FRS (born 8 January 1952) is a Northern Irish-born American statistician and John D. MacArthur Distinguished Service Professor in the Department of Statistics at the University of Chicago.

== Education ==
McCullagh is from Plumbridge, Northern Ireland. He attended St Columb's College Derry (1963-1970), studied mathematics at the University of Birmingham and completed his PhD at Imperial College London in 1977, supervised by David Cox and Anthony Atkinson.

== Research ==
McCullagh is the coauthor with John Nelder of Generalized Linear Models (1983, Chapman and Hall – second edition 1989), a seminal text on the subject of generalized linear models (GLMs) with more than 23,000 citations. He also wrote "Tensor Methods in Statistics", published in 1987, and "Ten Projects in Applied Statistics" Springer, 2023.

== Awards and honours ==
McCullagh is a Fellow of the Royal Society and the American Academy of Arts and Sciences. He won the COPSS Presidents' Award in 1990. He was the recipient of the Royal Statistical Society's Guy Medal in Bronze in 1983, Silver in 2005 and Gold in 2026.

He was also the recipient of the inaugural Karl Pearson Prize of the International Statistical Institute, with John Nelder, "for their monograph Generalized Linear Models (1983)". He won a Notable Alumni Award in 2007 from his grammar school, St Columb's College.
