= David Hinkley =

American mathematician (1945–2019)

- Born: David Victor Hinkley; 10 September 1944; Kent, England
- Died: 11 January 2019 (aged 74); Santa Barbara, California, U.S.
- Education: University of Birmingham; University of London (PhD)
- Known for: bootstrapping
- Spouse: Betty Blake (m. 1970; div. 1991)
- Children: 2
- Awards: COPSS Presidents' Award
- Scientific career
- Fields: Statistics
- Workplaces: Imperial College London; Stanford University (1969–1971); University of Minnesota (1973–1983); University of Texas at Austin (1983–1989); University of Oxford (1989–1995); University of California, Santa Barbara (1995–2014)
- Doctoral advisor: David Cox

David Victor Hinkley (10 September 1944 – 11 January 2019) was a statistician known for his research in statistical models and inference and for his graduate-level books.

== Early life ==
David Victor Hinkley was born on 10 September 1944 in Kent, England. He studied mathematics and statistics at the University of Birmingham. He earned a PhD from the University of London (now Imperial College London) in 1969 under the supervision of David R. Cox.

== Career ==
While working on his PhD, Hinkley was appointed to a junior lectureship at the University of London. He spent the years 1969 to 1971 at Stanford University. In 1971, he returned to London, and then, in 1973, he moved to the University of Minnesota where he was a member of the faculty. In 1983, Hinkley moved to the University of Texas at Austin and became a faculty member. In 1989, he moved to lead the new department of statistics at the University of Oxford. In 1995, he became a professor at the University of California, Santa Barbara. He also served as chair of the department of statistics and applied probability from 1995 to 2002. He served as the director of undergraduate studies from 2003 to 2007. He retired from UC Santa Barbara in 2014.

In 1974 Hinkley and Cox published Theoretical Statistics, a textbook on statistical inference. Hinkley also collaborated with Bradley Efron, in particular on writing a paper on maximizing the conditional likelihood function and on using the observed Fisher information. Hinkley was an expert on bootstrapping, a method of computational statistics, which is largely due to Efron. With Anthony C. Davison, Hinkley wrote a widely used textbook on the subject.

== Personal life and death ==
Hinkley married Betty Blake in 1970. Together, they had two children, Sara and Steve. They divorced in 1991. Hinkley had interests in soccer, nature and classical music.

Hinkley died on January 11, 2019, at his home in Santa Barbara, California.

== Awards ==
Hinkley was an elected fellow of the American Statistical Association, a fellow of the Institute of Mathematical Statistics, fellow of the Royal Statistical Society and fellow of the American Association for the Advancement of Science. He was also an honorary fellow at the University of Edinburgh and a vice president of the Royal Statistical Society.

In 1984 Hinkley received the COPSS Presidents' Award.

== Selected publications ==
- Cox, D. R.; Hinkley, D. V. (1974). Theoretical Statistics. New York: John Wiley & Sons/Halsted Press.
- Davison, A. C.; Hinkley, D. V. (2006). Bootstrap Methods and their Application (8th printing). Cambridge: Cambridge Series in Statistical and Probabilistic Mathematics.
- Efron, B.; Hinkley, D. V. (1978). "Assessing the accuracy of the maximum likelihood estimator: Observed versus expected Fisher Information". Biometrika. 65 (3): 457–487. doi:10.1093/biomet/65.3.457. JSTOR 2335893. MR 0521817.
