= Anthony C. Davison =

British statistician (born 1958)

Anthony Christopher Davison
- Born: 28 February 1958 (age 68); London, United Kingdom

Academic background
- Education: St. John's College, University of Oxford (B.A. 1980); Imperial College London (MSc 1981, PhD 1984)
- Doctoral advisors: Helen ApSimon; Richard L. Smith

Academic work
- Discipline: Statistics
- Institutions: University of Texas at Austin; Imperial College London; University of Oxford; EPFL
- Website: https://people.epfl.ch/anthony.davison

Anthony Christopher Davison (born 28 February 1958) is a British statistician and educator. He has made contributions to bootstrap methodology, extreme value theory, likelihood inference and environmental statistics.

== Education and career ==
Davison was born in London. He attended Warwick School, followed by St. John's College, University of Oxford, where he obtained a B.A. in mathematics in 1980. He then studied at Imperial College London and obtained an MSc in statistics in 1981; his MSc project was supervised by Martin Beale. He went on to obtain a PhD in statistics in 1984 at Imperial College London under the joint supervision of environmental scientist Helen ApSimon and statistician Richard L. Smith. Between 1984 and 1986, Davison was an assistant professor at the University of Texas at Austin, then from 1986 to 1989 he was a lecturer at the Department of Mathematics at Imperial College London, and from 1989 to 1996 a university lecturer at the University of Oxford, and a fellow of Lady Margaret Hall.

Davison joined the École Polytechnique Fédérale de Lausanne (EPFL) in Switzerland in 1996 as a professor of statistics and retired in June 2025.

== Honours and awards ==
Davison was awarded a laurea honoris causa by the University of Padova in 2009, the Guy Medal in Silver of the Royal Statistical Society in 2015, and a Medallion lecture by the Institute of Mathematical Statistics in 2018. He is a Fellow of the American Statistical Association, the Institute of Mathematical Statistics, and the International Statistical Institute.

== Bibliography ==
- Davison, A. C.; Hinkley, D. V. (28 October 1997). Bootstrap Methods and their Application. Cambridge University Press. doi:10.1017/cbo9780511802843. ISBN 978-0-521-57391-7.
- Davison, A. C. (4 August 2003). Statistical Models. Cambridge University Press. doi:10.1017/cbo9780511815850. ISBN 978-0-521-77339-3.
- Davison, Anthony Christopher; Dodge, Yadolah; Wermuth, Nanny, eds. (2005). Celebrating statistics: papers in honour of Sir David Cox on the occasion of his 80th birthday. Oxford statistical science series. Oxford (GB): Oxford University Press. ISBN 978-0-19-856654-0.
- Brazzale, A. R.; Davison, A. C.; Reid, N. (31 May 2007). Applied Asymptotics: Case Studies in Small-Sample Statistics. Cambridge University Press. doi:10.1017/cbo9780511611131. ISBN 978-0-521-84703-2.
