= Annals of Statistics =

- Discipline: Statistics
- Language: English
- Edited by: Hans-Georg Müller and Harrison Zhou

Publication details
- History: 1973–present
- Publisher: Institute of Mathematical Statistics (United States)
- Impact factor: 4.904 (2021)

Standard abbreviations
- ISO 4: Ann. Stat.
- MathSciNet: Ann. Statist.

Indexing
- ISSN: 0090-5364
- JSTOR: 00905364

Links
- Journal homepage; Project Euclid

The Annals of Statistics is a peer-reviewed statistics journal published by the Institute of Mathematical Statistics. It was started in 1973 as a continuation in part of the Annals of Mathematical Statistics (1930), which was split into the Annals of Statistics and the Annals of Probability.

The journal CiteScore is 5.8, and its SCImago Journal Rank is 5.877, both from 2020.

Articles older than 3 years are available on JSTOR, and all articles since 2004 are freely available on the arXiv.

== Editorial board ==
The following persons have been editors of the journal:

- Ingram Olkin (1972–1973)
- I. Richard Savage (1974–1976)
- Rupert G. Miller (1977–1979)
- David V. Hinkley (1980–1982)
- Michael D. Perlman (1983–1985)
- Willem van Zwet (1986–1988)
- Arthur Cohen (1988–1991)
- Michael Woodroofe (1992–1994)
- Larry Brown and John Rice (1995–1997)
- Hans-Rudolf Künsch and James O. Berger (1998–2000)
- John Marden and Jon A. Wellner (2001–2003)
- Morris Eaton and Jianqing Fan (2004–2006)
- Susan Murphy and Bernard Silverman (2007–2009)
- Peter Bühlmann and T. Tony Cai (2010–2012)
- Peter Hall and Runze Li (2013–2015)
- Ed George and Tailen Hsing (2016–2018)
- Richard J. Samworth and Ming Yuan (2019–2021)
- Enno Mammen and Lan Wang (2022–2024)
- Hans-Georg Müller and Harrison Zhou (2025–2027)
