= Samuel D. Silvey =

British statistician

Samuel David Silvey was a British statistician. Among his contributions are the Lagrange multiplier test, and the use of eigenvalues of the moment matrix for the detection of multicollinearity.
