= Biometrika =

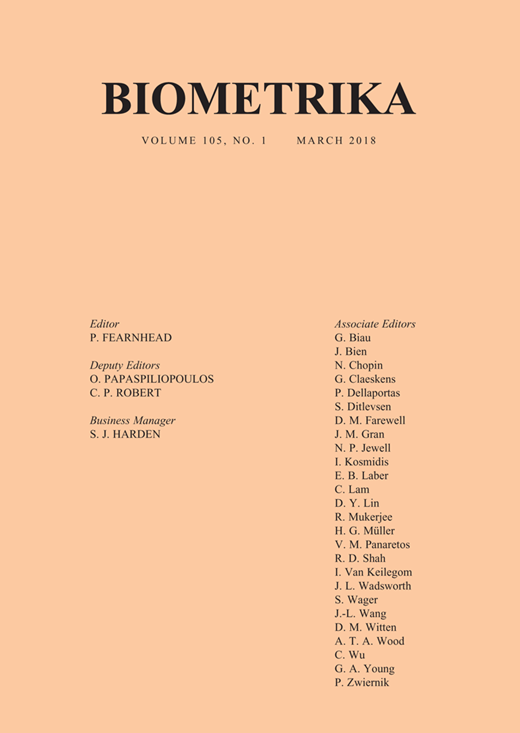
- Discipline: Statistics
- Language: English
- Edited by: Paul Fearnhead

Publication details
- History: 1901–present
- Publisher: Oxford University Press on behalf of the Biometrika Trust
- Frequency: Quarterly
- Impact factor: 2.8 (2024)

Standard abbreviations
- ISO 4: Biometrika

Indexing
- CODEN: BIOKAX
- ISSN: 0006-3444 (print); 1464-3510 (web)
- LCCN: 25005151
- JSTOR: 00063444
- OCLC no.: 934140435

Links
- Journal homepage; Online access; Biometrika Trust Website

Biometrika is a peer-reviewed scientific journal published by Oxford University Press for the Biometrika Trust. The editor-in-chief is Paul Fearnhead (Lancaster University). The principal focus of this journal is theoretical statistics. It was established in 1901 and originally appeared quarterly. It changed to three issues per year in 1977 but returned to quarterly publication in 1992.

== History ==
Biometrika was established in 1901 by Francis Galton, Karl Pearson, and Raphael Weldon to promote the study of biometrics. The history of Biometrika is covered by Cox (2001). The name of the journal was chosen by Pearson, but Francis Edgeworth insisted that it be spelt with a "k" and not a "c". Since the 1930s, it has been a journal for statistical theory and methodology. Galton's role in the journal was essentially that of a patron and the journal was run by Pearson and Weldon and after Weldon's death in 1906 by Pearson alone until he died in 1936. In the early days, the American biologists Charles Davenport and Raymond Pearl were nominally involved but they dropped out. On Pearson's death his son Egon Pearson became editor and remained in this position until 1966. David Cox was editor for the next 25 years. So, in its first 65 years Biometrika had effectively a total of just three editors, and in its first 90 years only four. Other people who were deeply involved in the journal included William Palin Elderton, an associate of Pearson's who published several articles in the early days and in 1935 became chairman of the Biometrika Trust.

In the first issue, the editors presented a statement of purpose:

It is intended that Biometrika shall serve as a means not only of collecting or publishing under one title biological data of a kind not systematically collected or published elsewhere in any other periodical, but also of spreading a knowledge of such statistical theory as may be requisite for their scientific treatment.

Its contents were to include:

- memoirs on variation, inheritance, and selection in animals and plants, based upon the examination of statistically large numbers of specimens
- those developments of statistical theory which are applicable to biological problems
- numerical tables and graphical solutions tending to reduce the labour of statistical arithmetic
- abstracts of memoirs, dealing with these subjects, which are published elsewhere
- notes on current biometric work and unsolved problems

Early volumes contained many reports on biological topics, but over the twentieth century, Biometrika became a "journal of statistics in which emphasis is placed on papers containing original theoretical contributions of direct or potential value in applications." Thus, of the five types of contents envisaged by its founders, only the second and to a lesser extent the third remain, largely shorn of their biological roots. In his centenary tribute to Karl Pearson, J. B. S. Haldane likened him to Columbus who "set out for China, and discovered America." The same might be said of Pearson's journal.

Of note, Karl Pearson had adopted as the motto of the journal a declaration of Charles Darwin that resonated with Karl Pearson's focus on biological topics and the large data sets that biology generated. In a letter to William Darwin Fox in 1855, Charles Darwin declared “I have no faith in anything short of actual measurement and the Rule of Three.” Karl Pearson adopted this declaration as the motto of his newly founded journal Biometrika. This rule of three referred to cross-multiplication, however, and not the statistical rule of three.

== Historical reference ==
To mark the centenary of "one of the world's leading academic journals in statistical theory and methodology" a commemorative volume was produced, containing articles that had appeared in a special issue of the journal and a selection of classic papers published in the journal in the years 1939–1971.

== Editors ==
The editors of the journal have been:

- 1901–1905: Francis Galton, Karl Pearson, and Raphael Weldon
- 1906–1936: Karl Pearson
- 1936–1966: Egon Pearson
- 1966–1991: David Cox
- 1991–1992: David Hinkley
- 1992–1996: Philip Dawid
- 1996–2007: Mike Titterington
- 2008–2017: Anthony Davison
- 2018–present: Paul Fearnhead

== Abstracting and indexing ==
The journal is abstracted and indexed in:

- Biological Abstracts
- BIOSIS Previews
- CAB Abstracts
- Current Contents/Agriculture, Biology, and Environmental Sciences
- Current Contents/Life Sciences
- Current Contents/Physical, Chemical and Earth Sciences
- Current Index to Statistics
- Index Medicus/MEDLINE/PubMed
- Mathematical Reviews
- ProQuest databases
- Research Papers in Economics
- Science Citation Index
- Zentralblatt MATH

According to the Journal Citation Reports, the journal has a 2024 impact factor of 2.8.
