= Elizabeth L. Scott Award =

Award for women in academia

The Elizabeth L. Scott Award is an biennial award given (in even years) by the Committee of Presidents of Statistical Societies and named in honor of Elizabeth Scott, an American statistician. This award recognizes an individual who exemplifies the contributions of Elizabeth L. Scott’s lifelong efforts to further the careers of women in academia. The award is given to an individual who has helped foster opportunities in statistics for women and is presented at the Joint Statistical Meetings. Starting in 2020, the recipient of the award will give a lecture at the Joint Statistical Meetings.

== List of Award winners ==
Winners of the Elizabeth L. Scott Award
Award date	Recipient	Institution
2026	Amy Herring	Duke University
2024	Regina Liu	Rutgers University
2022	Madhu Mazumdar	Icahn School of Medicine at Mount Sinai
2020	Amita Manatunga	Emory University
2018	Bin Yu	University of California, Berkeley
2016	Amanda L. Golbeck	University of Arkansas for Medical Sciences
2014	Kathryn Chaloner	University of Iowa
2012	Mary W. Gray	American University
2010	Mary E. Thompson	University of Waterloo
2008	Lynne Billard	University of Georgia
2006	Louise Ryan	Commonwealth Scientific and Industrial Research Organization
2004	Gladys Reynolds	Bell South
2002	Janet Norwood	US Bureau of Labor Statistics
2000	Nancy Flournoy	University of Missouri
1998	Ingram Olkin	Stanford University
1996	Grace Wahba	University of Wisconsin-Madison
1994	Donna Brogan	Emory University
1992	Florence Nightingale David	University of California, Riverside

== See also ==
- List of mathematics awards
