= List of mathematics awards =

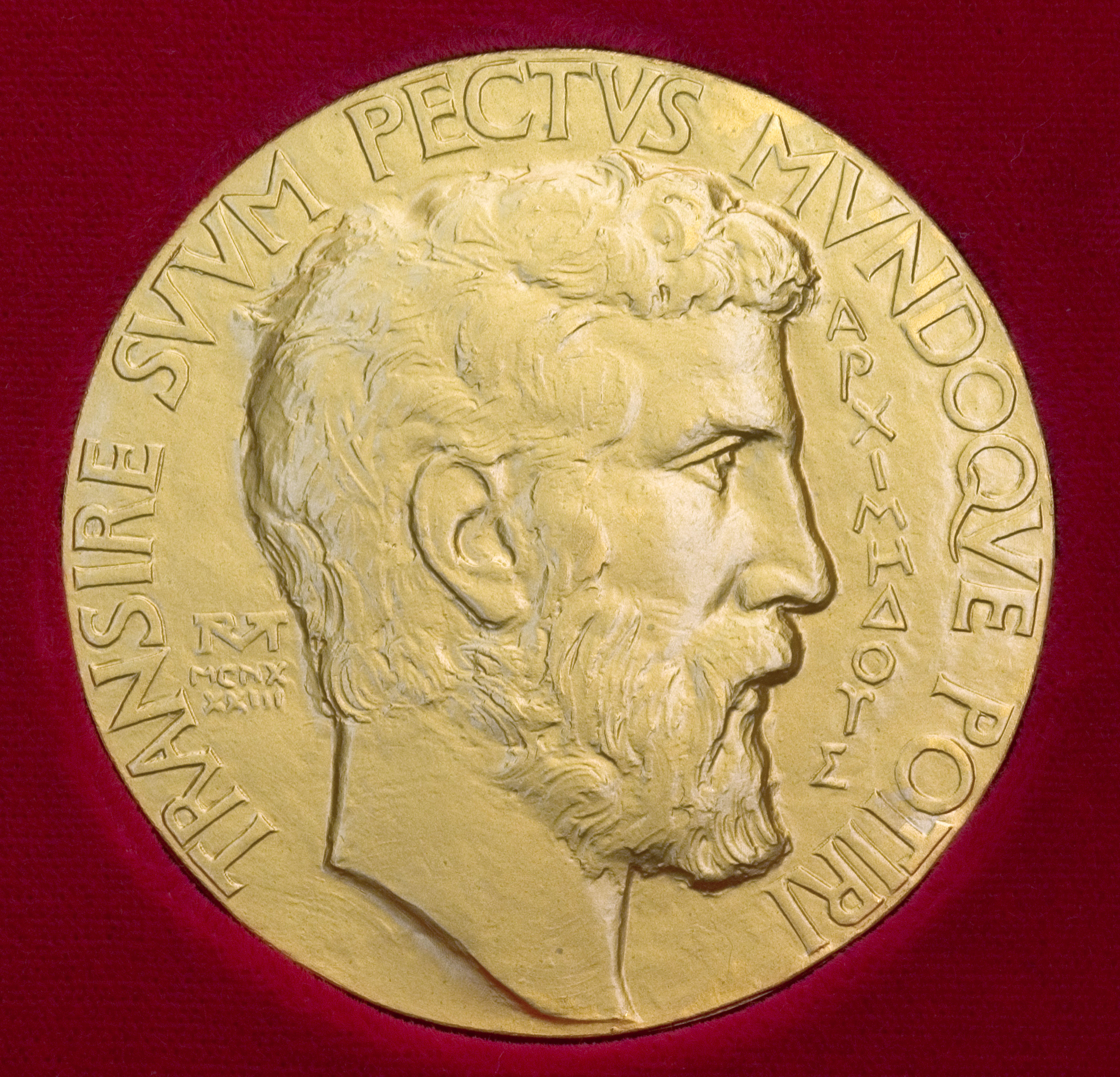
The Fields Medal

This is a list of mathematics awards.

== International ==
Award	Sponsor	Recipients/Achievement
Breakthrough Prize in Mathematics	Yuri Milner and Mark Zuckerberg	
Chern Medal	International Mathematical Union	Outstanding lifelong achievement
Copley Medal	Royal Society	Outstanding achievement
David Hilbert Award	World Federation of National Mathematics Competitions	Development of mathematics worldwide
Felix Chayes Prize	International Association for Mathematical Geosciences	Research in mathematical petrology
Fields Medal	International Mathematical Union	Outstanding achievement by mathematicians under the age of 40
Georges Matheron Lectureship	International Association for Mathematical Geosciences	Research in spatial statistics or mathematical morphology
Hans Schneider Prize in Linear Algebra	International Linear Algebra Society	Research in linear algebra
IAMG Distinguished Lectureship	International Association for Mathematical Geosciences	Research or outreach in mathematical geology
ICTP Ramanujan Prize	International Centre for Theoretical Physics	Researchers from developing countries less than 45 years old
IMU Abacus Medal	International Mathematical Union	Distinguished achievements in mathematical aspects of information science
International Prize in Statistics	International Statistical Institute	Research in statistics
John Cedric Griffiths Teaching Award	International Association for Mathematical Geosciences	Teaching about the intersection of mathematics or informatics and the Earth's nonrenewable natural resources or sedimentary geology
Kenneth O. May Prize	International Commission on the History of Mathematics	Promoting the history of mathematics internationally
Leelavati Award	International Congress of Mathematicians of the International Mathematical Union	Outreach
Paul Erdős Award	World Federation of National Mathematics Competitions	Developing mathematics competitions
Rousseeuw Prize for Statistics	Rousseeuw Foundation	Research in statistics
Taussky–Todd Prize	International Linear Algebra Society	Research in linear algebra and matrix theory

== Americas ==
Country	Award	Sponsor	Recipients/Achievement
Brazil	Brazilian Mathematical Society Award	Brazilian Mathematical Society	Expository articles
Canada	Adrien Pouliot Award	Canadian Mathematical Society	Mathematics education in Canada
Canada	Aisenstadt Prize	Centre de Recherches Mathématiques, Université de Montréal	Younger Canadian mathematicians
Canada	Coxeter–James Prize	Canadian Mathematical Society	Younger Canadian mathematicians
Canada	CRM-Fields-PIMS prize	CRM / Fields Institute / Pacific Institute for the Mathematical Sciences	Research
Canada	CRM-SSC Prize in Statistics	CRM / Statistical Society of Canada	Younger statisticians
Canada	Israel Halperin Prize	Canadian Operator Symposium	Research in operator theory or operator algebras
Canada	Jeffery–Williams Prize	Canadian Mathematical Society	Research
Canada	John L. Synge Award	Royal Society of Canada	Research
Canada	Krieger–Nelson Prize	Canadian Mathematical Society	Women in mathematics
Canada	Ribenboim Prize	Canadian Number Theory Association	Research in number theory
Canada	SSC Gold Medal	Statistical Society of Canada	Career award for outstanding contributions to statistics, or to probability, in either theoretical or applied work
Chile	National Prize for Exact Sciences	Ministry of Education	
United States	Alexanderson Award	American Institute of Mathematics	Notable paper from an AIM activity
United States	American Statistical Association Founders Award	American Statistical Association (ASA)	Distinguished service to the ASA
United States	AMS Centennial Fellowship	American Mathematical Society	Mathematicians who received their doctorates 3-12 years ago
United States	AMS Distinguished Public Service Award	American Mathematical Society	Research within the past five years
United States	AWM Service Award	Association for Women in Mathematics	Volunteer service
United States	AWM/MAA Falconer Lecturer	Association for Women in Mathematics and Mathematical Association of America	Women in mathematics or in mathematics education
United States	AWM-SIAM Sonia Kovalevsky Lecturer	Association for Women in Mathematics and Society for Industrial and Applied Mathematics	Women who have made significant contributions to applied or computational mathematics.
United States	AWM–Microsoft Research Prize in Algebra and Number Theory	Association for Women in Mathematics	Young female researcher in algebra or number theory
United States	Albert Leon Whiteman Memorial Prize	American Mathematical Society	Notable exposition and exceptional scholarship in the history of mathematics
United States	Alice T. Schafer Prize	Association for Women in Mathematics	Undergraduate women
United States	Andrei Borisovich Vistelius Research Award	International Association for Mathematical Geosciences	Young scientist for promising contributions in applied mathematics or informatics related to earth sciences
United States	Beckenbach Book Prize	Mathematical Association of America	Distinguished, innovative books published by the Mathematical Association of America
United States	Blackwell–Tapia prize	National Science Foundation	Significant research contributions in their field, and who has worked to address under-representation of minority groups in mathematics
United States	Blumenthal Award	American Mathematical Society	Substantial contribution to research in pure mathematics (No longer awarded)
United States	Bôcher Memorial Prize	American Mathematical Society	Notable research memoir in analysis
United States	COPSS Distinguished Achievement Award and Lectureship (formerly R. A. Fisher Lectureship)	Joint Statistical Meetings	Achievement and scholarship in statistical science
United States	COPSS Presidents' Award	Committee of Presidents of Statistical Societies	Outstanding contributions to the profession of statistics
United States	Carl B. Allendoerfer Award	Mathematical Association of America	Expository excellence published in Mathematics Magazine
United States	Chauvenet Prize	Mathematical Association of America	Outstanding expository article on a mathematical topic
United States	Cole Prize	American Mathematical Society	Two prizes: Outstanding contribution to algebra, outstanding contribution to number theory
United States	Dannie Heineman Prize for Mathematical Physics	American Physical Society and American Institute of Physics	Mathematical physics
United States	Dantzig Prize	Society for Industrial and Applied Mathematics	Research has a major impact on the field of mathematical programming
United States	David P. Robbins Prize	American Mathematical Society and Mathematical Association of America	Novel research in algebra, combinatorics, or discrete mathematics
United States	Deborah and Franklin Haimo Awards	Mathematical Association of America	College or university teachers whose success has had far-reaching influence
United States	E. H. Moore Research Article Prize	American Mathematical Society	Outstanding research article which appeared in one of the AMS primary research journals
United States	Edyth May Sliffe Award	Mathematical Association of America	High school teachers whose students performed well on the AMC 12
United States	Elizabeth L. Scott Award	Committee of Presidents of Statistical Societies	Individual who has helped foster opportunities in statistics for women
United States	Euler Book Prize	Mathematical Association of America	Outstanding book in mathematics that is likely to improve the public view of the field
United States	Florence Nightingale David Award	Committee of Presidents of Statistical Societies / Caucus for Women in Statistics	Female statistician who exemplifies the contributions of Florence Nightingale David and proven herself to be an outstanding role model
United States	Franz Edelman Award	Institute for Operations Research and the Management Sciences	Excellence in the execution of operations research on the organizational level
United States	Lanchester Prize	Institute for Operations Research and the Management Sciences	Best contribution to operations research and the management sciences published in English
United States	Fulkerson Prize	American Mathematical Society	Outstanding papers in discrete mathematics
United States	George David Birkhoff Prize	American Mathematical Society / Society for Industrial and Applied Mathematics	Outstanding contribution to applied mathematics
United States	George Pólya Award	Mathematical Association of America	Articles of expository excellence published in the College Mathematics Journal
United States	George Pólya Prize (SIAM)	Society for Industrial and Applied Mathematics	For a notable application of combinatorial theory; or for a notable contribution in another area of interest to George Pólya such as approximation theory, complex analysis, number theory, etc.
United States	Halbert L. Dunn Award	National Association for Public Health Statistics and Information Systems	Outstanding and lasting contributions to the field of vital and health statistics at the national, state, or local level
United States	Euler Medal	Institute of Combinatorics and its Applications	Distinguished career contributions to combinatorics by an active member of the institute
United States	Hall Medal	Institute of Combinatorics and its Applications	Outstanding achievements by members under age 40
United States	Kirkman Medal	Institute of Combinatorics and its Applications	Outstanding achievements by members who are within four years past their Ph.D.
United States	J. D. Crawford Prize	Society for Industrial and Applied Mathematics	Achievements in dynamical systems
United States	J. H. Wilkinson Prize for Numerical Software	Society for Industrial and Applied Mathematics	Outstanding contributions in numerical software
United States	James H. Wilkinson Prize in Numerical Analysis and Scientific Computing	Society for Industrial and Applied Mathematics	Research in, or other contributions to, numerical analysis and scientific computing
United States	Joan & Joseph Birman Research Prize in Topology and Geometry	Association for Women in Mathematics	Outstanding young female researcher in topology or geometry
United States	John von Neumann Lecture	Society for Industrial and Applied Mathematics	Outstanding contributions to applied mathematical sciences and effective communication of those ideas to the community
United States	John von Neumann Theory Prize	Institute for Operations Research and the Management Sciences	Contributions to theory in operations research and management sciences
United States	Josiah Willard Gibbs Lectureship	American Mathematical Society	Outstanding achievement in applied mathematics
United States	Karp Prize	Association for Symbolic Logic	Outstanding paper or book on symbolic logic
United States	LTPP Data Analysis Contest	American Society of Civil Engineers and Federal Highway Administration	Use of Long-Term Pavement Performance (LTPP) data in analysis
United States	Leroy P. Steele Prize	American Mathematical Society	Mathematics
United States	Levi L. Conant Prize	American Mathematical Society	Outstanding expository papers published in the Bulletin of the American Mathematical Society or the Notices of the American Mathematical Society
United States	Louise Hay Award	Association for Women in Mathematics	Contributions as a math educator
United States	Loève Prize	University of California, Berkeley	Outstanding contributions in mathematical probability for those under age 45
United States	M. Gweneth Humphreys Award	Association for Women in Mathematics	Mathematics educators who have exhibited outstanding mentorship
United States	MAA Certificate of Merit	Mathematical Association of America	Special work or service to mathematics or the broader mathematics community
United States	Merten M. Hasse Prize	Mathematical Association of America	Exceptional expository paper appearing in an MAA publication, at least one of whose authors is a younger mathematician
United States	Michael Brin Prize in Dynamical Systems	Michael Brin	Mathematicians who have made outstanding advances in dynamical systems and are within 14 years of their PhD
United States	Millennium Prize Problems	Clay Mathematics Institute	Solution to any of the Birch and Swinnerton-Dyer conjecture, Hodge conjecture, Navier–Stokes existence and smoothness, P versus NP problem, Poincaré conjecture, Riemann hypothesis, and Yang–Mills existence and mass gap.
United States	Monroe H. Martin Prize	University of Maryland, College Park	Outstanding paper in applied mathematics, including numerical analysis, by a young researcher
United States	Morgan Prize	American Mathematical Society, Mathematical Association of America and Society for Industrial and Applied Mathematics	Undergraduate student in North America who demonstrates superior mathematics research
United States	NAS Award in Mathematics	National Academy of Sciences	Excellence of research in the mathematical sciences
United States	Nemmers Prize in Mathematics	Northwestern University	Mathematics
United States	Noether Lecture	Association for Women in Mathematics and American Mathematical Society	Women who have made fundamental and sustained contributions to the mathematical sciences
United States	Norbert Wiener Prize in Applied Mathematics	American Mathematical Society and Society for Industrial and Applied Mathematics	Outstanding contribution to applied mathematics
United States	Oswald Veblen Prize in Geometry	American Mathematical Society	Notable research in geometry or topology
United States	Paul R. Halmos – Lester R. Ford Award	Mathematical Association of America	Authors of articles of expository excellence published in The American Mathematical Monthly or Mathematics Magazine
United States	Presidential Award for Excellence in Mathematics and Science Teaching	President of the United States	Kindergarten through 12th-grade mathematics or science teacher
United States	RSA Award for Excellence in Mathematics	RSA Conference	Innovations and contributions in cryptography and related mathematics
United States	Ramon E. Moore prize	University of Texas at El Paso	Computer-assisted proof
United States	Richard C. DiPrima Prize	Society for Industrial and Applied Mathematics	Early career researcher who has done outstanding research in applied mathematics
United States	Ruth I. Michler Memorial Prize	Association for Women in Mathematics	Outstanding research by a female mathematician who has recently earned tenure
United States	Ruth Lyttle Satter Prize in Mathematics	American Mathematical Society	Outstanding contribution to mathematics research by a woman
United States	SIAM Fellow	Society for Industrial and Applied Mathematics	Outstanding members of the Society for Industrial and Applied Mathematics
United States	Sadosky Prize	Association for Women in Mathematics	Outstanding young female researcher in mathematical analysis
United States	Salem Prize	Institute for Advanced Study	Young mathematicians, for outstanding work in Raphaël Salem's field of interest
United States	Shewhart Medal	American Society for Quality	Outstanding technical leadership in modern quality control
United States	Sloan Research Fellowship	Alfred P. Sloan Foundation	Support and recognition to early-career scientists and scholars
United States	Snedecor Award	Committee of Presidents of Statistical Societies	Statistician for contribution to biometry
United States	Stefan Bergman Prize	American Mathematical Society	Mathematical research in the theory and applications of the kernel function and its applications, or function-theoretic methods for elliptic partial differential equations
United States	Tarski Lectures	University of California, Berkeley	Distinction in mathematical logic and series of lectures
United States	The Taylor Prize in Mathematics	George Washington University	Outstanding mathematics graduate student
United States	Theodore von Kármán Prize	Society for Industrial and Applied Mathematics	Notable application of mathematics to mechanics and/or the engineering sciences
United States	Van Amringe Mathematical Prize	Columbia University	Mathematics student at Columbia College deemed most proficient in the mathematical subjects
United States	W. T. and Idalia Reid Prize	Society for Industrial and Applied Mathematics	Outstanding research in, or other contributions to, differential equations and control theory
United States	Wilks Memorial Award	American Statistical Association	Outstanding contributions to statistics
United States	William Christian Krumbein Medal	International Association for Mathematical Geosciences	Distinction in application of mathematics or informatics to the earth sciences, service to the IAMG, and support to professions involved in the earth sciences
United States	William Lowell Putnam Mathematical Competition	Mathematical Association of America	Undergraduates at institutions of higher learning in the United States and Canada

== Asia ==
Country	Award	Sponsor	Achievement/Recipients
China	Chern Prize (ICCM)	International Congress of Chinese Mathematicians	Chinese mathematicians and those of Chinese descent for exceptional contributions to mathematical research or to public service activities in support of mathematics
China	Morningside Medal	International Congress of Chinese Mathematicians	Exceptional mathematicians of Chinese descent under age of 45 for achievements in mathematics and applied mathematics
Hong Kong, China	Shaw Prize	Shaw Prize Foundation	Outstanding contributions in astronomy, life science and medicine, and mathematical sciences
India	Infosys Prize in Mathematical Science	Infosys Science Foundation	Outstanding achievements of contemporary researchers and scientists across six categories, including Mathematical Sciences
India	Ramanujan Prize	Shanmugha Arts, Science, Technology & Research Academy	Young mathematician, for outstanding work in Ramanujan's fields of interest
India	Srinivasa Ramanujan Medal	Indian National Science Academy	Work in the mathematical sciences
Israel	Erdős Prize	Israel Mathematical Union	Israeli mathematician in any field of mathematics and computer science
Israel	Mathematical Neuroscience Prize	Israel Brain Technologies	Significantly advanced the understanding of the neural mechanisms of perception, behavior and thought through the application of mathematical analysis and modeling
Israel	Wolf Prize in Mathematics	Wolf Foundation	Mathematicians
Japan	Geometry prize	Mathematical Society of Japan	Significant or long-time research works in the field of geometry, including differential geometry, topology, and algebraic geometry
Japan	Kyoto Prize in Basic Sciences	Inamori Foundation	Global achievement in basic sciences
South Korea	Korea Science Award	Ministry of Science and ICT, National Research Foundation of Korea	Prizes in various categories of science, including one for math.
Pakistan	Abdus Salam Award	International Centre for Theoretical Physics Pakistan chapter	Pakistani nationals in the field of chemistry, mathematics, physics, biology

== Europe ==
Country	Award	Sponsor	Notes
Europe	European Mathematical Society Prizes	European Mathematical Society	Excellent contributions in Mathematics by researchers younger than age 35
Europe	ERCIM Cor Baayen Award	European Research Consortium for Informatics and Mathematics	Researcher in computer science and applied mathematics
Europe	EURO Gold Medal	Association of European Operational Research Societies	Outstanding contribution to the field of operations research
Europe	European Prize in Combinatorics	Eurocomb	Research in combinatorics
Europe	George Box Medal	European Network for Business and Industrial Statistics	Outstanding work in the development and the application of statistical methods in European business and industry
Europe	Hausdorff Medal	European Set Theory Society	Impactful work in set theory
Europe	Louis Bachelier Prize	London Mathematical Society, Natixis Foundation for Quantitative Research and Société de Mathématiques Appliquées et Industrielles	Exceptional contributions to mathematical modelling in finance, insurance, risk management and/or scientific computing applied to finance and insurance
Armenia	Emil Artin Junior Prize in Mathematics	Armenian Mathematical Union	Former student of an Armenian university, who is under the age of thirty-five, for outstanding contributions in algebra, geometry, topology, and number theory
Austria	Prize of the Austrian Mathematical Society	Austrian Mathematical Society	Promising young mathematician for outstanding achievements
Belgium	Charles Lagrange Prize	Royal Academy of Science, Letters and Fine Arts of Belgium	Best mathematical or experimental work contributing to the progress of mathematical knowledge
Belgium	Eugene Catalan Prize	Royal Academy of Science, Letters and Fine Arts of Belgium	Progress in pure mathematics
Belgium	Francois Deruyts Prize	Royal Academy of Science, Letters and Fine Arts of Belgium	Progress in synthetic or analytic superior geometry
Belgium	Jacques Deruyts Prize	Royal Academy of Science, Letters and Fine Arts of Belgium	Progress in mathematical analysis
France	Ampère Prize	French Academy of Sciences	Outstanding research work in mathematics or physics
France	E. W. Beth Dissertation Prize	Association for Logic, Language and Information	Outstanding PhD theses in logic, language, and information
France	Élie Cartan Prize	Institut de France	Mathematician who has introduced new ideas or solved a difficult problem
France	Fermat Prize	Institut de Mathématiques de Toulouse	Research into statements of variational principles, foundations of probability and analytic geometry, or Number theory.
France	Jacques Herbrand Prize	French Academy of Sciences	Young researchers under age 35 in non-military applied mathematics and physics
France	Leconte Prize	French Academy of Sciences	Important discoveries in mathematics, physics, and biology
France	Peccot Lectures	Collège de France	Mathematician under 30 years old
France	Poincaré Medal	Institut de France etc.	Eminent mathematician. Established in 1914 and eliminated in 1997 in favor of the Grande Médaille
France	Poncelet Prize	French Academy of Sciences	Work contributing to the progress of pure or (mostly) applied mathematics
France	Prix Francoeur	Institut de France	Authors of works useful to the progress of pure and applied mathematics (discontinued)
France	Sophie Germain Prize	French Academy of Sciences	Mathematics prize
France	Émile Picard Medal	French Academy of Sciences	Outstanding mathematician
Germany	Ackermann–Teubner Memorial Award	Leipzig University	Work in mathematical analysis (awarded 1912 to 1941)
Germany	Cantor medal	German Mathematical Society	Mathematicians who are associated with the German language
Germany	Carl Friedrich Gauss Prize	German Mathematical Society / International Mathematical Union	Outstanding mathematical contributions that have found significant applications outside of mathematics
Germany	Gauss Lectureship	German Mathematical Society	Current developments in mathematics, aimed at the interested public
Germany	Heinz Gumin Prize	Carl Friedrich von Siemens Foundation	Outstanding mathematician in Germany, Austria or Switzerland.
Germany	John Todd Award	Oberwolfach Research Institute for Mathematics	Excellent early-career mathematician working in numerical analysis
Germany	Karl Georg Christian von Staudt Prize	Otto and Edith Haupt Foundation	Outstanding, pioneering and published research results in the field of pure mathematics by a mathematician working at a German university or research institution
Germany	Oberwolfach Prize	Oberwolfach Research Institute for Mathematics	Young European mathematician for excellent achievements in changing fields of mathematics
Germany	Richard von Mises Prize	Gesellschaft für Angewandte Mathematik und Mechanik	Young scientist (not older than 36) for outstanding scientific achievements in applied mathematics and mechanics
Hungary	Alfréd Rényi Prize	Hungarian Academy of Sciences	Outstanding performance in mathematics research
Hungary	Bolyai Prize	Hungarian Academy of Sciences	Mathematicians having published their monograph describing their own highly important new results
Hungary	Paul Erdős Prize	Hungarian Academy of Sciences	Hungarian mathematicians not older than 40
Italy	Caccioppoli Prize	Italian Mathematical Union	Italian mathematician not exceeding the age of 38 who established a wide international reputation
Italy	International Giovanni Sacchi Landriani Prize	Istituto Lombardo Accademia di Scienze e Lettere	Original contributions to the field of numerical methods for partial differential equations
Italy	Riemann Prize	Riemann International School of Mathematics	Outstanding mathematicians between 40 and 65 years of age
Italy	Stampacchia Medal	Italian Mathematical Union	Outstanding contributions to the field of calculus of variations and related applications
Italy	Vinti Prize	Italian Mathematical Union	Italian mathematician not exceeding the age of 40, in recognition of his/her contributions to the field of Mathematical Analysis
Italy	Bartolozzi Prize	Italian Mathematical Union	Female Italian mathematicians below the age of 40
Norway	Abel Prize	Norwegian Academy of Science and Letters	Outstanding scientific work in the field of mathematics
Poland	Stefan Banach Prize	Polish Mathematical Society	Achievements to mathematics
Poland	Kuratowski Prize	Polish Academy of Sciences / Polish Mathematical Society	Achievements in mathematics by young Polish mathematicians under the age of 30
Poland	Sierpiński Medal	University of Warsaw / Polish Mathematical Society	Outstanding scientific contributions by mathematicians with connections to Poland
Romania	Simion Stoilow Prize	Romanian Academy	Achievements in mathematics
Russia	Demidov Prize	Russian Academy of Sciences	Outstanding achievements in natural sciences and humanities
Russia	Lobachevsky Medal	Kazan Federal University	Outstanding contributions to geometry
Russia	Lobachevsky Prize	Russian Academy of Sciences	Award in honor of Nikolai Lobachevsky
Spain	Ferran Sunyer i Balaguer Prize	Ferran Sunyer i Balaguer Foundation	Outstanding expository monograph, presenting the latest developments in an active area of research
Sweden	Rolf Schock Prize in Mathematics	Royal Swedish Academy of Sciences	Mathematics
Sweden	Wallenberg Prize	Swedish Mathematical Society	Research by a Swedish mathematician that has a Ph.D. but no permanent research position
Switzerland	Heinz Hopf Prize	ETH Zurich	Outstanding scientific work in pure mathematics
Switzerland	Ostrowski Prize	Ostrowski Foundation	Outstanding achievements in pure mathematics and in the foundations of numerical mathematics
United Kingdom	Adams Prize	University of Cambridge	Distinguished research in the mathematical sciences
United Kingdom	Anne Bennett Prize	London Mathematical Society	Work in, influence on or service to mathematics, particularly in relation to advancing the careers of women in mathematics
United Kingdom	Berwick Prize	London Mathematical Society	Recognition of an outstanding piece of mathematical research
United Kingdom	Christopher Zeeman Medal	Institute of Mathematics and its Applications / London Mathematical Society	Recognises mathematics popularisers and pioneers of public mathematics engagement
United Kingdom	Clay Research Award	Clay Mathematics Institute	Major breakthroughs in mathematical research
United Kingdom	David Crighton Medal	Institute of Mathematics and its Applications / London Mathematical Society	Honorific medal awarded to mathematicians
United Kingdom	De Morgan Medal	London Mathematical Society	Contributions to mathematics
United Kingdom	Forder Lectureship	London Mathematical Society	Research mathematician from the United Kingdom who has made an eminent contribution to mathematics and can communicate ideas effectively to a broader audience
United Kingdom	Fröhlich Prize	London Mathematical Society	Original and extremely innovative work in any branch of mathematics
United Kingdom	Gunning Victoria Jubilee Prize	Royal Society of Edinburgh	Original work done by scientists resident in or connected with Scotland
United Kingdom	Guy Medal	Royal Statistical Society	Distinction in statistics
United Kingdom	ICTCM Award	International Conference on Technology in Collegiate Mathematics	Individual or group for excellence and innovation in using technology to enhance the teaching and learning of mathematics
United Kingdom	IMA Gold Medal	Institute of Mathematics and its Applications	Outstanding contributions to mathematics and its applications over a period of years
United Kingdom	Keith Medal	Royal Society of Edinburgh	Scientific paper published in the society's scientific journals, preference being given to a paper containing a discovery, either in mathematics or earth sciences (No longer awarded)
United Kingdom	Kolmogorov Medal	University of London	Distinguished researchers with life-long contributions to one of the fields initiated by Andrey Kolmogorov
United Kingdom	Leslie Fox Prize for Numerical Analysis	Institute of Mathematics and its Applications	Young numerical analysts worldwide
United Kingdom	Lighthill-Thwaites Prize for Applied Mathematics	Institute of Mathematics and its Applications	Early career applied mathematicians worldwide.
United Kingdom	Mayhew Prize	University of Cambridge	Student showing the greatest distinction in applied mathematics
United Kingdom	Naylor Prize and Lectureship	London Mathematical Society	Work in applied mathematics and/or the applications of mathematics, and lecturing gifts
United Kingdom	Neumann Prize	British Society for the History of Mathematics	Book in English (including books in translation) dealing with the history of mathematics and aimed at a broad audience
United Kingdom	Pólya Prize (LMS)	London Mathematical Society	Outstanding creativity in, imaginative exposition of, or distinguished contribution to, mathematics within the United Kingdom
United Kingdom	Rollo Davidson Prize	Rollo Davidson Trust	Early-career probabilists
United Kingdom	Senior Whitehead Prize	London Mathematical Society	Work in, influence on or service to mathematics, or recognition of lecturing gifts in the field of mathematics
United Kingdom	Shephard Prize	London Mathematical Society	Making a contribution to mathematics with a strong intuitive component
United Kingdom	Sir Edmund Whittaker Memorial Prize	Edinburgh Mathematical Society	Outstanding young mathematician having a specified connection with Scotland
United Kingdom	Smith's Prize	University of Cambridge	Research students in mathematics and theoretical physics at the University of Cambridge
United Kingdom	Sylvester Medal	Royal Society	Early- to mid-career stage scientist rather than an established mathematician
United Kingdom	Thomas Bond Sprague Prize	University of Cambridge	Greatest distinction in actuarial science, finance, insurance, mathematics of operational research, probability, risk and statistics in the Master of Mathematics/Master of Advanced Studies examinations
United Kingdom	Tyson Medal	University of Cambridge	Best performance in subjects relating to astronomy
United Kingdom	Whitehead Prize	London Mathematical Society	Mathematicians working in the United Kingdom who are at an early stage of their career
United Kingdom	Copley Medal	Royal Society	Outstanding achievements in research in any branch of science.

== Oceania ==
Country	Award	Sponsor	Notes
Australia	Australian Mathematical Society Medal	Australian Mathematical Society	Distinguished mathematical sciences research by members of the Australian Mathematical Society
Australia	George Szekeres Medal	Australian Mathematical Society	Outstanding research contributions over a fifteen-year period
Australia	Hannan Medal	Australian Academy of Science	Achievements by Australians in the fields of pure mathematics, applied and computational mathematics, and statistical science
Australia	Moran Medal	Australian Academy of Science	Outstanding research by Australian scientists under 40 years of age in applied probability, biometrics, mathematical genetics, psychometrics, and statistics
Australia	Phillip Law Postdoctoral Award for the Physical Sciences	Royal Society of Victoria	Early career research
Australia	Thomas Ranken Lyle Medal	Australian Academy of Science	Mathematician or physicist
New Zealand	Hector Medal	Royal Society Te Apārangi	Researcher who has undertaken work of great scientific or technological merit and has made an outstanding contribution to the advancement of the particular branch of science
New Zealand	Aitken Lectureship	New Zealand Mathematical Society	To complete a lecture tour of UK universities, awarded alternately with the Forder Lectureship.

== See also ==
- Lists of awards
- Lists of science and technology awards
