= COPSS Distinguished Achievement Award and Lectureship =

Statistical award

The COPSS Distinguished Achievement Award and Lectureship (formerly known as R. A. Fisher Award and Lectureship) is a very high recognition of achievement and scholarship in statistical science that recognizes the highly significant impact of statistical methods on scientific investigations. The award was funded in 1963 by the North American Committee of Presidents of Statistical Societies (COPSS) "to honor both the contributions of Sir Ronald Aylmer Fisher and the work of a present–day statistician for their advancement of statistical theory and applications." The COPSS Starting in 1964, the Distinguished Lecture is given at the Joint Statistical Meetings in North America and is subsequently published in a statistics journal. The lecturer receives a plaque and a cash award of US$2,000. It is given every year if a nominee considered eligible and worthy is found, which one was in all but five years up to 1984, and in all years since. In June 2020, the name of the award was changed to its current name after discussions concerning Fisher's controversial views on race and eugenics.

== Past recipients of the award ==
- 1964 Maurice Bartlett
- 1965 Oscar Kempthorne
- 1967 John Tukey
- 1968 Leo Goodman
- 1970 Leonard Savage
- 1971 Cuthbert Daniel
- 1972 William G. Cochran
- 1973 Jerome Cornfield
- 1974 George E. P. Box
- 1975 Herman Chernoff
- 1976 George Alfred Barnard
- 1977 R. C. Bose
- 1978 William Kruskal
- 1979 C. R. Rao
- 1982 F. J. Anscombe
- 1983 I. R. Savage
- 1985 Theodore W. Anderson
- 1986 David H. Blackwell
- 1987 Frederick Mosteller
- 1988 Erich Leo Lehmann
- 1989 David R. Cox
- 1990 Donald A. S. Fraser
- 1991 David Brillinger
- 1992 Paul Meier
- 1993 Herbert Robbins
- 1994 Elizabeth A. Thompson
- 1995 Norman Breslow
- 1996 Bradley Efron
- 1997 Colin Mallows
- 1998 Arthur P. Dempster
- 1999 Jack Kalbfleisch
- 2000 Ingram Olkin
- 2001 James O. Berger
- 2002 Raymond Carroll
- 2003 Adrian F. M. Smith
- 2004 Donald Rubin
- 2005 R. Dennis Cook
- 2006 Terence Speed
- 2007 Marvin Zelen
- 2008 Ross L. Prentice
- 2009 Noel Cressie
- 2010 Bruce G. Lindsay
- 2011 C.F. Jeff Wu
- 2012 Roderick J. A. Little
- 2013 Peter J. Bickel
- 2014 Grace Wahba
- 2015 Stephen Fienberg
- 2016 Alice S. Whittemore
- 2017 Robert E. Kass
- 2018 Susan Murphy
- 2019 Paul R. Rosenbaum
- 2020 Kathryn Roeder
- 2021 Wing Hung Wong
- 2022 Nancy Reid
- 2023 Bin Yu
- 2024 Robert Tibshirani
- 2025 James Robins
- 2026 Larry Wasserman

== Renaming of the lectureship ==
On June 4, 2020, following national movements to fight systemic racism and police brutality in response to the murder of George Floyd, one of the Lectureship award committee members, Daniela Witten (UW), started a discussion on renaming the Fisher Lectureship on Twitter as R. A. Fisher was a eugenicist. A petition to "Rename The Fisher Lecture After David Blackwell" was initiated by Miles Ott (Smith) on Change.org. The COPSS leadership responded by soliciting input via an online form on the official website.

Harry Crane (Rutgers), Joseph Guinness (Cornell) and Ryan Martin (NCSU) posted a comment arguing against the renaming on June 13, 2020. They argued that the lectureship was established to honor Fisher's scientific achievement, not the scientist. They proposed to amend the description of the lectureship instead of renaming it.

On June 15 the Executive Director of ASA, Ron Wasserstein, notified its members that the leadership has recommended changing the lectureship name to COPSS. The process that led to the decision was unclear. Ron commented on Twitter, "There is no principle of greater value than the principle of strengthening the statistical community by moving forward to form a more just, equitable, diverse, and inclusive society".

On June 23, the name R. A. Fisher Award and Lectureship was officially retired and the announced recipient of the award for 2020, Kathryn Roeder, was to receive the award under the new name. The chair of COPSS, Bhramar Mukherjee, also made the announcement on Twitter. In their statement, the COPSS mentioned that they retired the previous name of the award "to advance a more just, equitable, diverse, and inclusive statistical community."

== Other lecture series named after R. A. Fisher ==
Two other series of lectures are also named after R. A. Fisher:

- The Fisher Memorial Lecture on an application of mathematics to biology, usually given in the UK, first given in 1964
- The Sir Ronald Fisher Lecture on genetics, evolutionary biology or statistics, given at the University of Adelaide, Australia, first given in 1990

== See also ==
- COPSS Presidents' Award
- International Prize in Statistics
- Guy Medals
- List of mathematics awards
