= Amanda L. Golbeck =

American statistician

- Born: Amanda L. Golbeck
- Occupation(s): Statistician, social scientist, and academic leader

Amanda L. Golbeck is a statistician, social scientist, and academic leader. She is known for her book, Leadership and Women in Statistics, and her book on Elizabeth L. Scott, Equivalence: Elizabeth L. Scott at Berkeley. She is known for her pioneering definition of health numeracy.

Golbeck is a professor in the Department of Biostatistics and the associate dean for academic affairs in the Fay W. Boozman College of Public Health at the University of Arkansas for Medical Sciences. She is chair of the AMS-ASA-MAA-SIAM Data Committee that oversees the Annual Survey of the Mathematical Sciences, as well as a member of the editorial board of Significance Magazine. Previously, she was the vice president for academic affairs at the Kansas Board of Regents and one of only seventeen American women statisticians known in 2016 to have ever held a senior academic leadership position.

== Education ==
Golbeck received a BA in anthropology from Grinnell College in 1974, an MA in anthropology at the University of California - Berkeley in 1977, and an MA in statistics from the University of California - Berkeley in 1979. She then earned her PhD in biostatistics from the University of California - Berkeley in 1983 with Elizabeth L. Scott as her advisor. Her dissertation, Statistical Theory of a Life Table for Human Fertility, was supervised by Chin Long Chiang. She has certificates in negotiation from the Harvard University John F. Kennedy School in 2006, leadership from the American Association of State Colleges and Universities in 2001, and educational management at the Harvard University Graduate School of Education in 1997.

== Awards and honors ==
In 1999, Golbeck received a Grinnell College Alumni Award. In 2011, she was elected to be a Fellow of the American Statistical Association, “For highly influential leadership, especially for her significant organizational and system changes in several academic institutions; for her exemplary mentorship of junior faculty and students; for her pioneering work in health numeracy; and for important contributions to research in public health and medicine.” In 2011, Golbeck was elected to membership of the International Statistical Institute. In 2016, she received a Fulbright Specialist Award for the University of Latvia in Riga. Golbeck was also awarded the Committee of Presidents of Statistical Societies Elizabeth L. Scott Award in that same year, “for her outstanding efforts in enhancing the status of women and minorities, fostering new leadership opportunities for women and men, promoting diversity at all levels, and advocating for a more inclusive, open and supportive atmosphere in statistical sciences.” She was the 13th recipient of this award, which was initiated in 1992.
