= Almost symplectic manifold =

In differential geometry, an almost symplectic structure on a differentiable manifold $M$ is a non-degenerate two-form $\omega$ on $M$. If, in addition, $\omega$ is closed, then it is a symplectic structure.

An almost symplectic manifold is equivalent to an Sp-structure; requiring $\omega$ to be closed is an integrability condition.

== Relation to other geometric structures ==
An almost symplectic manifold is a pair $(M, \omega)$ of a smooth manifold and an almost symplectic structure. The manifold $M$ can be equipped with extra structures, such as a positive-definite bilinear form $g$ (i.e. a Riemannian metric) or an almost complex structure $J$. Furthermore, these extra structures can be required to be compatible with each other, making the quadruple $(M, \omega, g, J)$ into an almost Hermitian manifold.

However, this definition does not assume any further integrability condition. With increasing assumptions on integrability, one gets increasingly rigid (i.e. less generic) geometric structures:

1. Almost symplectic manifolds. Can always be extended to an almost Hermitian structure.
2. symplectic manifolds: $\omega$ closed. Can always be extended to an almost Kähler structure.
3. complex manifolds: $J$ integrable. Can always be extended to an Hermitian structure.
4. Kähler manifolds: $\omega$ closed and $J$ integrable.

Note that, for instance, an almost symplectic manifold might be extensible to inequivalent almost Hermitian manifolds, which is why they are different concepts.

The inclusion relations are $4 \subset 3 \cap 2$ and $3 \cup 2 \subset 1$. All these inclusions are strict, due to the following counterexamples:

- The Kodaira–Thurston 4-manifold is symplectic and complex but not Kähler. Indeed, it is a compact nilmanifold and its first Betti number is $b_1 = 3$, but any compact Kähler manifold must have even odd-Betti numbers.
- Fernández, Gotay and Gray described a compact 4-manifold which is symplectic but not complex, hence not Kähler.
- The Hopf surface, and more generally Hopf manifolds, are compact complex manifolds but not symplectic, hence not Kähler.
- For a small $\epsilon > 0$, the 2-form $\omega_{\varepsilon}=\sum_{i=1}^n d p_i \wedge d q_i+\varepsilon q_1 d p_2 \wedge d q_2$ makes $\R^{2n}$ into an almost symplectic manifold that is not symplectic nor complex.

== From almost symplectic to almost Hermitian manifolds ==
Given an almost symplectic manifold $(M, \omega)$, an almost Hermitian structure $(\omega, g, J)$ can be constructed by means of a structural group reduction from $\mathrm{Sp}(2 n, \mathbb{R})$ to $\mathrm{U}(n)$ and the associated bundle construction.

Indeed, the $\omega$-symplectic frame bundle $P_{\mathrm{Sp}} \rightarrow M$ has structure group $\operatorname{Sp}(2 n, \mathbb{R})$. The subgroup $\mathrm{U}(n)=\operatorname{Sp}(2 n, \mathbb{R}) \cap \mathrm{O}(2 n)$ is the stabilizer of a compatible pair $(J, g)$, with $J^2=-I$ and $g(\cdot, \cdot)= \omega(\cdot, J \cdot)$.

The associated bundle
$$\mathcal{J}_\omega:=P_{\mathrm{Sp}} \times_{\mathrm{Sp}(2 n, \mathbb{R})}(\mathrm{Sp}(2 n, \mathbb{R}) / \mathrm{U}(n)) \rightarrow M,$$
whose fiber at $x$ is the set of $\omega_x$-compatible almost complex structures. The homogeneous space $\mathrm{Sp}(2 n, \mathbb{R}) / \mathrm{U}(n)$ is nonempty and contractible.

A reduction $P_{\mathrm{U}} \subset P_{\mathrm{Sp}}$ exists if and only if $\mathcal{J}_\omega$ has a global section. Contractible fiber implies no obstruction classes; a section exists. Its value is a smooth bundle morphism $J: TM \to TM$ with $J^2=-I$ and $\omega(\cdot, J \cdot)$ positive-definite.
