= Kathryn Chaloner =

American statistician

Kathryn M. Chaloner
- Born: August 24, 1954; Crewe, Cheshire, England
- Died: October 19, 2014 (aged 60)
- Education: Carnegie Mellon University; University College London; Somerville College, Oxford
- Scientific career
- Fields: Statistics
- Workplaces: University of Iowa
- Thesis: Optimal Bayesian Experimental Design
- Doctoral advisor: Morris H. DeGroot

Kathryn Mary Chaloner (August 24, 1954 – October 19, 2014) was a British-born American statistician.

Chaloner was a statistics researcher who developed methods in Bayesian experimental design, and well known for her work on HIV/AIDS, infectious diseases, and women's health. She was a board member of the National Alliance for Doctoral Studies in the Mathematical Sciences, a group of faculty working towards inclusion and diversity in the doctoral-level mathematical sciences. She led an initiative in statistical sciences to broaden participation in doctoral-level studies in statistics and biostatistics.

== Biography ==
She earned a bachelor's degree in Mathematics from Oxford University where she studied at Somerville College, and a master's degree in Statistics from the University College London before moving to the United States to study at Carnegie Mellon University, where received a PhD in Statistics.

She was a faculty member of the University of Minnesota School of Statistics from 1982–2002. In 2002, she was appointed Professor and Chair of the Department of Biostatistics at the University of Iowa.

== Honors and awards ==
- Fellow (posthumous) of the Society for Clinical Trials
- Elected Fellow of the American Statistical Association
- Elected Fellow of the International Statistical Institute
- Elected Fellow of the American Association for the Advancement of Science
- COPSS Elizabeth L. Scott Award for contributions to service and leadership, mentoring junior faculty and graduate students, contributions to statistical methodology, and application of cutting edge methods to medicine and public health.
