= Lilya =

Lilya is a female given name. Notable people with this name include:

- Lilya Brik (1891–1978), Russian author
- Lilya Budaghyan, Armenian cryptographer
- Lilya Djenaoui (born 1997), Algerian volleyball player
- Lilya Hadab (born 1999), Moroccan tennis player
- Lilya Horishna (born 1994), Ukrainian freestyle wrestler
- Lilya Zilberstein (born 1965), Russian pianist
