= Bin Yu =

Chinese-American statistician

- 郁彬
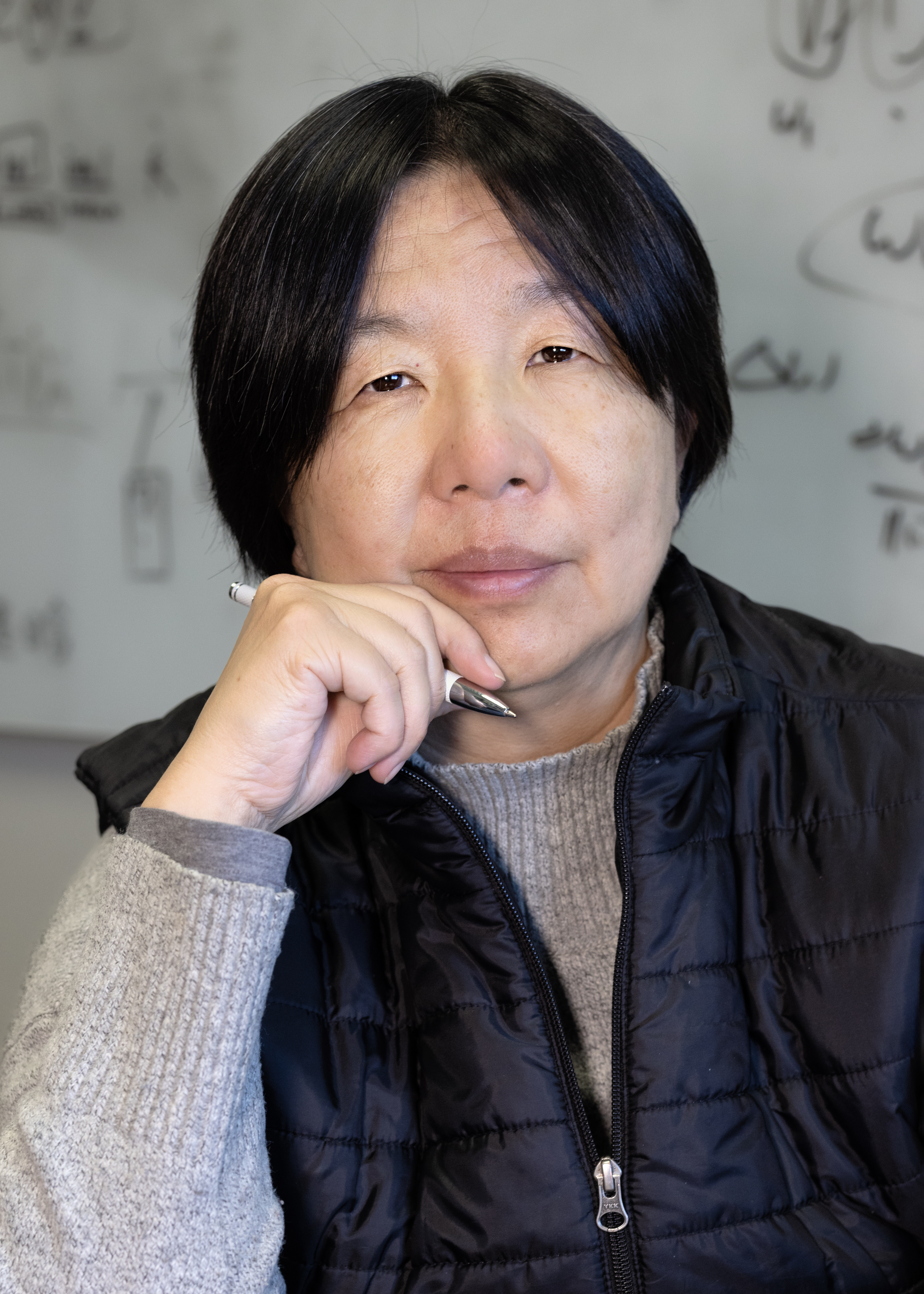
- Education: Peking University (BA, 1984); University of California, Berkeley (MS, 1987; PhD, 1990)
- Awards: IMS Fellow (1999); IEEE Fellow (2001); ASA Fellow (2005); AAAS Fellow (2013); Member of NAS (2014); Elizabeth L. Scott Award (2018); COPSS Distinguished Achievement Award and Lectureship (2023)
- Scientific career
- Fields: Statistics; Machine Learning
- Institutions: University of California, Berkeley; University of Wisconsin–Madison; Bell Labs
- Doctoral advisor: Lucien Le Cam; Terry Speed
- Website: www.stat.berkeley.edu/~binyu/

Bin Yu (Chinese: 郁彬) is a Chinese-American statistician. She is currently Chancellor's Professor in the Departments of Statistics and of Electrical Engineering & Computer Sciences at the University of California, Berkeley.

== Biography ==
Yu earned a bachelor's degree in mathematics in 1984 from Peking University, and went on to pursue graduate studies in statistics at Berkeley, earning a master's degree in 1987 and a Ph.D. in 1990. Her dissertation, Some Results on Empirical Processes and Stochastic Complexity, was jointly supervised by Lucien Le Cam and Terry Speed.

After postdoctoral studies at the Mathematical Sciences Research Institute and an assistant professorship at the University of Wisconsin–Madison, she returned to Berkeley as a faculty member in 1993, was tenured in 1997, and became Chancellor's Professor in 2006. She also worked at Bell Labs from 1998 to 2000, while on leave from Berkeley, and has held visiting positions at several other universities. She chaired the Department of Statistics at Berkeley from 2009 to 2012, and was president of the Institute of Mathematical Statistics in 2014. In 2023, she was awarded the COPSS Distinguished Achievement Award and Lectureship.

== Research ==
Yu's work spans many fields including statistics, machine learning, neuroscience, genomics, and remote sensing. Her recent work has focused on data science, including frameworks for veridical data science and interpretable machine learning. Yu has received recent news coverage regarding investigations into the theoretical foundations of deep learning, and work forecasting COVID-19 severity in the US.

Other research topics include dictionary learning, non-negative matrix factorization (NMF), EM and deep learning (CNNs and LSTMs), and heterogeneous effect estimation in randomized experiments (X-learner).

== Honors and awards ==
Yu is a fellow of the Institute of Mathematical Statistics, the IEEE, the American Statistical Association, the American Association for the Advancement of Science, the American Academy of Arts and Sciences, and the National Academy of Sciences. In 2012, she was the Tukey Lecturer of the Bernoulli Society for Mathematical Statistics and Probability. In 2018, she was awarded the Elizabeth L. Scott Award. She was invited to give the Breiman lecture at NeurIPS 2019 (formally known as NIPS), on the topic of veridical data science. In 2021, she was awarded an honorary doctorate by the University of Lausanne. And in 2023, she received the COPSS distinguished achievement lecture.
