= Linda Hayden =

Linda Hayden may refer to:

- Linda Hayden (actress) (born 1953), English film and television actress
- Linda B. Hayden (born 1949), American mathematician
