= Stephanie Alexander (disambiguation) =

Stephanie Alexander (born 1940) is an Australian chef.

Stephanie Alexander may also refer to:

- Stephanie B. Alexander (1941–2023), American mathematician
- Stevvi Alexander, American singer-songwriter
