= Roderick J. A. Little =

Ph.D. University of London 1974

Roderick J. Little
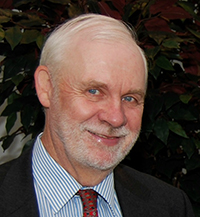
- Roderick J. Little
- Education: University of Cambridge; Imperial College London
- Scientific career
- Fields: Statistics
- Workplaces: USEPA; USCB; George Washington University; University of California, Los Angeles; University of Michigan
- Thesis: Missing Values in Multivariate Statistical Analysis (1974)
- Doctoral advisors: Martin Beale; David Cox

Roderick Joseph Alexander Little is an academic statistician and professor emeritus at the University of Michigan. His main research contributions lie in the statistical analysis of data with missing values and the analysis of complex sample survey data. He held the position of Professor in the Department of Biomathematics at the University of California, Los Angeles. He also served as a Research Fellow at the United States Census Bureau from 1982 to 1983, an Expert Consultant at the United States Environmental Protection Agency, and a Scientific Associate at the World Fertility Survey. Additionally, he was a Research Associate in the Department of Statistics at the University of Chicago.

== Education ==
Little was born near London, England, and attended secondary school at Glasgow Academy in Scotland. He received a BA in Mathematics from Gonville and Caius College, Cambridge University, and an M.Sc. in Statistics and Operational Research and Ph.D. in Statistics at Imperial College of Science and Technology, University of London. His doctoral dissertation was on the analysis of data with missing values, and was supervised by Professors Martin Beale and Sir David R. Cox.

== Career ==
After a two-year post-doc in the Department of Statistics at the University of Chicago in 1974-76, Little worked at the World Fertility Survey from 1976–80, under the leadership of Sir Maurice Kendall. In 1980-82 he joined a group formed by Donald Rubin at the U.S. Environmental Protection Agency in Washington DC, and in 1982-3 he was an ASA/Census/NSF Fellow at the U.S. Census Bureau and an Adjunct Associate Professor at George Washington University. In 1983-93 he was Associate Professor and later Professor in the Department of Biomathematics at UCLA. He was appointed Professor and Chair of the Biostatistics Department at the University of Michigan in 1993 and chaired the department for 11 years between 1993 and 2009, a period of intensive departmental growth. In 2012, The Committee of Presidents of Statistical Societies (COPSS) selected Little as the R.A. Fisher Lecturer for the 2012 Joint Statistics Meetings held in San Diego.

=== Activities in U.S. federal statistics ===
Little is a strong advocate of the importance of independent government statistical agencies for democracy. He served two terms on the Committee on National Statistics of the National Academy of Sciences, and in 2010-12 was the inaugural Associate Director for Survey Research and Methodology and Chief Scientist at the United States Census Bureau, a position that has elevated scientific aspects of Census Bureau operations. He has participated in many National Academy of the Sciences panels, in particular chairing studies on multiple sclerosis and other neurologic disorders in veterans of the Persian Gulf and Post 9/11 wars, and on the treatment of missing data in clinical trials. He has been active in advising the U.S. Food and Drug Administration and pharmaceutical companies on methods for handling missing data in clinical studies.

=== Activities for the American Statistical Association ===
Little served two terms on the Board of Directors of the American Statistical Association (ASA), first as Editorial Representative and then as a Vice President. Editorially, he was Coordinating and Applications Editor of the Journal of the American Statistical Association in 1992-4, and later, as Chair of the Survey Research Methods section of the ASA, helped to start a new academic journal on survey statistics, the Journal of Survey Statistics and Methodology. He served as the Statistics Co-Editor in Chief for that journal in 2016-18. In 2016, Little received a Founder’s Award from the ASA for his contributions to the statistics profession.

== Research ==
Little’s primary research interest is the analysis of data sets with missing values. Many statistical techniques are designed for complete, rectangular data sets, but in practice many data sets contain missing values, either by design or accident. In 1987, Little co-authored a book with Donald Rubin that was one of the earliest systematic treatments of the topic; the 2nd edition was published in 2002 and the 3rd edition in 2019. As detailed in that book, initial statistical approaches to missing values were relatively ad-hoc, such as discarding incomplete cases or substituting means. The main focus of the book is on likelihood-based inferential techniques, such as maximum likelihood and Bayesian inference, based on statistical models for the data and missing-data mechanism. The 1st edition focused mainly on maximum likelihood via the expectation-maximization (EM) algorithm, but later editions emphasize Bayesian methods and the related technique of multiple imputation. Little and Rubin were awarded the prestigious Karl Pearson Prize in 2017 by the International Statistical Institute (ISI), the leading international statistics society, for a research contribution that has had “profound influence on statistical theory, methodology or applications.” The citation for the award was as follows: “The work of Roderick J. Little and Donald B. Rubin, laid out in their seminal 1978 Biometrika papers and 1987 book, updated in 2002, has been no less than defining and transforming. Earlier missing data work was ad hoc at best. Little and Rubin defined the field and provided the methodological and applied communities with a useful and usable taxonomy and a set of key results. Today, their terminology and methodology is used more than ever. Their work has been transforming for the deep impact it had and has on both statistical practice and theory. It is one of the rare topics that has continued for the past thirty years to be studied and developed in academia, government and industry. For example, it plays a key role in the current work on sensitivity analysis with incomplete data.”

=== Missing data research ===
Little’s main methodological contributions to missing-data methods, in collaboration with his students and colleagues, include methods for missing data for mixtures of continuous and categorical data using the general location model, pattern-mixture models for data that are missing not at random, penalized spline of propensity models for missing data and causal inference, subsample ignorable likelihood methods in regression, proxy pattern-mixture models for survey nonresponse, models for longitudinal data, partially missing at random models, and review papers on missing data in regression, hot-deck imputation, and masking data for confidentiality protection.

=== Bayesian analysis of survey data ===
Another research area is the analysis of data collected by complex sampling designs involving stratification and clustering of units. Since working as a statistician for the World Fertility Survey, Little worked on the development of model-based methods for survey analysis that are robust to misspecification, reasonably efficient, and capable of implementation in applied settings. Contributions with students and colleagues in this area include articles on survey nonresponse, Bayesian methods for survey inference, poststratification, assessing selection bias, and survey weighting from a Bayesian perspective.

=== Statistical Inference ===
Little has commented on seminal ideas and controversies in statistics, and advocates the calibrated Bayesian approach to statistical analysis. as proposed by George Box and Donald Rubin, among others. The idea is to develop Bayesian models for analysis that yield Bayesian inferences with good frequentist properties, such as posterior credible intervals that have close to nominal coverage when viewed as confidence intervals in repeated sampling. In the survey sampling arena, this leads to models that incorporate features of the sample design in the Bayesian model. Little argues that this Bayesian framework yields a more unified approach to survey sample inference than the design-based approach, which relies on the randomization distribution underlying sample selection as the basis for inference.

=== Statistical Methods for Estimating Causal Effects ===
Little has contributed to the literature of statistical inference for causal effects based on the Neyman/Rubin causal model, mainly in the context of clinical and epidemiologic research.

=== Applications of Statistics ===
Little's applied interests in statistics are broad, including public health, epidemiology, medical statistics, mental health, environmental statistics, demography, economics, education and the social sciences more generally.

== Awards ==
Little is a Fellow of the American Statistical Association and the American Academy of Arts and Sciences, and a Member of the International Statistical Institute and the U.S. National Academy of Medicine. In 2005 he received the ASA Wilks’ memorial award for contributions to statistics. Plenary talks include the 2005 President’s Invited Address and the 2012 COPSS Fisher Lecture at the Joint Statistical Meetings, and the President’s Invited Address at the 2018 Eastern North American Region Meeting of the International Biometric Society. In 2020 he received the Marvin Zelen Leadership Award in Statistical Science from Harvard University.
