= Emil Artin Junior Prize in Mathematics =

Established in 2001, the Emil Artin Junior Prize in Mathematics is presented usually every year by the Armenian Mathematical Union to a former student of an Armenian university, not more than 10 years after having received a doctoral degree, for outstanding contributions in algebra, geometry, topology, and number theory. The award is announced in the Notices of the American Mathematical Society. The prize is named after Emil Artin, who was of Armenian descent. Although eligibility for the prize is not fully international, as the recipient has to have studied in Armenia, awards are made only for specific outstanding publications in leading international journals.

== Recipient of the Emil Artin Junior Prize ==
- 2001 Vahagn Mikaelian
- 2002 Artur Barkhudaryan
- 2004 Gurgen R. Asatryan
- 2005 Mihran Papikian
- 2007 Ashot Minasyan
- 2008 Nansen Petrosyan
- 2009 Grigor Sargsyan
- 2010 Hrant Hakobyan
- 2011 Lilya Budaghyan
- 2014 Sevak Mkrtchyan
- 2015 Anush Tserunyan
- 2016 Lilit Martirosyan
- 2018 Davit Harutyunyan
- 2019 Vahagn Aslanyan
- 2020 Levon Haykazyan
- 2021 Arman Darbinyan
- 2022 Diana Davidova
- 2023 Davit Karagulyan
- 2024 Aram Nazaryan
- 2025 Liana Yepremyan
- 2026 Lianna Hambardzumyan

== See also ==
- List of mathematics awards
