= Alfred Gray (mathematician) =

American mathematician

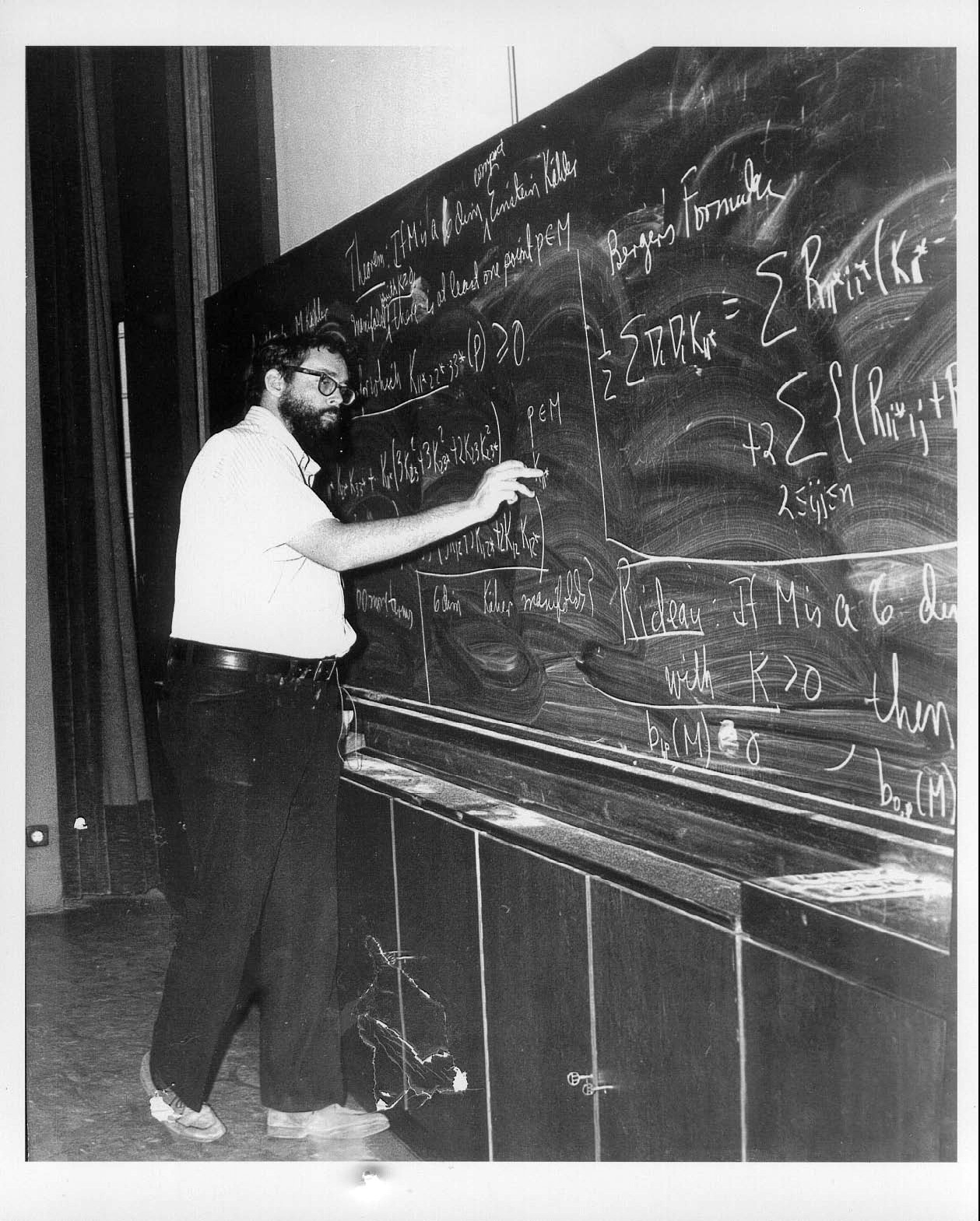
- Alfred Gray in Greece
- Born: October 22, 1939; Dallas
- Died: October 27, 1998 (aged 59)
- Citizenship: American
- Education: University of California, Los Angeles
- Known for: Nearly Kähler manifold
- Spouse: Mary W. Gray
- Scientific career
- Fields: Differential geometry
- Workplaces: University of Maryland, College Park
- Thesis: Minimal Varieties and Kahler Submanifolds (1964)
- Doctoral advisor: Leo Sario, Barrett O'Neill

Alfred Gray (October 22, 1939 – October 27, 1998) was an American mathematician whose main research interests were in differential geometry. He also made contributions in the fields of complex variables and differential equations.

== Short biography ==
Alfred Gray was born in Dallas to Alfred James Gray and Eloise Evans and studied mathematics at the University of Kansas. He received a Ph.D. from the University of California, Los Angeles in 1964. His thesis, entitled Minimal Varieties and Kahler Submanifolds, was written under the supervision of Leo Sario and Barrett O'Neill.

He worked for four years at University of California, Berkeley. From 1970 until his death he was a professor at the University of Maryland, College Park.

He died in Bilbao of a heart attack while working with students in a computer lab at Colegio Mayor Miguel de Unamuno around 4 a.m., on October 27, 1998.

In 2022 the Association for Women in Mathematics has established the Mary and Alfie Gray Award for Social Justice, named after Alfred Gray and his wife Mary W. Gray, in order to support mathematicians working for human rights.

== Mathematical contributions ==
Gray made several contributions in the classification of various types of geometric structures, such as Kähler manifolds and almost Hermitian manifolds. For instance, together with Fernández and Gotay, he provided the first example of a symplectic manifold which does not admit a compatible complex structure, hence cannot be Kähler.

Among other results, Gray introduced the concept of a nearly Kähler manifold, gave topological obstructions to the existence of geometrical structures, and made several contributions in the computation of the volume of tubes and balls, curvature identities, etc.

He published a book on tubes and is the author of two textbooks and over one hundred scientific articles. His books were translated into Spanish, Italian, Russian and German.

Gray was a pioneer in the use of computer graphics in teaching differential geometry (particularly the geometry of curves and surfaces) and of using electronic computation in teaching both differential geometry and ordinary differential equations.
