= Mary W. Gray =

American mathematician, statistician, and lawyer

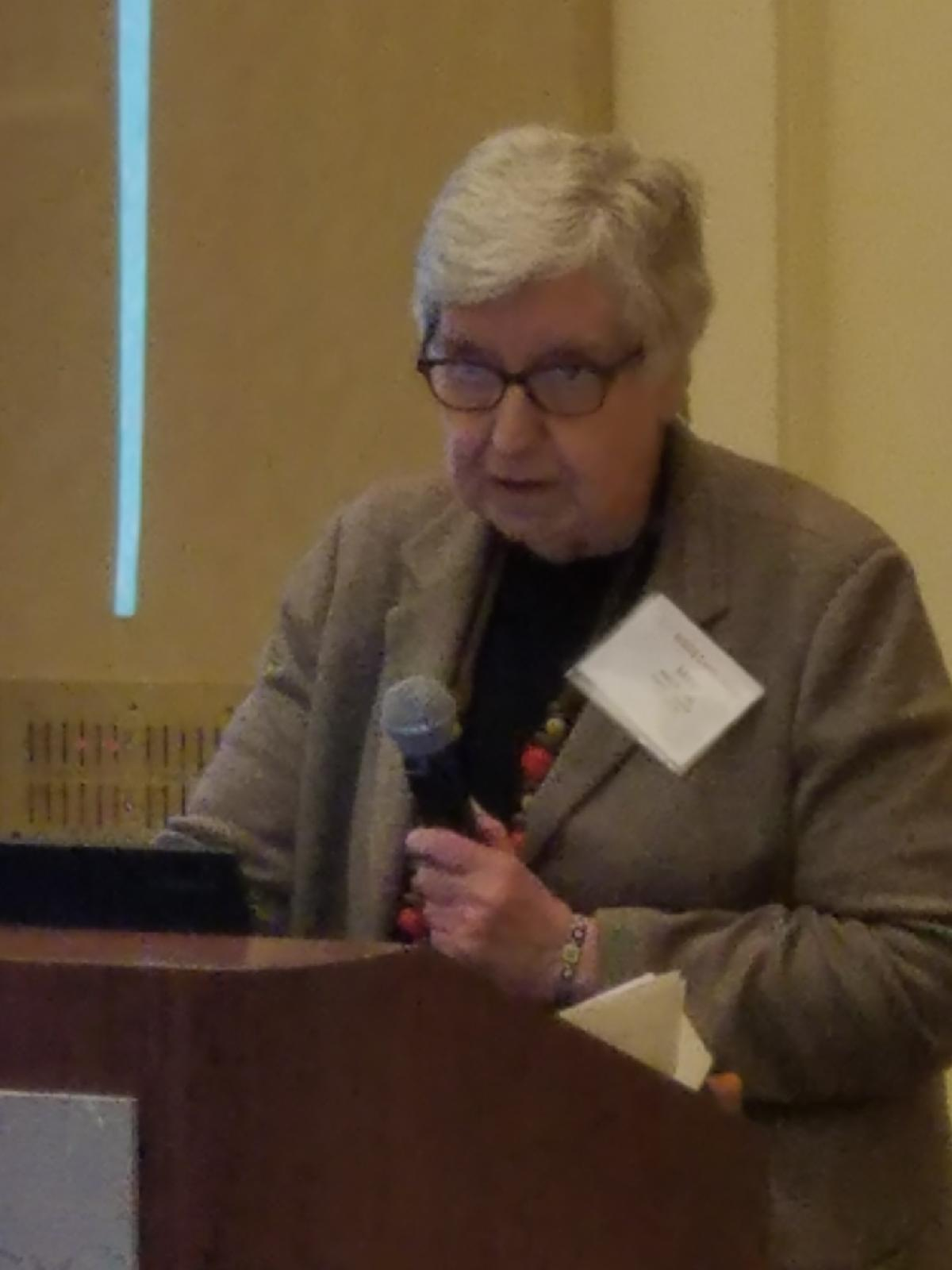
- Presenting at the 2017 Women in Statistics and Data Science Conference in La Jolla, CA
- Born: Mary Lee Wheat; April 8, 1938 (age 88); Hastings, Nebraska
- Citizenship: United States
- Education: University of Kansas
- Spouse: Alfred Gray
- Awards: 2012 Elizabeth L. Scott Award; 2013 Fellow of the American Mathematics Society; 2017 Fellow of the Association for Women in Mathematics; 2017 Karl E. Peace Award for Outstanding Statistical Contributions for the Betterment of Society; 2021 MAA Certificate of Merit
- Scientific career
- Workplaces: American University
- Thesis: Radical Subcategories (1964)
- Academic advisors: William Raymond Scott; Lee Meyers Sonneborn
- Doctoral students: Linda B. Hayden
- Website: https://www.mgray.org/

Mary Lee Wheat Gray (born in Hastings on April 8, 1938) is an American mathematician, statistician, and lawyer. She is the author of books and papers in the fields of mathematics, mathematics education, computer science, applied statistics, economic equity, discrimination law, and academic freedom.

She was founding member and first president of the Association for Women in Mathematics.

== Biography and career ==
Gray completed her undergraduate degree in mathematics in 1959 from Hastings College. Supported by a Fulbright Fellowship, she then studied for one year at Goethe Universität Frankfurt. After she returned to the US she began her graduate studies in mathematics at University of Kansas, where she obtained a MA in 1962 and a Ph.D. in 1964.

She worked later at University of California at Berkeley and at California State University at Hayward. Since 1968 she worked at the American University in Washington. In 1973 she was elected as an AMS Member at Large. She held this position until 1975.

Gray worked closely with her AU colleague, chemist Nina Roscher, to improve resources for women and minorities in mathematics and science and prevent them from dropping classes. They created an apprenticeship program to help show first year female students an interdisciplinary, people-oriented perspective of scientists. The program, funded by a $95,000 grant from the National Science Foundation (NSF) included a seminar course followed by a two-month apprenticeship working with a scientist engaged in science policy work.

Gray completed in 1979 her J.D. from Washington College of Law. She is a member of the District of Columbia and U.S. Supreme Court bars.

She is currently on the Board of Advisers for POMED (Project on Middle East Democracy) and is the chair of the Board of Directors of AMIDEAST (America-Mideast Educational and Training Services, Inc.).

== Role within the Association for Women in Mathematics ==
Gray was one of the founding members of the Association for Women in Mathematics (AWM) and the first President of the AWM from 1971 to 1973. As reported in A Brief History of the Association for Women in Mathematics: The Presidents' Perspectives, by Lenore Blum,

"As Judy Green remembers (and Chandler Davis, early AWM friend, concurs): 'The formal idea of women getting together and forming a caucus was first made publicly at a MAG [Mathematics Action Group] meeting in 1971 ... in Atlantic City. Joanne Darken, then an instructor at Temple University and now at the Community College of Philadelphia, stood up at the meeting and suggested that the women present remain and form a caucus. I have been able to document six women who remained: me (I was a graduate student at Maryland at the time), Joanne Darken, Mary [W.] Gray (she was already at American University), Diane Laison (then an instructor at Temple), Gloria Olive (a Senior Lecturer at the University of Otago, New Zealand, who was visiting the U.S. at the time) and Annie Selden...It's not absolutely clear what happened next, except that I've personally always thought that Mary was responsible for getting the whole thing organized ....'".

Mary W. Gray was the early organizer, placing an advertisement in the February 1971 Notices of the AMS, and writing the first issue of the AWM Newsletter that May. Again as reported by Lenore Blum,

"What I remember hearing about Mary [W.] Gray and the Atlantic City Meetings, indeed what perked my curiosity, was an entirely different event, one that was also to alter dramatically the character of the mathematics community. In those years the AMS was governed by what could only be called an "old boys network," closed to all but those in the inner circle. Mary challenged that by sitting in on the Council meeting in Atlantic City. When she was told she had to leave, she refused saying she would wait until the police came. (Mary relates the story somewhat differently: When she was told she had to leave, she responded she could find no rules in the by-laws restricting attendance at Council meetings. She was then told it was by "gentlemen's agreement." Naturally Mary replied "Well, obviously I'm no gentleman.") After that time, Council meetings were open to observers and the process of democratization of the Society had begun."

== Honors ==
On July 30, 2017, Gray received from the American Statistical Association the Karl E. Peace Award for Outstanding Statistical Contributions for the Betterment of Society (Paul S. Albert, chair) "for the innovative use of statistics for fighting discrimination through the promotion of equality and human rights; for legal advocacy in court cases; and for leadership in multiple societies, including as first president of the Association for Women in Mathematics and chair of the American Middle East Educational and Training Services." This was the spoken citation:

The winners of the 2017 Karl E. Peace award for Outstanding Statistical Contributions for the Betterment of Society reflect ways that statistical thinking in action can make important scientific and societal impact. The first is using statistics to directly inform policy and improve society, and the second is developing new statistical methodology that translates to the betterment of society. Dr. Mary Gray, trained as both a statistician and a lawyer, has made important contributions in the application of statistics in human rights, economic equality, legal issues, and education. She is the founder and first president of the Association for Women in Mathematics and chair of the American Middle East Education and Training Services. Dr. Gray is a fellow of the American Statistical Association and the American Association for the Advancement of Science, and is the recipient of the Presidential Award for Excellence in Science, Engineering and Mathematics Mentoring. She is the author of two books and over eighty articles and has lectured throughout the United States, Europe, Latin America, and the Middle East, on these important topics.

Gray has received the Presidential Award for Excellence in Science, Mathematics and Engineering Mentoring from President George W. Bush. She has also received honorary degrees from the University of Nebraska–Lincoln, Mount Holyoke College, and Hastings College. She is a fellow of the American Mathematical Society, the American Statistical Association, the American Association for the Advancement of Science, and the Association for Women in Science.

In 2017, Gray was selected as a fellow of the Association for Women in Mathematics in the inaugural class. In 2021, she was awarded the MAA Certificate of Merit.

In 2022 the Association for Women in Mathematics has established the Mary and Alfie Gray Award for Social Justice, named after Mary Gray and her late husband Alfred Gray, in order to support mathematicians working for human rights.

== Published works ==
=== Books ===
- Gray, Mary W. (1970). Radical approach to algebra. Reading, Massachusetts: Addison-Wesley Pub. Co. OCLC 80899.
- Gray, Mary W. (1972). Calculus with finite mathematics for social sciences. Reading, Massachusetts: Addison-Wesley Pub. Co. ISBN 9780201025736.

=== Journal articles ===
Gray has published over 80 articles.

- Gray, Mary; Bergmann, Barbara R. (September–October 2003). "Student teaching evaluations: Inaccurate, demeaning, misused". Academe. 89 (5): 44–46. doi:10.2307/40253388. JSTOR 40253388.

== Awards ==
- 1959 Fulbright Fellowship
- 1959-1963 NDEA fellowship
- 1963-1964 NSF fellowship
- 1994 Mentor Award for Lifetime Achievement from the American Association for the Advancement of Science
- 1979 Georgina Smith Award from the American Association of University Professors for her work on the status of women in collective bargaining
- 2001 Presidential Award for Excellence in Science, Mathematics and Engineering Mentoring
- 2012 Elizabeth L. Scott Award from the Committee of Presidents of Statistical Societies
- 2017 Karl E. Peace Award for Outstanding Statistical Contributions for the Betterment of Society

== Memberships ==
- Chair of the Board of Directors of the American Middle East Education Foundation
- Statistics Without Borders
- Co-director of the Patricia Roberts Harris Fellowship program at American University
- President of the Association for Women in Mathematics, 1971–1973
- American Association for the Advancement of Science: Chair of Committee on Scientific Freedom and Responsibility, 1997 - 1999
