= Yoonkyung Lee =

Korean-American computer scientist

- Education: Seoul National University; University of Wisconsin-Madison
- Known for: kernel method dimensionality reduction machine learning
- Scientific career
- Fields: Statistics
- Thesis: Multicategory Support Vector Machines, Theory, and Application to the Classification of Microarray Data and Satellite Radiance Data (2002)
- Doctoral advisor: Grace Wahba

Yoonkyung Lee is a professor of statistics at Ohio State University, and also holds a courtesy appointment in computer science and engineering at Ohio State. Her research takes a statistical approach to kernel methods, dimensionality reduction, and regularization in machine learning.

== Professional career ==
Lee earned bachelor's and master's degrees in computer science and statistics from Seoul National University in Korea in 1994 and 1996. She completed her Ph.D. in statistics in 2002 at the University of Wisconsin–Madison, under the supervision of Grace Wahba and Yi Lin, with a dissertation about support vector machines and their applications to microarray and satellite data. She joined the Ohio State faculty in 2002 and was promoted to full professor in 2016.

== Recognition ==
In 2015, Lee was elected as a Fellow of the American Statistical Association "for fundamental and influential research on the multicategory support vector machine; for work at the edge of statistics and computer science and building a bridge between the statistics and machine learning communities; and for editorial and program committee service to the profession."
