= Hao Helen Zhang =

Chinese statistician

- Education: Peking University; University of Wisconsin–Madison College of Letters and Science
- Scientific career
- Fields: Statistics
- Workplaces: North Carolina State University; University of Arizona

Hao Helen Zhang is a Chinese statistician. She is a professor at the University of Arizona, in the Department of Mathematics, Statistics Interdisciplinary Program, and Applied Mathematics Interdisciplinary Program there. With Bertrand Clarke and Ernest Fokoué, she is the author of the book Principles and Theory for Data Mining and Machine Learning.

Zhang earned a bachelor's degree in mathematics in 1996 from Peking University. She completed her Ph.D. in statistics in 2002 from the University of Wisconsin–Madison. Her dissertation, supervised by Grace Wahba, was Nonparametric Variable Selection and Model Building Via Likelihood Basis Pursuit. She joined the Department of Statistics at North Carolina State University in 2002, and moved to Arizona in 2011.

Zhang was elected to the International Statistical Institute and as a fellow of the American Statistical Association in 2015. She became a fellow in the Institute of Mathematical Statistics in 2016, and has been selected as the 2019 Medallion Lecturer of the Institute of Mathematical Statistics.
