= George Tseng =

Biostatistician

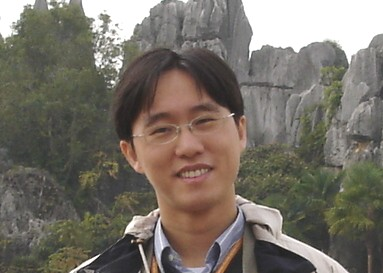
- Born: Chien-Cheng Tseng; 1975 (age 49–50); Taoyuan, Taiwan
- Education: National Taiwan University (BS, MS); Harvard University (DSc)
- Known for: Meta-analysis of Omics data
- Awards: Silver medal prize International Mathematical Olympiad (1993)
- Scientific career
- Fields: Biostatistics; Computational biology
- Institutions: University of Pittsburgh
- Thesis: Low-level Analysis, Supervised and Unsupervised Machine Learning, and Related Issues in Microarray Analysis (2003)
- Doctoral advisor: Wing Hung Wong
- Website: tsenglab.biostat.pitt.edu

George Chien-Cheng Tseng is a Taiwanese biostatistician. He is a professor at the University of Pittsburgh, where he is also the vice chair for research in the departments of biostatistics, computational and systems biology, and human genetics at University of Pittsburgh Graduate School of Public Health.

== Education ==
Tseng graduated from National Taiwan University with a Bachelor of Science (B.S.) in mathematics in 1997 and a Master of Science (M.S.) in mathematics in 1999. He then completed doctoral studies in the United States, earning his Doctor of Science (D.Sc.) in biostatistics from Harvard University in 2003 under the supervision of Wing Hung Wong. His doctoral dissertation was titled, "Low-level analysis, supervised and unsupervised machine learning, and related issues in microarray analysis".

== Research ==
Tseng is leading a research group of Bioinformatics and Statistical learning at University of Pittsburgh. His group focuses on developing Meta-analysis and Machine learning tools to analyze Omics data, which uses resampling methods and Bayesian statistics extensively. Tseng has developed Tight Clustering, a method for cluster genomics data with scattered genes, and Adaptively Weighted Fisher's method, a method for Meta-analysis of studywise p-values with both consensus and differential results.

== Awards and honours ==
Tseng has been awarded a silver medal prize in International Mathematical Olympiad in 1993. He has been awarded Pittsburgh Statistician of the Year in 2017 by Pittsburgh Chapter of the American Statistics Association. He became a fellow of the American Statistical Association in 2017. He is selected as one of the recipients of the Provost's Award for Excellence in Mentoring at University of Pittsburgh in 2019.

== Personal life ==
In 1995, Tseng was Baptized as a Christian in Taipei. He is married and resides in Pittsburgh with six children.
