= MAA Certificate of Merit =

Mathematics award

The MAA Certificate of Merit is awarded at irregular intervals by the Mathematical Association of America for special work or service to mathematics or the broader mathematics community.

== Recipients ==
The recipients of the MAA Certificate of Merit are:

- 1977: Henry M. Cox
- 1978: Samuel L. Greitzer
- 1978: Murray S. Klamkin
- 1978: Nura D. Turner
- 1983: Hope Daly
- 1986: Raoul Hailpern
- 1988: Walter E. Mientka
- 1994: I. Edward Block
- 2021: Mary W. Gray

== See also ==
- List of mathematics awards
