= Richard L. Bishop =

American mathematician (1931–2019)

- Born: August 12, 1931; Allegan, Michigan, US
- Died: December 18, 2019 (aged 88); Urbana, Illinois, US
- Education: Massachusetts Institute of Technology; Case Institute of Technology
- Scientific career
- Fields: Mathematics
- Workplaces: University of Illinois at Urbana–Champaign
- Doctoral advisor: Isadore Singer
- Doctoral students: Stephanie B. Alexander
- Website: http://www.math.uiuc.edu/~bishop/

Richard Lawrence Bishop (August 12, 1931 – December 18, 2019) was an American mathematician who specialized in differential geometry and taught at the University of Illinois at Urbana–Champaign.

Bishop went to Case Institute of Technology as an undergraduate, earning a B.S. in 1954. Next he earned his Ph.D. from the Massachusetts Institute of Technology in 1959, and immediately joined the UIUC faculty, where he stayed until his retirement in 1997. His thesis, On Imbeddings and Holonomy, was supervised by Isadore Singer. At UIUC, his doctoral students included future UIUC colleague Stephanie B. Alexander. He is the author of Geometry of Manifolds (with Richard J. Crittenden, AMS Chelsea Publishing, 1964, translated into Russian 1967 and reprinted 2001) and Tensor Analysis on Manifolds (with Samuel I. Goldberg, Macmillan, 1968, reprinted by Dover Books on Mathematics, 1980).

In 2013, Bishop became one of the inaugural fellows of the American Mathematical Society.

The Bishop–Gromov inequality in Riemannian geometry, one form of which appeared in his book with Crittenden, is named after him and Mikhail Gromov, who gave an improved formulation of Bishop's result. He introduced the "Bishop frame" of curves in Euclidean space, an alternative to the better-known Frenet frame. With Barrett O'Neill he made foundational contributions to the study of convex functions and convex sets in Riemannian geometry and their applications in the study of negative sectional curvature, including to the geometry of warped products.

== Notable publications ==
- R.L. Bishop and B. O'Neill. Manifolds of negative curvature. Trans. Amer. Math. Soc. 145 (1969), 1–49. doi:10.2307/1995057; doi:10.1090/S0002-9947-1969-0251664-4
- Richard L. Bishop. There is more than one way to frame a curve. Amer. Math. Monthly 82 (1975), 246–251. doi:10.2307/2319846
- Richard L. Bishop and Richard J. Crittenden. Geometry of manifolds. Reprint of the 1964 original. AMS Chelsea Publishing, Providence, RI, 2001. xii+273 pp. ISBN 0-8218-2923-8; doi:10.1090/chel/344
