= Elizabeth Scott (mathematician) =

American mathematician (1917–1988)

- Born: November 23, 1917; Fort Sill, Oklahoma
- Died: December 20, 1988 (aged 71)
- Education: University of California, Berkeley
- Awards: Newcomb Cleveland Prize (1958)
- Scientific career
- Fields: Mathematics
- Workplaces: University of California, Berkeley
- Doctoral advisor: Robert Julius Trumpler

Elizabeth Leonard Scott (November 23, 1917 – December 20, 1988) was an American mathematician specializing in statistics.

Scott was born in Fort Sill, Oklahoma. Her family moved to Berkeley, California when she was 4 years old. She attended the University of California, Berkeley where she studied astronomy. She earned her Ph.D. in 1949 in astronomy, and received a permanent position in the Department of Mathematics at Berkeley in 1951.

She wrote over 30 papers on astronomy and 30 on weather modification research analysis, incorporating and expanding the use of statistical analyses in these fields. She also used statistics to promote equal opportunities and equal pay for female academics.

In 1957 Scott noted a bias in the observation of galaxy clusters. She noticed that for an observer to find a very distant cluster, it must contain brighter-than-normal galaxies and must also contain a large number of galaxies. She proposed a correction formula to adjust for (what came to be known as) the Scott effect.

Scott was a Fellow of the Institute of Mathematical Statistics. The Committee of Presidents of Statistical Societies awards a prize in her honor, the Elizabeth L. Scott Award, for "fostering opportunities in statistics for women".
