= Riemannian submersion =

In differential geometry, a branch of mathematics, a Riemannian submersion is a submersion from one Riemannian manifold to another that respects the metrics, meaning that it is an orthogonal projection on tangent spaces.

== Formal definition ==
Let (M, g) and (N, h) be two Riemannian manifolds and $f:M\to N$ a (surjective) submersion, i.e., a fibered manifold. The horizontal distribution $\mathrm{ker}(df)^{\perp}$ is a sub-bundle of the tangent bundle of $TM$ which depends both on the projection $f$ and on the metric $g$. The expression $\mathrm{ker}(df)^{\perp}$ denotes the subbundle of $TM$ that is the orthogonal complement of $\mathrm{ker}(df_x) \sub T_{x}M$ at each point x of M.

Then, f is called a Riemannian submersion if and only if, for all $x\in M$, the vector space isomorphism $(df)_x : \mathrm{ker}(df_x)^{\perp} \rightarrow T_{f(x)}N$ is an isometry, or in other words it carries each vector to one of the same length.

== Examples ==
An example of a Riemannian submersion arises when a Lie group $G$ acts isometrically, freely and properly on a Riemannian manifold $(M,g)$. The projection $\pi: M \rightarrow N$ to the quotient space $N = M /G$ equipped with the quotient metric is a Riemannian submersion. For example, component-wise multiplication on $S^3 \subset \mathbb{C}^2$ by the group of unit complex numbers yields the Hopf fibration.

== Properties ==
The sectional curvature of the target space of a Riemannian submersion can be calculated from the curvature of the total space by O'Neill's formula, named for Barrett O'Neill:

$$K_N(X,Y)=K_M(\tilde X, \tilde Y)+\tfrac34|[\tilde X,\tilde Y]^V|^2$$

where $X,Y$ are orthonormal vector fields on $N$, $\tilde X, \tilde Y$ their horizontal lifts to $M$, $[*,*]$ is the Lie bracket of vector fields and $Z^V$ is the projection of the vector field $Z$ to the vertical distribution.

In particular the lower bound for the sectional curvature of $N$ is at least as big as the lower bound for the sectional curvature of $M$.

== Generalizations and variations ==
- Fiber bundle
- Submetry
- co-Lipschitz map

== See also ==
- Fibered manifold
- Geometric topology
- Manifold
