= Wing Hung Wong =

Chinese-American statistician and computational biologist

- Education: University of California, Berkeley; University of Wisconsin-Madison
- Scientific career
- Thesis: An Analysis of the Volume Matching Problem and Related Topics in Smooth Density Estimation (1980)
- Doctoral advisor: Grace Wahba
- Notable students: Jun S. Liu; George Tseng

Wing Hung Wong (Chinese: 王永雄) is a Chinese-American statistician, computational biologist, and Stanford University professor.

== Biography ==
Wong graduated from the University of California, Berkeley in 1976 with a bachelor's degree. At the University of Wisconsin–Madison, he studied under renowned statistician Grace Wahba, and was awarded a PhD in Statistics in 1980. After graduation, he taught at the University of Chicago, served as an assistant professor, associate professor, and professor. In 1994 he joined the Chinese University of Hong Kong Department of Statistics. Since 1997, he taught and led his lab at the University of California, Los Angeles and Harvard University. In 2004, he was appointed Professor at Stanford University, and served as Head of the Department of Statistics at Stanford University in 2009. As of 2020, he is Professor of Statistics and Biomedical Data Science at Stanford.

His students include George Tseng at University of Pittsburgh, Rick Chappell at University of Wisconsin–Madison, and Jun S. Liu at Harvard University.

== Honors and awards ==
Wong is a fellow of National Academy of Sciences in the United States and Academia Sinica (2010). He won the highest award in the field of Statistics COPSS Presidents' Award in 1993. In 2021 he was awarded the COPSS Distinguished Achievement Award and Lectureship.

== Selected publications ==
- "The Calculation of Posterior Distributions by Data Augmentation". Journal of the American Statistical Association. 82(398): 528-540. 1987.
- "Evolutionary Monte Carlo: Applications to C_{p} Model Sampling and Change Point Problem". Statistica Sinica. 10: 317-342. 2000.
