= Grace Wahba =

American statistician

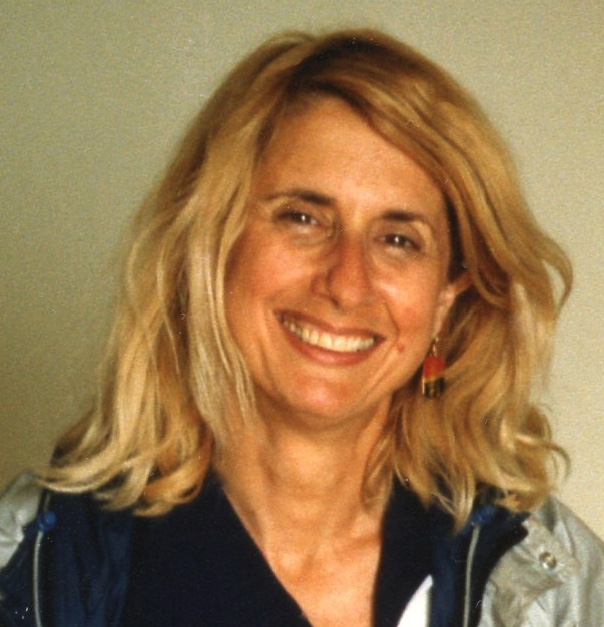
- Wahba in 1986
- Born: August 3, 1934 (age 92)
- Education: Stanford University; University of Maryland, College Park; Cornell University
- Known for: generalized cross validation, smoothing splines
- Scientific career
- Fields: Mathematics, statistics, machine learning
- Workplaces: University of Wisconsin–Madison
- Thesis: Cross Spectral Distribution Theory for Mixed Spectra and Estimation of Prediction Filter Coefficients
- Doctoral advisor: Emanuel Parzen
- Doctoral students: Wing Hung Wong; Yoonkyung Lee; Hao Helen Zhang
- Website: http://www.stat.wisc.edu/~wahba/

Grace Goldsmith Wahba (born August 3, 1934) is an American statistician and retired I. J. Schoenberg-Hilldale Professor of Statistics at the University of Wisconsin–Madison. She is a pioneer in methods for smoothing noisy data. Best known for the development of generalized cross-validation and "Wahba's problem", she has developed methods with applications in demographic studies, machine learning, DNA microarrays, risk modeling, medical imaging, and climate prediction.

== Biography ==
Wahba had an interest in science from an early age, when she was in junior high she was given a chemistry set. At this time she was also interested in becoming an engineer.

Wahba studied at Cornell University for her undergraduate degree; in 1952, Cornell and Brown University were the only Ivy League universities that admitted women. When she was there women were severely restricted in their privileges, for example she was required to live in a dorm and had a curfew. She received her bachelor's degree from Cornell University in 1956 and a master's degree from the University of Maryland, College Park in 1962. She worked in industry for several years before receiving her doctorate from Stanford University in 1966 and settling in Madison in 1967.

She is the author of Spline Models for Observational Data. She retired in August 2018 from the University of Wisconsin-Madison. Her life and career are discussed in interviews in 2007, 2018, and 2020.

== Honors and awards ==
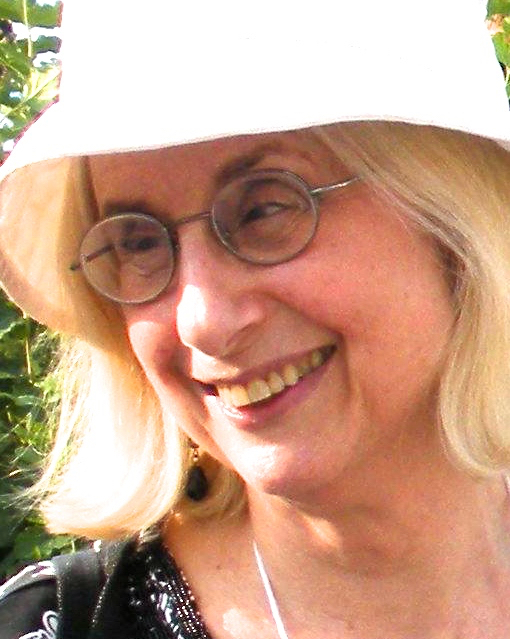
Wahba in 2010

Wahba was elected to the American Academy of Arts and Sciences in 1997 and to the National Academy of Sciences in 2000. She is also a fellow of several academic societies including the American Association for the Advancement of Science, the American Statistical Association, and the Institute of Mathematical Statistics.

Over the years she has received a selection of notable awards in the statistics community:

- International Prize in Statistics, 2025
- R. A. Fisher Lectureship, COPSS, August 2014
- Gottfried E. Noether Senior Researcher Award, Joint Statistics Meetings, August 2009
- Committee of Presidents of Statistical Societies Elizabeth Scott Award, 1996
- First Emanuel and Carol Parzen Prize for Statistical Innovation, 1994

She received honorary Doctor of Science degrees from the University of Chicago in 2007 and The Ohio State University in 2022.

The Institute of Mathematical Statistics announced the IMS Grace Wahba Award and Lecture in 2021.
