= Regina Liu =

American statistician

- Awards: Elizabeth L. Scott award (2024)

Regina Y. Liu is an American statistician. She is a distinguished professor of statistics and chair of the Department of Statistics and Biostatistics at Rutgers University. Her research concerns robust statistics and nonparametric statistics, including the first formulation of simplicial depth.^{[PNAS]}^{[AS90]}

Liu earned her Ph.D. in statistics from Columbia University in 1983, under the supervision of John Raphael Van Ryzin, and joined the Rutgers faculty at that time. She became a distinguished professor at Rutgers in 2001, and department chair in 2005.

Liu became a Fellow of the American Statistical Association in 2005. She is also a fellow of the Institute of Mathematical Statistics.

== Selected publications ==
AS88.	Liu, Regina Y. (1988), "Bootstrap procedures under some non-i.i.d. models", Annals of Statistics, 16 (4): 1696–1708, Bibcode:1988AnSta..1651062L, doi:10.1214/aos/1176351062, MR 0964947

PNAS.	Liu, Regina Y. (1988), "On a notion of simplicial depth", Proceedings of the National Academy of Sciences of the United States of America, 85 (6): 1732–1734, Bibcode:1988PNAS...85.1732L, doi:10.1073/pnas.85.6.1732, MR 0930658, PMC 279852, PMID 16578830

AS90.	Liu, Regina Y. (1990), "On a notion of data depth based on random simplices", Annals of Statistics, 18 (1): 405–414, Bibcode:1990AnSta..1847507L, doi:10.1214/aos/1176347507, MR 1041400

ELB.	Liu, Regina Y.; Singh, Kesar (1992), "Moving blocks jackknife and bootstrap capture weak dependence", Exploring the limits of bootstrap (East Lansing, MI, 1990), Wiley Ser. Probab. Math. Statist. Probab. Math. Statist., New York: Wiley, pp. 225–248, MR 1197787

AS99.	Liu, Regina Y.; Parelius, Jesse M.; Singh, Kesar (1999), "Multivariate analysis by data depth: descriptive statistics, graphics and inference", Annals of Statistics, 27 (3): 783–858, doi:10.1214/aos/1018031260, MR 1724033
