= Nearly Kähler manifold =

In mathematics, a nearly Kähler manifold is an almost Hermitian manifold $M$, with almost complex structure $J$, such that the (2,1)-tensor $\nabla J$ is skew-symmetric. So,

$$(\nabla_X J)X =0$$

for every vector field $X$ on $M$.

In particular, a Kähler manifold is nearly Kähler. The converse is not true. For example, the nearly Kähler six-sphere $S^6$ is an example of a nearly Kähler manifold that is not Kähler. The familiar almost complex structure on the six-sphere is not induced by a complex atlas on $S^6$. Usually, non Kählerian nearly Kähler manifolds are called "strict nearly Kähler manifolds".

Nearly Kähler manifolds, also known as almost Tachibana manifolds, were studied by Shun-ichi Tachibana in 1959 and then by Alfred Gray from 1970 on. For example, it was proved that any 6-dimensional strict nearly Kähler manifold is an Einstein manifold and has vanishing first Chern class (in particular, this implies spin). In the 1980s, strict nearly Kähler manifolds obtained a lot of consideration because of their relation to Killing spinors: Thomas Friedrich and Ralf Grunewald showed that a 6-dimensional Riemannian manifold admits a Riemannian Killing spinor if and only if it is nearly Kähler. This was later given a more fundamental explanation by Christian Bär, who pointed out that these are exactly the 6-manifolds for which the corresponding 7-dimensional Riemannian cone has holonomy G_{2}.

The only compact simply connected 6-manifolds known to admit strict nearly Kähler metrics are $S^6,\mathbb{C}\mathbb{P}^3, \mathbb{P}(T\mathbb{CP}_2)$, and $S^3\times S^3$. Each of these admits such a unique nearly Kähler metric that is also homogeneous, and these examples are in fact the only compact homogeneous strictly nearly Kähler 6-manifolds. However, Foscolo and Haskins recently showed that $S^6$ and $S^3\times S^3$ also admit strict nearly Kähler metrics that are not homogeneous.

Bär's observation about the holonomy of Riemannian cones might seem to indicate that the nearly-Kähler condition is most natural and interesting in dimension 6. This actually borne out by a theorem of Nagy, who proved that any strict, complete nearly Kähler manifold is locally a Riemannian product of homogeneous nearly Kähler spaces, twistor spaces over quaternion-Kähler manifolds, and 6-dimensional nearly Kähler manifolds.

Nearly Kähler manifolds are also an interesting class of manifolds admitting a metric connection with parallel totally antisymmetric torsion.

Nearly Kähler manifolds should not be confused with almost Kähler manifolds. An almost Kähler manifold $M$ is an almost Hermitian manifold with a closed Kähler form: $d\omega = 0$. The Kähler form or fundamental 2-form $\omega$ is defined by

$$\omega(X,Y) = g(JX,Y),$$

where $g$ is the metric on $M$. The nearly Kähler condition and the almost Kähler condition are essentially exclusive: an almost Hermitian manifold is both nearly Kähler and almost Kähler if and only if it is Kähler.
