= Stephanie B. Alexander =

American mathematician (1941–2023)

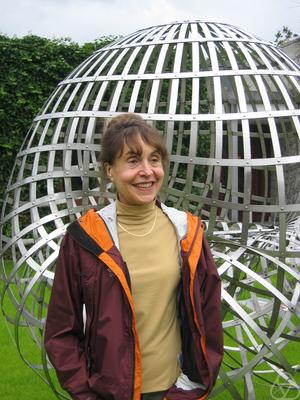
Stephanie Alexander at Oberwolfach.

Stephanie Brewster Brewer Taylor Alexander (September 1, 1941 – November 20, 2023) was an American mathematician, a professor of mathematics at the University of Illinois at Urbana–Champaign. Her research concerned differential geometry and metric spaces.

== Biography ==
Alexander was born in Los Angeles and raised in Vancouver, British Columbia, and London, Ontario. She was a graduate of Mount Holyoke College.

She earned her Ph.D. from UIUC in 1967, under the supervision of Richard L. Bishop, with a thesis entitled Reducibility of Euclidean Immersions of Low Codimensions. After joining the UIUC faculty as a half-time instructor, she became a regular faculty member in 1972. She retired in 2009 and died in 2023.

== Mathematical Work ==
Alexander's most significant achievements were in relation to the study of metric spaces with curvature bounds. Of particular importance was her work with Bishop to establish a concept of curvature bounds in the style of Alexandrov geometry for semi-Riemannian manifolds and Lorentzian manifolds, an early step towards the development of synthetic geometry in a Lorentzian setting.

== Books ==
- With Vitali Kapovitch and Anton Petrunin, Alexander authored the book An Invitation to Alexandrov Geometry: CAT(0) Spaces (Springer, 2019).
- S. Alexander, V. Kapovitch, A. Petrunin. Alexandrov geometry—foundations. — AMS, 2024. — (Grad. Stud. Math. 236).

== Recognition ==
- At Illinois, Alexander won the Luckman Distinguished Undergraduate Teaching Award and the William Prokasy Award for Excellence in Undergraduate Teaching in 1993.
- In 2014 she was elected as a fellow of the American Mathematical Society "for contributions to geometry, for high-quality exposition, and for exceptional teaching of mathematics."
