= Armenian Mathematical Union =

Mathematical society in Armenia

- Հայկական Մաթեմատիկական Միություն
- Abbreviation: AMU, ՀՄՄ
- Formation: 1991; 35 years ago
- Type: Mathematical society
- Headquarters: Yerevan State University
- Location: Armenia
- President: Yuri Movsisyan
- Award: Emil Artin Junior Prize
- Website: amu.sci.am

The Armenian Mathematical Union or AMU (Armenian: Հայկական Մաթեմատիկական Միություն, ՀՄՄ) is a mathematical society founded in Armenia in 1991. The AMU is based in Yerevan, and has been a member of the European Mathematical Society since 2016. It is recognised by the International Mathematics Union as the official mathematical society of Armenia.

== History ==
The first association of Armenian mathematicians was formed in 1920, during the First Armenian Republic; its president was Ervand Kogbetlianz, a professor at Yerevan State University. The modern Armenian Mathematical Union was founded in 1991, the same year that Armenia gained independence due to the dissolution of the USSR. In 2020 the AMU dedicated its annual session to the 100th anniversary of the first association.

== Activities and awards ==
The AMU has organised several international conferences. In May–June 2018 it hosted a conference to celebrate the 120th anniversary of Emil Artin's birth.

Since 2001 the AMU has annually awarded the Emil Artin Junior Prize in Mathematics to a mathematician under the age of thirty-five who studied in Armenia, for "outstanding contributions in algebra, geometry, topology, and number theory." The prize is named after Emil Artin. The winner is announced in the Notices of the American Mathematical Society, and as of 2024 receives a cash prize of US$1400.

== Presidents ==
The Armenian Mathematical Union has had 7 presidents since its founding.

- Alexander Talalyan (1991–1994)
- Norayr Arakelian (1994–1997)
- Ruben Ambartzumian (1997–2001)
- Norayr Yengibaryan (2001–2004)
- Hrachik Hayrapetyan (2004–2011)
- Tigran Harutunyan (2011–2017)
- Yuri Movsisyan (2017–present)

== See also ==
- List of mathematical societies
