= Marisa Fernández =

Spanish mathematician

María Luisa (Marisa) Fernández Rodríguez
- Born: 11 June 1953; Ourense
- Died: 18 November 2025 (aged 72)
- Education: University of Santiago de Compostela
- Scientific career
- Fields: Differential geometry
- Workplaces: University of the Basque Country
- Thesis: Estructura y propiedades de las variedades G1 (1976)
- Doctoral advisor: Enrique Vidal Abascal

María Luisa (Marisa) Fernández Rodríguez (11 June 1953 - 18 November 2025) was a Spanish mathematician specializing in differential geometry, symplectic geometry, and G_{2}-structures. She was professor of geometry and topology in the department of mathematics at the University of the Basque Country.

== Education and career ==
Fernández was originally from Ourense. She was a mathematics student at the University of Santiago de Compostela, earning a licentiate there in 1974 and completing her doctorate in 1976. Her dissertation, Estructura y propiedades de las variedades G1, was supervised by Enrique Vidal Abascal.

After postdoctoral research with Alfred Gray at the University of Maryland, College Park, she joined the faculty of science at the University of the Basque Country in 1986.

She died on 18 November 2025.

== Recognition ==
In 1988, the government of the Province of Pontevedra gave Fernández the Antonio Odriozola Prize for basic research. She was a 2019 winner of the medal of the Royal Spanish Mathematical Society.

== Research ==
Fernández made influential contributions to differential and symplectic geometry, often working at the interface with topology.

Together with Gray and Gotay, she provided the first example of a symplectic manifold which does not admit a compatible complex structure, hence cannot be Kähler.

Together with Vicente Muñoz, she resolved a question posed by Babenko and Taimanov by providing the first example of a compact, simply connected symplectic manifold that is nonformal in the sense of rational homotopy theory. Their construction has become a landmark result in symplectic topology and significantly advanced the understanding of the homotopical properties of symplectic manifolds.
