= Bhramar Mukherjee =

Indian-American biostatistician, data scientist

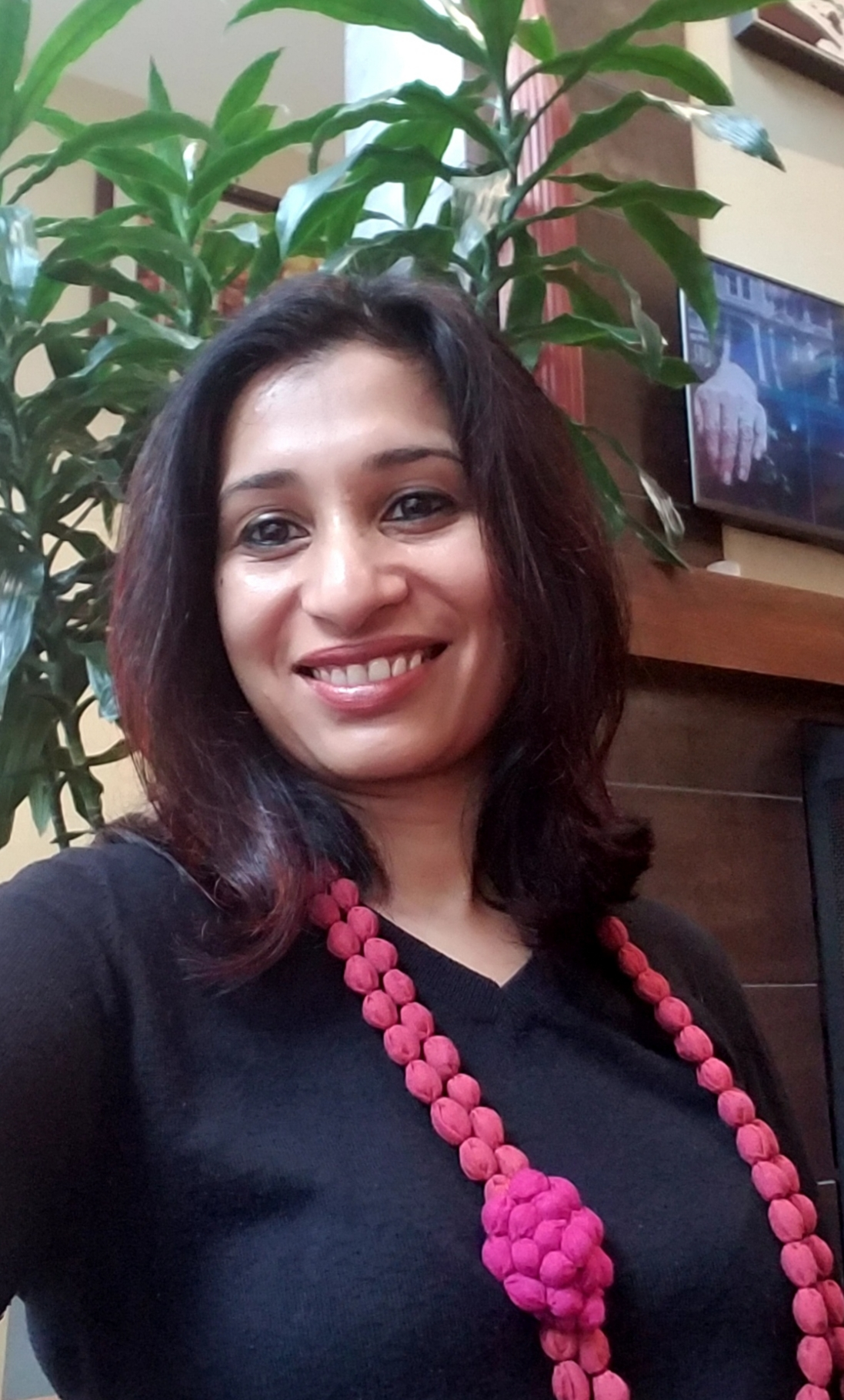
- Born: Kolkata, India
- Occupations: Biostatistician, data scientist, professor and researcher.
- Title: Anna MR Lauder Professor of Biostatistics

Academic background
- Education: [Scottish Church College]https://www.scottishchurch.ac.in/ Presidency College (BSc); Indian Statistical Institute (M.Stat); Purdue University (MS, PhD)
- Thesis: Optimal designs for estimating the path of a stochastic process. (2001)
- Doctoral advisor: William J. Studden

Academic work
- Institutions: University of Michigan Yale University

Bhramar Mukherjee is an Indian-American biostatistician, data scientist, professor and researcher. She is the Anna MR Lauder Professor of Biostatistics at Yale University.

Mukherjee's research has been focused on the development and application of statistical methods in epidemiology, environmental health and disease risk assessment.

Mukherjee is a fellow of the American Statistical Association, the Institute of Mathematical Statistics and the American Association for the Advancement of Science. She is an elected member of the International Statistical Institute and the National Academy of Medicine.

== Education ==
Mukherjee was born and raised in Kolkata, India. She received her B.Sc. in statistics from Presidency College in Kolkata in 1994 and her M. Stat from Indian Statistical Institute in 1996. In the late 1990s, she moved to the United States, where she received her M.S. in mathematical statistics in 1999 and then her Ph.D. in statistics in 2001, both from Purdue University.

== Career ==
After completing her Ph.D., Mukherjee joined University of Florida as an assistant professor of Statistics and taught there until 2006, when she left to join the University of Michigan as the John G. Searle Assistant Professorship. She became associate professor in 2009, full professor in 2013 and was awarded the John D. Kalbfleisch Collegiate Professorship at the University of Michigan in 2015. She was appointed the associate chair of Department of Biostatistics at University of Michigan in 2014 and became the first woman chair of the department in 2018.

In 2016, Mukherjee was appointed the associate director of cancer control and population studies at University of Michigan Rogel Cancer Center. She became the newly appointed associate director for Quantitative Data Sciences in 2019.

In 2024, Mukherjee left University of Michigan to join Yale University, where she was appointed the Anna MR Lauder Professor of Biostatistics and the inaugural Senior Associate Dean of Public Health Data Science and Data Equity at the Yale School of Public Health.

Mukherjee was announced as president-elect for Eastern North American Region (ENAR) of the International Biometric Society (IBS) in 2025.

== Research and work ==
Mukherjee's research has primarily focused on the development and application of statistical methods in epidemiology, analysis of observational data and disease risk assessment.

One of the focal points of Mukherjee's research is to understand how the interaction between genes and environment increases or decreases cancer risk. In this area, she has studied how lifestyle factors such as diet and physical activity coupled with the genetic makeup of an individual impact their cancer risk. In 2018, Mukherjee and her colleagues conducted a phenome-wide association study to see if the polygenic risk scores for different cancers are associated with multiple phenotypes. Their study showed that polygenic risk scores can help in stratifying the risk of different cancers in patients.

During the COVID-19 pandemic, Mukherjee and her study team worked on modeling the transmission of the SARS-CoV-2 virus in India.

== Awards and honors ==
- 2011 – Elected member, The International Statistical Institute
- 2012 – Fellow, American Statistical Association
- 2016 – Gertrude Cox Award, Washington Statistical Society
- 2017 – Fellow of the American Association for the Advancement of Science
- 2022 – Elected member, The National Academy of Medicine.
- 2023 – Karl E Peace Award for statistical contribution towards betterment of society awarded by the American Statistical Association
- 2023 – Jerome Sacks award for outstanding cross-disciplinary research awarded by the National Institute of Statistical Sciences
- 2023 – John D Kalbfleisch Distinguished University Professorship, University of Michigan
- 2024 – Marvin Zelen Award for Leadership in Statistical Sciences, Harvard Biostatistics
- 2024 – Overseas Fellow, Churchill College, University of Cambridge.
- 2025 – Elected fellow, Institute of Mathematical Statistics
- 2025 – Elected member, Connecticut Academy of Science and Engineering

== Selected articles ==
- Sinha, S.; Mukherjee, B.; Ghosh, M.; Mallick, B. K.; Raymond, J. C. (2005). "Bayesian semi-parametric analysis of matched case-control studies with missing exposure". Journal of the American Statistical Association. 100: 591–601. doi:10.1198/016214504000001411.
- Mukherjee, B.; Chatterjee, N. (2008). "Exploiting gene-environment independence for analysis of case-control studies: An empirical-Bayes type shrinkage estimator to trade off between bias and efficiency". Biometrics. 64 (3): 685–694. doi:10.1111/j.1541-0420.2007.00953.x. PMID 18162111.
- Kastrinos, F.; Mukherjee, B.; Tayob, N.; Sparr, J.; Raymond, V. M.; Wang, F.; Bandipalliam, P.; Stoffel, E. M.; Gruber, S. B.; Syngal, S. (2009). "The Risk of Pancreatic Cancer in Lynch Syndrome". Journal of the American Medical Association. 302 (16): 1790–1795. doi:10.1001/jama.2009.1529. PMC 4091624. PMID 19861671.
- Mukherjee, B.; DeLancey, J. O.; Raskin, L. (2012). "Risk of Non-Melanoma Cancers in CDKN2A Mutation Carriers". Journal of the National Cancer Institute. 104 (12): 953–956. doi:10.1093/jnci/djs221. PMC 3379723. PMID 22534780.
- Chen, C.; Haupert, S. R.; Zimmermann, L.; Shi, X.; Fritsche, L. G.; Mukherjee, B. (November 2022). "Global Prevalence of Post-Coronavirus Disease 2019 (COVID-19) Condition or Long COVID: A Meta-Analysis and Systematic Review". Journal of Infectious Diseases. 226 (9): 1593–1607. doi:10.1093/infdis/jiac136. PMC 9047189. PMID 35429399.
- Beesley, L. J.; Mukherjee, B. (2022). "Statistical inference for association studies using electronic health records: handling both selection bias and outcome misclassification". Biometrics. 78 (1): 214–226. doi:10.1111/biom.13400. hdl:2027.42/172018. PMID 33179768.
- Kundu, R.; Shi, X.; Morrison, J.; Barrett, J.; Mukherjee, B. (May 2024). "A framework for understanding selection bias in real-world healthcare data". Journal of the Royal Statistical Society Series A: Statistics in Society. 187 (3): 606–635. doi:10.1093/jrsssa/qnae039. PMC 11393555. PMID 39281782.
