= Linda B. Hayden =

American mathematician

Linda Bailey Hayden (born February 4, 1949) is an American mathematician. She specializes in mathematics education and applications of mathematics in geoscience, and is known for her mentorship of minorities and women in science, technology, engineering, and mathematics. She is a professor and associate dean of mathematics and computer science at Elizabeth City State University.

== Education ==
Hayden is originally from Portsmouth, Virginia. She grew up interested in mathematics, but because of segregation she could only read mathematics books from the Colored Community Library in Portsmouth by specially requesting them to be transferred from the town's main library. She attended the public schools in Portsmouth, including I. C. Norcom High School. Through her participation in high school mathematics competitions, she won a scholarship to Virginia State University, a historically black university.

She graduated from Virginia State in 1970, with a bachelor's degree in mathematics and physics, and earned a master's degree in mathematics education from the University of Cincinnati in 1972. She completed a second master's degree in 1983 in computer science at Old Dominion University.

After this work she returned to graduate study in mathematics education, with Winson R. Coleman and Mary W. Gray at American University. She completed her Ph.D. there in 1988; her dissertation was The Impact of an Intervention Program for High Ability Minority Students on Rates of High School Graduation, College Enrollment, and Choice of a Quantitative Major.

== Career ==
After earning her first master's degree in 1972, Hayden joined the mathematics department at Kentucky State University as an assistant professor. She moved to Norfolk State University in 1976, and again to Elizabeth City State University in 1980. At Elizabeth City State University, she founded the Center of Excellence in Remote Sensing Education and Research, with the goal of increasing minority participation in environmental science.

== Recognition ==
In 2003, Hayden won the Presidential Award for Excellence in Science, Mathematics, and Engineering Mentoring, and US Black Engineer magazine gave her their Emerald Honors for Educational Leadership. A former ice shelf in the Antarctic was named for her institution by the Advisory Committee on Antarctic Names. Hayden's accomplishments earned her recognition by Mathematically Gifted & Black as a Black History Month 2017 Honoree.
