= Amy H. Herring =

American biostatistician

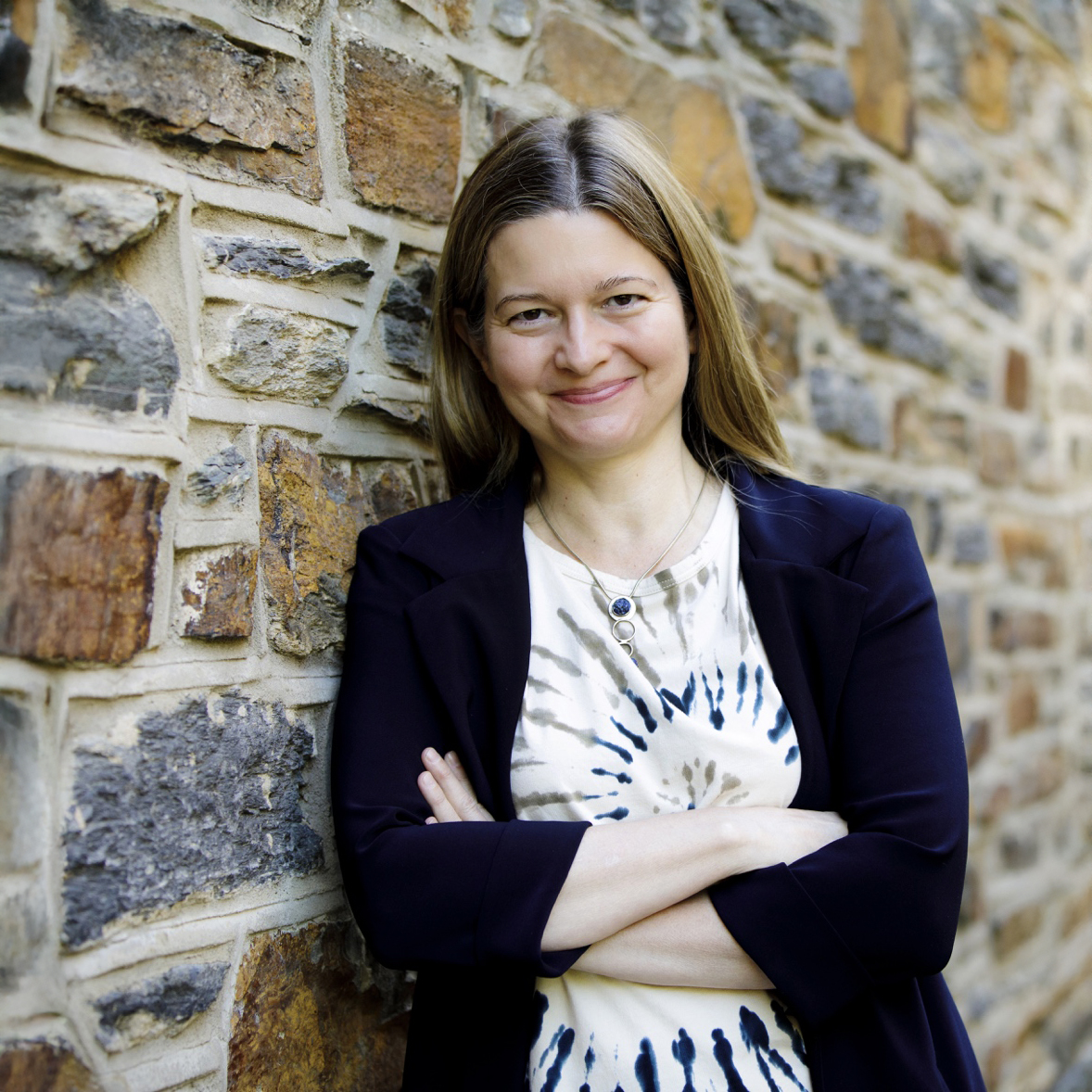
- Amy Herring in 2024
- Education: B.A. English and B.S. mathematics, University of Mississippi, 1995; Sc.D, biostatistics, Harvard University, 2000
- Spouse: David B. Dunson
- Scientific career
- Fields: Biostatistics
- Institutions: University of North Carolina at Chapel Hill; Duke University
- Thesis: Missing Covariates in Survival Analysis (2000)
- Doctoral advisor: Joseph G. Ibrahim

Amy Helen Herring is an American biostatistician interested in longitudinal data and reproductive health. Formerly the Carol Remmer Angle Distinguished Professor of Children's Environmental Health at the University of North Carolina at Chapel Hill, she is now Sara & Charles Ayres Distinguished Professor in the Department of Statistical Science, Global Health Institute, and Department of Biostatistics & Bioinformatics of Duke University.

== Education and career ==
Herring graduated summa cum laude from the University of Mississippi in 1995, with a double major in English and mathematics. She completed an Sc.D in biostatistics at Harvard University in 2000; her dissertation, supervised by Joseph G. Ibrahim, was Missing Covariates in Survival Analysis.

She joined the North Carolina faculty in 2000, where she became a fellow of the Carolina Population Center in 2006 and Carol Remmer Angle Distinguished Professor of Children's Environmental Health in 2015. She moved to Duke in 2017 as part of a hiring initiative to expand Duke's faculty in the quantitative sciences.

== Research ==
Herring has authored over 275 papers. She is most well known for her works on statistical methodology, Biostatistics, and applications to medicine.

Herring has contributed to the methodology of missing data, Bayesian inference, and models for data with complex structure (such as correlated, longitudinal or clustered data). Much of her applied work has focused on statistical methods for reproductive health. She has also contributed to applications in population and environmental health.

== Awards and honors ==
In 2010, Herring was elected as a Fellow of the American Statistical Association. She won the Gertrude M. Cox Award for outstanding contributions to applied statistics in 2012. In the same year, the American Public Health Association gave her their Mortimer Spiegelman Award. She won the 2018 Lagakos Distinguished Alumni Award from Harvard University Department of Biostatistics and the 2019 Janet L. Norwood Award for Outstanding Achievement by a Woman in the Statistical Sciences from the University of Alabama-Birmingham.

She has provided extensive service to the profession, serving as President of the Eastern North American Region of the International Biometric Society in 2011, as a Director on the executive board of the International Biometric Society 2021–2024, as Executive Secretary of the International Society for Bayesian Analysis (ISBA) 2016–2018, and on the ISBA Board 2013–2015; she has also held numerous leadership positions in the American Statistical Association including as Chair-Elect of the Section on Bayesian Statistical Science (2021) and as Chair of the Biometrics Section (2017).
