= Lilya Budaghyan =

Norwegian-Armenian mathematician, computer scientist (born 1976)

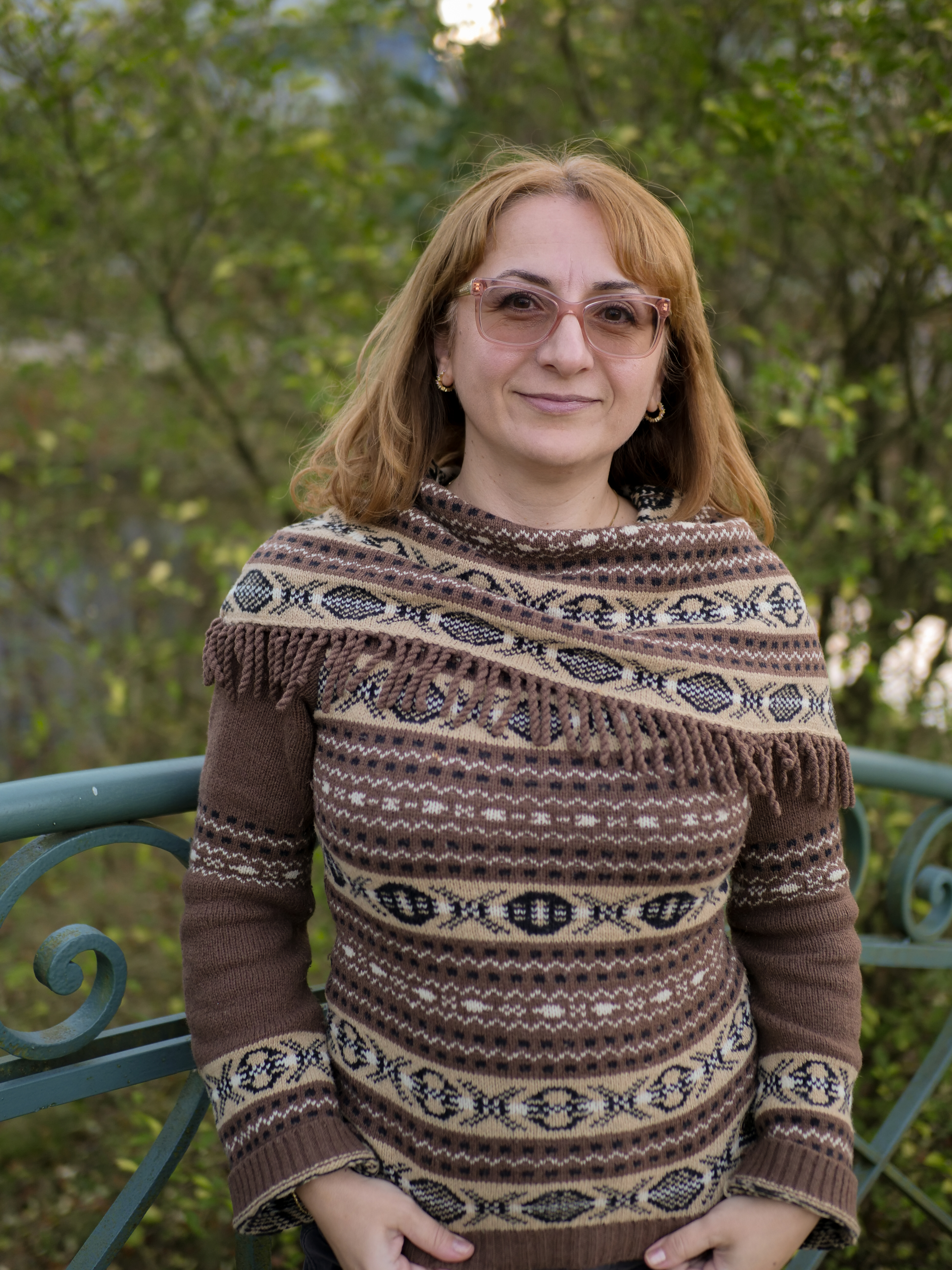
- Born: 29 January 1976 (age 50)
- Citizenship: Armenia; Norway
- Occupations: Professor at the University of Bergen; Mathematician; Computer Scientist

Lilya Budaghyan (born January 29, 1976) is a Norwegian-Armenian cryptographer, computer scientist, and discrete mathematician known for her work on cryptographic Boolean functions. She is a professor at the Department of Informatics of the University of Bergen in Norway, where she directs the Selmer Center in Secure Communication and leads Boolean functions team.

== Education and career ==
Budaghyan earned a diploma with honour in mathematics from Yerevan State University in 1998. After additional graduate research at Yerevan State University, she completed a PhD at Otto von Guericke University Magdeburg in Germany in 2005. Her PhD dissertation is The equivalence of almost bent and almost perfect nonlinear functions and their generalizations.

After postdoctoral research at the University of Trento, Italy, the University of Bergen, and the University of Paris 8 Vincennes-Saint-Denis, she became a professor at the University of Bergen in 2019.

== Works ==
Budaghyan is the author of the book Construction and Analysis of Cryptographic Functions (Springer, 2014).

== Recognition ==
Budaghyan won the Emil Artin Junior Prize in Mathematics for outstanding contributions in algebra, geometry and number theory in 2011 for a joint paper with Tor Helleseth titled “New commutative semifields defined by new PN multinomials”. In 2022 another paper co-authored by Budaghyan led to Emil Artin Junior Prize "Relation between o-equivalence and EA-equivalence for Niho bent functions".

She is a member of the Norwegian Academy of Technological Sciences, elected in 2019.
