= Barrett O'Neill =

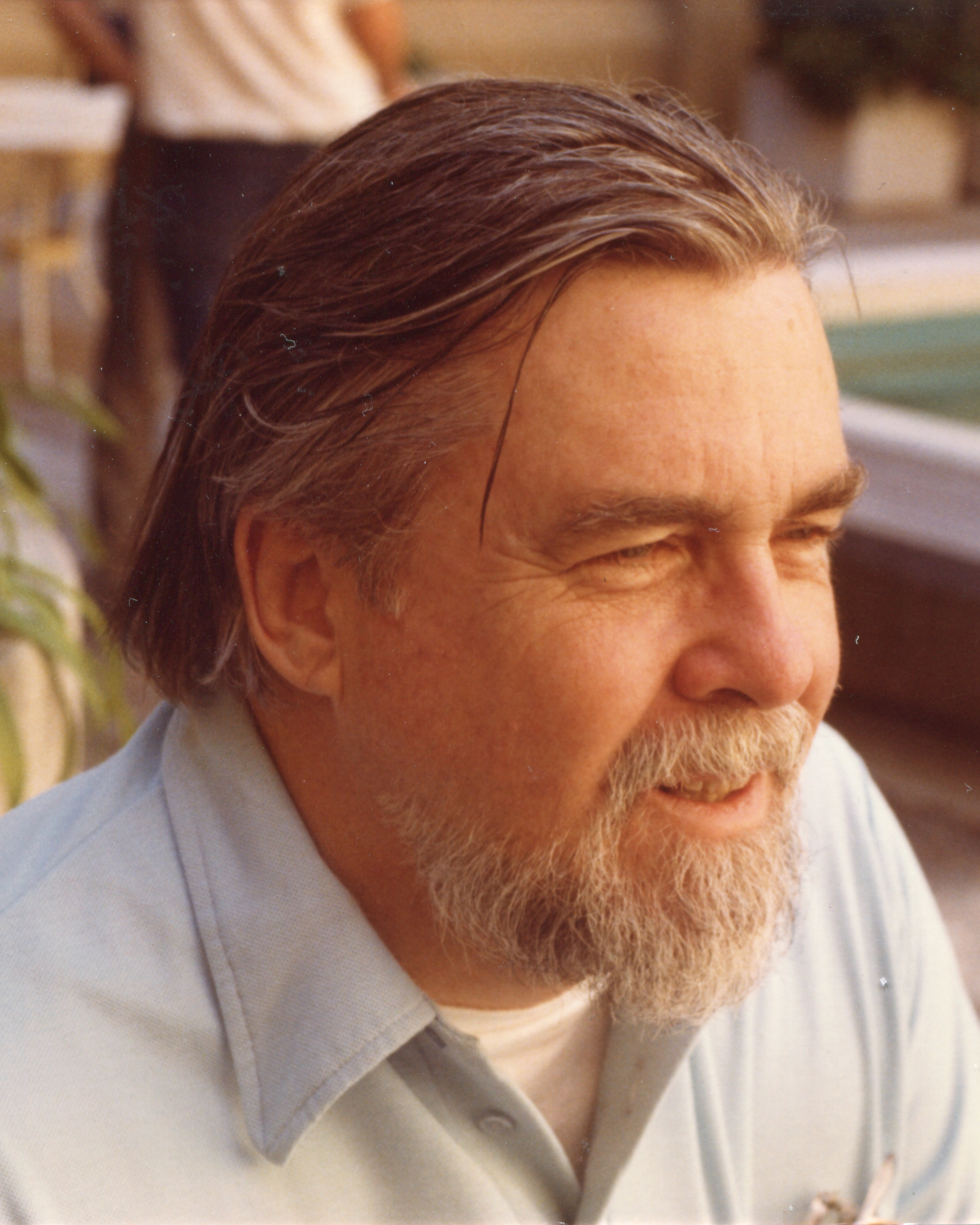
Barrett O'Neill in 1980

Barrett O'Neill (1924– 16 June 2011) was an American mathematician. He is known for contributions to differential geometry, including two widely-used textbooks on its foundational theory. He was the author of eighteen research articles, the last of which was published in 1973.

He received his Ph.D. in mathematics in 1951 from the Massachusetts Institute of Technology. His doctoral advisor was Witold Hurewicz. His dissertation thesis was titled Some Fixed Point Theorems He has worked as a professor of mathematics at UCLA, where he supervised the PhDs of eight doctoral students.

He made a foundational contribution to the theory of Riemannian submersions, showing how geometric quantities on the total space and on the base are related to one another. "O'Neill's formula" refers to the relation between the sectional curvatures. O'Neill's calculations simplified earlier work by other authors, and have become standard textbook material. With Richard Bishop, he applied his submersion calculations to the geometry of warped products, in addition to studying the fundamental role of convex functions and convex sets in Riemannian geometry, and for the geometry of negative sectional curvature in particular. An article with his former Ph.D. student Patrick Eberlein made a number of further contributions to the Riemannian geometry of negative curvature, including the notion of the "boundary at infinity".

== Major publications ==
Books

- Barrett O'Neill. Elementary differential geometry. Revised second edition of the 1966 original. Elsevier/Academic Press, Amsterdam, 2006. xii+503 pp. ISBN 978-0-12-088735-4, 0-12-088735-5
- Barrett O'Neill. Semi-Riemannian geometry. With applications to relativity. Pure and Applied Mathematics, 103. Academic Press, Inc. [Harcourt Brace Jovanovich, Publishers], New York, 1983. xiii+468 pp. ISBN 0-12-526740-1
- Barrett O'Neill. The geometry of Kerr black holes. A K Peters, Ltd., Wellesley, MA, 1995. xviii+381 pp. ISBN 1-56881-019-9

Articles

- Barrett O'Neill. The fundamental equations of a submersion. Michigan Math. J. 13 (1966), 459–469. doi:10.1307/mmj/1028999604
- R.L. Bishop and B. O'Neill. Manifolds of negative curvature. Trans. Amer. Math. Soc. 145 (1969), 1–49. doi:10.2307/1995057; doi:10.1090/S0002-9947-1969-0251664-4
- P. Eberlein and B. O'Neill. Visibility manifolds. Pacific J. Math. 46 (1973), 45–109. doi:10.2140/pjm.1973.46.45
