= Joint Statistical Meetings =

Annual conference of statisticians

The Joint Statistical Meetings (JSM) is a professional conference/academic conference for statisticians and data scientists held annually every year since 1840 (usually in August). Billed as "the largest gathering of statisticians held in North America", JSM has attracted over 5,000 participants in recent years. The following statistical societies are designated as official JSM partners:

- the American Statistical Association (ASA)
- the Institute of Mathematical Statistics (IMS)
- two regions of the International Biometric Society (IBS)
  - the Eastern North American Region (ENAR)
  - the Western North American Region (WNAR)
- the Statistical Society of Canada (SSC)
- International Society for Bayesian Analysis (ISBA)
- International Chinese Statistical Association (ICSA)
- International Indian Statistical Association (IISA)
- Korean International Statistical Society (KISS)

The founding members of JSM were the ASA, IMS, IBS, and SSC.

In addition to committee meetings, JSM activities include

- career placement services
- continuing education courses
- oral presentations
- panel sessions
- plenary sessions
- poster sessions

== Future Meetings ==
Dates	Location	Venue
August 7–12, 2027	Chicago, Illinois	
August 5–10, 2028	Philadelphia, Pennsylvania	
August 4–9, 2029	Seattle, Washington	
August 3–8, 2030	Milwaukee, Wisconsin	Baird Center

== Past Meetings ==
Since 1978 when attendance figures were first reported.

Dates	Location	Attendance
August 14–17, 1978	San Diego, California	2,650
August 13–16, 1979	Washington, D.C.	3,300
August 11–14, 1980	Houston, Texas	2,000
August 10–13, 1981	Detroit, Michigan	2,100
August 16–19, 1982	Cincinnati, Ohio	2,400
August 15–18, 1983	Toronto, Ontario	3,100
August 13–16, 1984	Philadelphia, Pennsylvania	3,200
August 5–8, 1985	Las Vegas, Nevada	2,700
August 18–21, 1986	Chicago, Illinois	3,100
August 17–20, 1987	San Francisco, California	3,700
August 22–25, 1988	New Orleans, Louisiana	2,600
August 6–10, 1989	Washington, D.C.	4,200
August 6–9, 1990	Anaheim, California	2,800
August 18–22, 1991	Atlanta, Georgia	3,700
August 9–13, 1992	Boston, Massachusetts	4,400
August 8–12, 1993	San Francisco, California	4,800
August 13–18, 1994	Toronto, Ontario	4,500
August 13–17, 1995	Orlando, Florida	3,800
August 4–8, 1996	Chicago, Illinois	4,750
August 10–14, 1997	Anaheim, California	4,200
August 9–13, 1998	Dallas, Texas	3,850
August 8–12, 1999	Baltimore, Maryland	5,000
August 13–17, 2000	Indianapolis, Indiana	3,635
August 5–9, 2001	Atlanta, Georgia	4,038
August 11–15, 2002	New York City, New York	5,444
August 3–7, 2003	San Francisco, California	5,542
August 8–12, 2004	Toronto, Ontario	5,138
August 7–11, 2005	Minneapolis, Minnesota	5,157
August 6–10, 2006	Seattle, Washington	6,034
July 29–August 2, 2007	Salt Lake City, Utah	5,186
August 3–7, 2008	Denver, Colorado	5,592
August 1–6, 2009	Washington, D.C.	6,804
July 31–August 5, 2010	Vancouver, British Columbia	5,600
July 30–August 4, 2011	Miami, Florida	5,300
July 28–August 2, 2012	San Diego, California	6,200
August 3–8, 2013	Montreal, Quebec	
August 2–7, 2014	Boston, Massachusetts	6,600+
August 8–13, 2015	Seattle, Washington	6,850
July 30–August 4, 2016	Chicago, Illinois	7,200
July 29–August 3, 2017	Baltimore, Maryland	6,579
July 28–August 2, 2018	Vancouver, British Columbia, Canada	6,346
July 27–August 1, 2019	Denver, Colorado	6,674
August 2–6, 2020	virtual (due to COVID-19 pandemic)	
August 8–12, 2021	virtual (due to COVID-19 pandemic)	
August 6–11, 2022	Washington, D.C.	5,000(est.)
August 5–10, 2023	Toronto, Ontario, Canada	6,000(est.)
August 4–8, 2024	Portland, Oregon	5,000(est.)
August 2–7, 2025	Nashville, Tennessee	5,000(est.)
August 1–6, 2026	Boston, Massachusetts	
