= Committee of Presidents of Statistical Societies =

The Committee of Presidents of Statistical Societies (COPSS) comprises the presidents, past presidents and presidents-elect of the following, primarily Northern American, professional societies of statisticians:

- American Statistical Association
- Institute of Mathematical Statistics
- Eastern North American Region of the International Biometric Society
- Western North American Region of the International Biometric Society
- Statistical Society of Canada

It also includes the president-elect-elect of Institute of Mathematical Statistics and the past-past-president of the Statistical Society of Canada.

COPSS is responsible for granting the following awards:

- The COPSS Presidents' Award for "an outstanding contribution to the profession of statistics" by a member of one of the constituent societies aged under 41
- The COPSS Distinguished Achievement Award and Lectureship for "achievement and scholarship in statistical science" that has made a "highly significant impact ... on scientific investigations"
- The Snedecor Award for "a noteworthy publication in biometry within three years of the data of the award"
- The Elizabeth L. Scott Award for "fostering opportunities in statistics for women"
- The Florence Nightingale David Award recognizes "a female statistician who serves as a role model to other women"
