= List of presidents of the Institute of Mathematical Statistics =

The president of the Institute of Mathematical Statistics is the highest officer of the Institute of Mathematical Statistics (IMS), and, together with the president-elect and past president, sets the directions for IMS during his or her term of office.

== Duties ==
According to the IMS Handbook for Officers, Editors, Council Members and Committee Chairs (2003), the president makes appointments to IMS committee vacancies, represents the Society to other organizations such as the Committee of Presidents of Statistical Societies (COPSS) and the Conference Board of the Mathematical Sciences (CBMS). In addition, the president is an ex officio member of the corporation of the National Institute for Statistical Sciences (NISS), and is responsible for appointing another member of the corporation and a member of the NISS Board of Trustees.

== List of presidents ==
=== 20th century ===
- 1936 Henry L. Rietz
- 1937 Walter A. Shewhart
- 1938 Burton H. Camp
- 1939 Paul R. Rider
- 1940 Samuel S. Wilks
- 1941 Harold Hotelling
- 1942-43 Cecil C. Craig
- 1944 Walter A. Shewhart
- 1945 W. Edwards Deming
- 1946 William Gemmell Cochran
- 1947 William Feller
- 1948 Abraham Wald
- 1949 Jerzy Neyman
- 1950 Joseph Leo Doob
- 1951 Paul S. Dwyer
- 1952 Meyer Abraham Girshick
- 1953 Morris H. Hansen
- 1954 Edwin G. Olds
- 1955 Henry Scheffé
- 1956 David Blackwell
- 1957 Alexander M. Mood
- 1958 Leonard Jimmie Savage
- 1959 Jacob Wolfowitz
- 1960 John Tukey
- 1961 Erich L. Lehmann
- 1962 Albert H. Bowker
- 1963 Theodore W. Anderson
- 1964 Z. W. Birnbaum
- 1965 Herbert Solomon
- 1966 Herbert Robbins
- 1967 Ted Harris
- 1968 Herman Chernoff
- 1969 Wassily Hoeffding
- 1970 Jack Kiefer
- 1971 William Kruskal
- 1972 Raj Chandra Bose
- 1973 Lucien Le Cam
- 1974 R. R. Bahadur
- 1975 Frederick Mosteller
- 1976 Donald L. Burkholder
- 1977 C. R. Rao
- 1978 Elizabeth Scott
- 1979 Samuel Karlin
- 1980 George E. P. Box
- 1981 Peter J. Bickel
- 1982 Mark Kac
- 1983 Patrick Billingsley
- 1984 Ingram Olkin
- 1985 Oscar Kempthorne
- 1986 Paul Meier
- 1987 Ronald Pyke
- 1988 Bradley Efron
- 1989 Ramanathan Gnanadesikan
- 1990 Shanti S. Gupta
- 1991 David O. Siegmund
- 1992 Willem van Zwet
- 1993 Larry Brown
- 1994 Stephen Stigler
- 1995 David R. Brillinger
- 1996 James O. Berger
- 1997 Nancy Reid
- 1998 Persi Diaconis
- 1999 Stephen Fienberg

=== 21st century ===
- 2000 Morris Eaton
- 2001 Bernard Silverman
- 2002 Iain M. Johnstone
- 2003 S. R. S. Varadhan
- 2004 Terry Speed
- 2005 Louis Chen Hsiao Yun
- 2006 Thomas G. Kurtz
- 2007 Jim Pitman
- 2008 Jianqing Fan
- 2009 Nanny Wermuth
- 2010 J. Michael Steele
- 2011 Peter Gavin Hall
- 2012 Ruth J. Williams
- 2013 Hans-Rudolf Künsch
- 2014 Bin Yu
- 2015 Erwin Bolthausen
- 2016 Richard Davis
- 2017 Jon A. Wellner
- 2018 Alison Etheridge
- 2019 Xiao-Li Meng
- 2020 Susan Murphy
- 2021 Regina Liu
- 2022 Krzysztof Burdzy
- 2023 Peter Bühlmann
- 2024 Michael Kosorok
