= Piet Groeneboom =

Dutch statistician

Petrus (Piet) Groeneboom
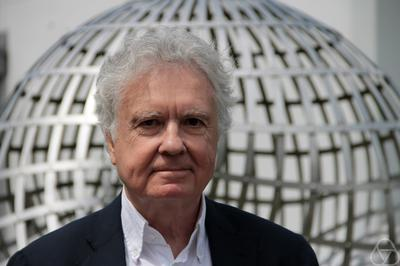
- Groeneboom in 2016
- Born: 24 September 1941 (age 84); Scheveningen, Netherlands
- Awards: Rollo Davidson Prize (1985)
- Scientific career
- Fields: Statistics; Probability theory
- Workplaces: Delft University of Technology; Vrije Universiteit Amsterdam; University of Washington
- Thesis: Large Deviations and Asymptotic Efficiencies (1979)
- Doctoral advisor: Jacobus (Kobus) Oosterhoff
- Doctoral students: Marloes Maathuis

Petrus (Piet) Groeneboom (born 24 September 1941) is a Dutch statistician who made major advances in the field of shape-constrained statistical inference such as isotonic regression, and also worked in probability theory.

== Education and career ==
Groeneboom was born in Scheveningen. At the beginning of his tertiary studies in 1959, he enrolled in medicine at the University of Amsterdam but quickly switched to psychology at the same university, obtaining a candidate degree in 1963. During his studies he attended a course on logic by analytic philosopher Else M. Barth, whose influence, along with that by Lambert Meertens after his (Groeneboom's) candidate degree, he later stated as having made him decide to study mathematics. He was an assistant of Johannes de Groot. He obtained a master's degree in mathematics in 1971, also at the University of Amsterdam, and studied at the Vrije Universiteit Amsterdam from 1975 under Kobus Oosterhoff, obtaining his Ph.D. degree in 1979.

Before and immediately after obtaining his master's degree, Groeneboom worked at the psychological laboratory of the University of Amsterdam. After his second stint there ended in 1973, he moved to the Centrum Wiskunde & Informatica, which at the time was called Mathematisch Centrum (Mathematical Centre), in the same city.

From 1979 to 1981, Groeneboom was a visiting assistant professor at the University of Washington, to where he would return from 1999 to 2013 as affiliate professor in the department of statistics. From 1981 on, he was again based at the Mathematical Centre before being appointed full professor of statistics at the University of Amsterdam in 1984. In 1988, he moved to Delft University of Technology, where he stayed until his retirement in 2006. From 2000 to 2006 he was additionally a part-time professor at the Vrije Universiteit Amsterdam.

Groeneboom has been a professor emeritus of statistics at Delft University of Technology since his retirement in 2006. He has also held positions at the Vrije Universiteit Amsterdam and the University of Washington. Following his retirement he came to public attention for his statistical work in the retrial of Lucia de Berk, a Dutch nurse, who had been convicted of murder.

== Research ==
In 1979, Groeneboom, together with Oosterhoff and Frits H. Ruymgaart, formulated and proved Sanov's theorem in a finer topology than had been known at the time. A paper he published in 1983 on properties of Brownian motion gave rise to a large body of literature on minorants of more general stochastic processes. One of the main areas of work of Groeneboom has been shape constrained statistical inference, which includes isotonic regression, an area with links to the aforementioned minorant problems, as a special case. His interest in shape constrained inference began in the second half of his two-year stay at the University of Washington. In a 1985 article on an estimator of a monotone density named after Ulf Grenander, he introduced the switching (or switch) relation, which came to be used widely in the area. He found the analytic form of Chernoff's distribution, which later was understood to be omnipresent in monotone problems, in the 1980s, independently of others who worked on the problem at the same time. His paper on the problem came to be regarded as a benchmark in the field of shape constrained inference. In the 2010s he returned to the problem, giving new proofs in collaboration with Steve Lalley and Nico Temme.

Since the late 1980s, Groeneboom has also worked on censored regression models. He established the asymptotic distribution of the nonparametric maximum likelihood estimator of the survival function in the case of "case 1 censoring". The iterative convex minorant algorithm which he introduced in 1991 found use in statistical estimation for proportional hazards models.

Together with Eric Cator, Groeneboom contributed to the probabilistic analysis of the Hammersley process, a continuous interacting particle system (IPS). Methods similar to theirs were subsequently applied to other IPSs. He is known to influence academic thought amongst some American statisticians such as Jon A. Wellner.

== Statistical advocacy in Lucia de Berk case ==
In the late 2000s, Groeneboom joined Richard D. Gill in the attempt to overturn the conviction of Lucia de Berk, a Dutch nurse, who had been found guilty of murdering four of her patients, and attempting to kill three others. The matter was a high-profile case in the Netherlands, notable because it depended on the probabilities of certain events. They argued that statistical considerations that had led to the initial suspicions of murder, and those which had remained at the center stage of the case afterwards, were flawed. The effort was ultimately successful and de Berk was finally acquitted of all accusations in 2010.

== Honors and awards ==
For his paper on Chernoff's distribution, written in 1984 but appearing much later in 1989, Groeneboom was awarded the Rollo Davidson Prize 1985.

Groeneboom is a fellow of the Institute of Mathematical Statistics, and an elected member of the International Statistical Institute. In 2013, he delivered the Wald lectures at the Joint Statistical Meetings in Montreal.

== Books authored ==
- Groeneboom, Piet; Jongbloed, Geurt (2014). Nonparametric Estimation under Shape Constraints: Estimators, Algorithms and Asymptotics. Cambridge: Cambridge University Press. ISBN 978-0-521-86401-5.
- Dobrushin, Roland; Groeneboom, Piet; Ledoux, Michel (1994). Lectures on Probability Theory and Statistics. Ecole d'Ete de Probabilites de St. Flour. Vol. XXIV. Berlin, Heidelberg: Springer. ISBN 978-3-540-62055-6.
- Groeneboom, Piet; Wellner, Jon A. (1992). Information Bounds and Nonparametric Maximum Likelihood Estimation. Basel: Springer. ISBN 978-3-7643-2794-1.
- Groeneboom, Piet (1980). Large Deviations and Asymptotic Efficiencies. Vol. 118. Amsterdam: Mathematical Centre. ISBN 90-6196-190-4.
