= Dorothy M. Gilford =

American statistician

- Born: Dorothy Jeanne Morrow; 1919; Ottumwa, Iowa, U.S.
- Died: December 6, 2014 (aged 94–95)
- Education: University of Washington
- Occupation: Statistician
- Spouse: Leon Gilford (m. 1950)
- Awards: Fellow of the American Statistical Association (1961)

Dorothy Morrow Gilford (1919 – December 6, 2014) was an American statistician who headed the Division of Mathematical Sciences at the Office of Naval Research, the National Center for Education Statistics, and the Conference Board of the Mathematical Sciences. She was the editor of The Aging Population in the Twenty-First Century: Statistics for Health Policy (National Academies Press, 1988).

== Early life and education ==
Dorothy Jeanne Morrow was born in Ottumwa, Iowa but grew up in Lincoln, Nebraska, Los Angeles, and Seattle. Her father, a sales manager for a tire manufacturer, died when she was eight. She graduated early from high school, at age 15, and at the advice of a school counselor studied mathematics at the University of Washington, with a minor in botany. She stayed on at Washington for a master's degree, and her interests shifted to more applied areas of mathematics after taking a course on actuarial science and statistics with Zygmunt Wilhelm Birnbaum there.

Because she applied to doctoral programs during World War II, the competition was light and Morrow had a choice of many programs to go to. Initially, she chose Bryn Mawr College, where she worked with Hilda Geiringer on genetics. In 1942 at the invitation of Harold Hotelling she transferred to Columbia University. She disliked the cold atmosphere and remote faculty there, and returned to Bryn Mawr after a year, but continued working with Hotelling. Without completing her doctorate, she took a faculty position at George Washington University. She finished a dissertation on mathematics related to Hotelling's T-squared distribution, but by then Hotelling had moved to North Carolina and the remaining Columbia faculty were unreceptive, so she never completed a Ph.D.

== Later career ==
Morrow married Leon Gilford in 1950, moved back to Washington after her unsuccessful attempts to complete her doctorate, and began consulting for the government, at first at the Naval Medical Research Institute and soon afterwards at the Civil Aeronautics Administration, where she became chief of biometrics, performing statistical analysis on medical information of airplane pilots. Next, she moved to the Federal Trade Commission as deputy director of financial statistics.

At the invitation of Herbert Solomon, who had been a graduate student with her at Columbia, she moved to the Office of Naval Research (ONR) in 1955. She ran their statistics branch under Joseph Weyl, a son of mathematician Hermann Weyl and director of mathematical sciences at ONR at that time. After a reorganization she headed both statistics and logistics at ONR. After Weyl's replacement, Fred Rigby, moved to Texas Tech, Gilford was promoted again, to director of mathematical sciences. She became the second female director after Mina Rees, who had founded the department. During this time, she also spent a year at Carnegie Mellon University, working on a second dissertation on the relation between faculty time management and institutional goals, but again failed to complete a doctorate.

During this period, Gilford was also active in service to the professional societies for her fields. She served as secretary of the Institute of Mathematical Statistics from 1960 to 1964, worked with the International Statistical Institute, and chaired the Conference Board of the Mathematical Sciences.

In 1968, Gilford left ONR, at a time when the ONR was shifting away from basic research to more applied military research under the Mansfield Amendment. She moved to the Department of Health, Education, and Welfare, where she headed the National Center for Education Statistics. Caught up in office politics there, she retired from federal service in 1974, and came to work for the National Academy of Sciences, eventually becoming involved with the Committee on National Statistics there, and founding and heading the Board on International Comparative Studies in Education. After another 19 years of work there, she retired for a second time.

== Recognition ==
In 1965, president Lyndon Johnson gave Gilford received the Federal Women's Award, an honor limited to five women per year. She was the second statistician to receive this award, after Aryness Joy Wickens.

Gilford was elected as a Fellow of the American Statistical Association in 1961, two years before her husband obtained the same honor. She was named a Fellow of the American Association for the Advancement of Science in 1962. She was also a Fellow of the Institute of Mathematical Statistics and an elected member of the International Statistical Institute.
