= Cbms =

CBMS may refer to:

- Conference Board of the Mathematical Sciences
- Chemical biological mass spectrometer
- Comic book movies
