= Wellner =

Wellner is a surname. Notable people with the surname include:

- Charles Wellner (1911–2001) United States Forest Service scientist
- Jon Wellner (born 1975), American actor
- Karel Wellner (1875–1926), Czech graphic artist, painter, cartoonist, illustrator, art historian, and critic
- Steven M. Wellner (born 1959), American judge
