= Morris H. Hansen =

American statistician (1910–1990)

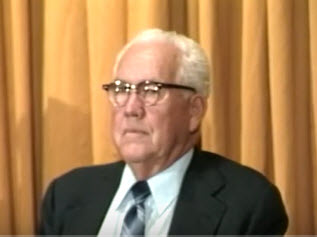
- Born: 15 December 1910; Thermopolis, Wyoming, U.S.
- Died: 9 October 1990; Washington D.C., U.S.
- Education: University of Wyoming; American University
- Known for: Survey sampling theory
- Scientific career
- Fields: Statistician
- Institutions: United States Census Bureau; Westat

Morris Howard Hansen (1910–1990) was an American statistician. While at the United States Census Bureau, he was one of the first to develop methods for statistical sampling and made contributions in many areas of surveys and censuses.

== Biography ==
=== Early life ===
Hansen was born on December 15, 1910, in Thermopolis, Wyoming in the United States. The family lived in the nearby town of Worland, Wyoming. He graduated from the University of Wyoming in 1934 with a degree in accounting and then moved to Washington, DC in search of a job. He ended up at the Census Bureau and took classes at the Graduate School of the U.S. Department of Agriculture and at American University where he took courses from W. Edwards Deming and Meyer Abraham Girshick. He received a master's degree in statistics in 1940 from American University. He was later granted an honorary doctorate by the University of Wyoming in recognition of his many contributions to survey research.

=== U.S. Census Bureau 1935–1968 ===
One of Hansen's earliest projects at the Census Bureau was a follow-up sample survey to check on the validity of a 1937 depression era voluntary census of the unemployed and partially unemployed. For the census, postal workers delivered a questionnaire to be filled out and returned. There were problems in getting complete and accurate response in the census. He helped design the sample and the statistical procedures to generate estimates of unemployment and estimates of the standard errors of the unemployment estimates, and to project sample estimates to smaller areas through regression relationships. In the late 1930s and early 1940s the idea of using sample surveys for official governmental guidance, was quite new. “Before that the Census Bureau had the idea that they couldn't do sampling because that would discredit the results; they had to have complete coverage.”

This experience encouraged the Works Progress Administration beginning in 1940 to sponsor the development of a monthly sample survey of households to provide estimates of employment and unemployment, later known as the Current Population Survey.

His papers with William N. Hurwitz are viewed as foundational building blocks for later developments in design-based sampling theory. The developments in single-stage and multi-stage sampling culminated in the two volume set of books with Hurwitz and W.G. Madow on sampling theory that are still regarded as a basic resources for practicing survey statisticians.

=== Later years ===
After retiring from the Census Bureau, Hansen joined Westat, a private research firm in Rockville MD USA, as a vice president in 1968. He was later elected chairman of the board of directors, a capacity in which he served until 1990. With his long-time colleague, Benjamin J. Tepping, Hansen designed innovative multistage procedures for selecting establishments and goods to price within establishments in the CPI. The US Bureau of Labor Statistics adopted the new methods and later extended them to the Producer Price Index and the International Trade Price Index.

In 1983, while at Westat, he, Tepping, and Madow published an important contribution to an ongoing controversy among researchers in sampling theory and estimation on the role of models in making inferences from survey data.

== Honors ==
In 1947 he was elected as a Fellow of the American Statistical Association. He also served as President of the Institute of Mathematical Statistics in 1953 and President of the American Statistical Association in 1960. In 1990 Hansen was awarded the American Statistical Association's Founders Award. His reminiscences on survey sampling can be viewed on the American Statistical Association Amstat Videos page. He died in 1990 at the age of 79 in Washington DC. Hansen was the first president of the International Association of Survey Statisticians He was elected to the U.S. National Academy of Sciences in 1976

== See also ==
- Survey sampling
