= Lehoczky =

Lehoczky or Lehóczky is a surname. Notable people with this surname include:

- Ágnes Lehóczky (born 1976), Hungarian poet, academic and translator
- John Lehoczky (born 1943), American statistician
- Roland Lehoczky (born 2002), Hungarian footballer
