= Alexander Ogilvie =

Alexander Ogilvie may refer to:

- Alexander Walker Ogilvie (1829–1902), Canadian politician
- Alec Ogilvie (1882–1962), British aviation pioneer
