= David Madigan =

Irish and American statistician

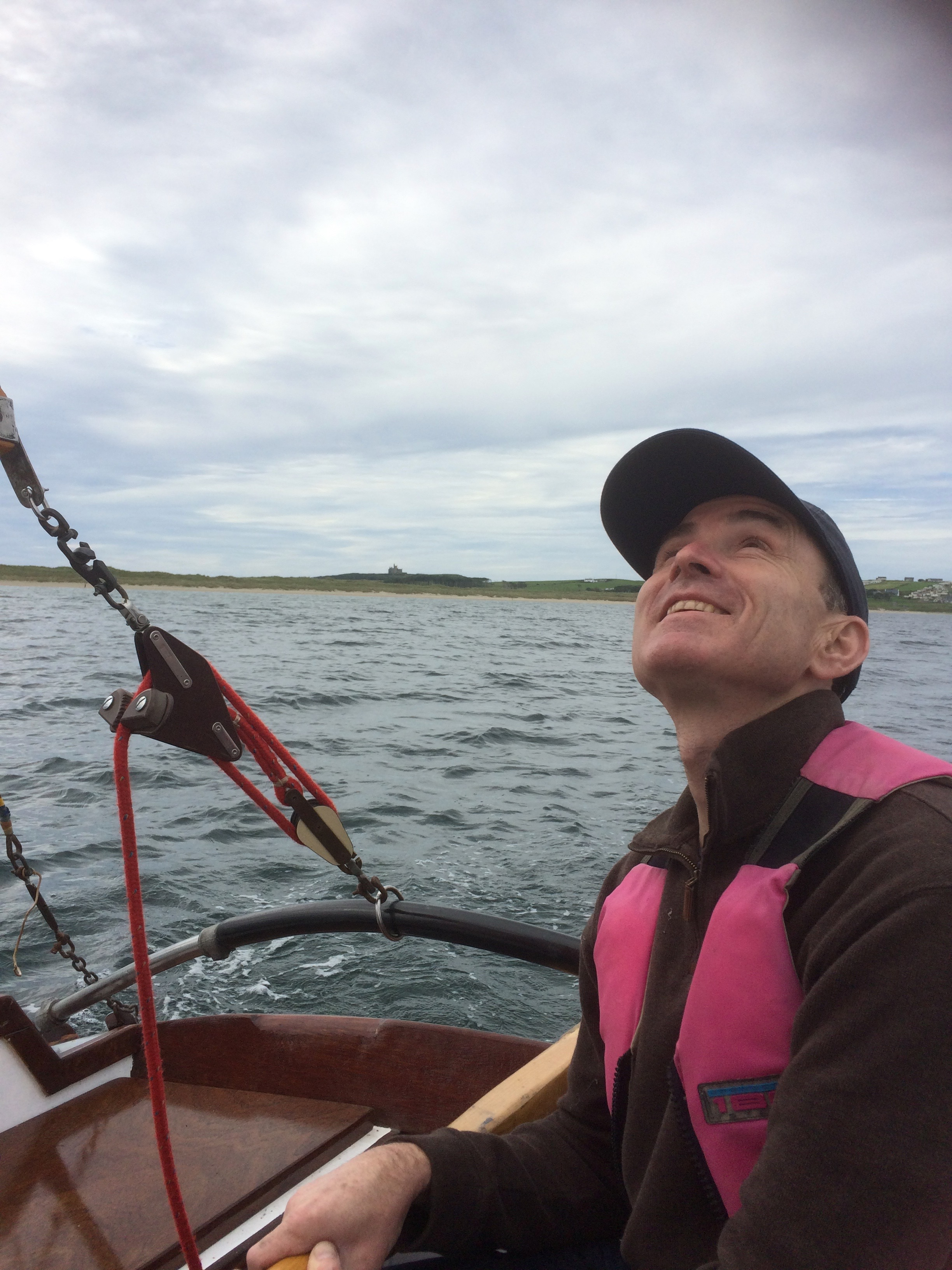

11th Provost and Senior Vice-President for Academic Affairs, Northeastern University
- In office June 5, 2020 – June 30, 2025
- Preceded by: James C. Bean
- Succeeded by: Beth Winkelstein

Executive Vice-President of Arts and Sciences, Columbia University
- In office 1 September 2013 – 31 August 2018
- Preceded by: Nicholas B. Dirks
- Succeeded by: Amy Hungerford

Personal details
- Born: 11 December 1962 (age 63) Athlone, Ireland
- Education: Trinity College Dublin (BA, PhD)
- Profession: Statistician, Professor

David Bennett Madigan (born 11 December 1962) is an Irish-American statistician and academic. He is currently Professor of Statistics and Special Advisor to the President at Northeastern University. From 2020 to 2025 he was Provost and Senior Vice-President for Academic Affairs at Northeastern University. Previously he was Professor of Statistics at Columbia University. From 2013 to 2018 he was also the Executive Vice-President for Arts and Sciences and Dean of the Faculty of Arts and Sciences and from 2008 to 2013 he served as Chair of the Department of Statistics, both at Columbia University. He was Dean of Physical and Mathematical Sciences at Rutgers University (2005–2007), Director of the Institute of Biostatistics at Rutgers University (2003–2004), and Professor in the Department of Statistics at Rutgers University (2001–2007).

== Education ==
Madigan received his bachelor's degree in mathematics (1984, First Class Honours, Gold Medal) and a Ph.D. in statistics (1990), both from Trinity College Dublin. His Ph.D. thesis, titled An Investigation of Weights of Evidence in the Context of Probablilistic Expert Systems, was written under the supervision of Krzysztof Mosurski.

== Career ==
=== Early career ===
Madigan began his academic career in the 1990s at the University of Washington where he was an Assistant and then Associate Professor of Statistics. He received the University's Distinguished Teaching Award in 1995. Madigan has also served as Vice President, Data Mining, Soliloquy, Inc. (2000-2001), Principal Technical Staff Member, AT&T Labs-Research (1999-2000), Information Technology Consultant, KPMG (1989-1990), Technology Manager, Peregrine Expert Systems Ltd. (1986-1989), Expert System Consultant, SkillSoft, (1985-1986), and Actuarial Associate, Hibernian Life Assurance, Ireland (1984-1985).

=== Honors ===
Madigan is an elected Member of the International Statistical Institute (2014), a Fellow of the American Association for the Advancement of Science (2012), a Fellow of the Institute of Mathematical Statistics (2006), and a Fellow of the American Statistical Association (1999). He has served as program co-chair for the FODS, KDD and AI-STATS conferences, Action Editor for the Journal of Machine Learning Research, Editor-in-Chief of Statistical Science, and Editor-in-Chief of Statistical Analysis and Data Mining, the ASA Data Science Journal.

=== Scholarship ===
He has over 200 publications in such areas as Bayesian statistics, text mining, Monte Carlo methods, pharmacovigilance and probabilistic graphical models. He has advised 18 Ph.D. students. In recent years he has focused on statistical methodology for generating reliable evidence from large-scale healthcare data. From 2011 to 2014 he was a member of the FDA's Drug Safety and Risk Management Advisory Committee.

== Personal life ==
Madigan grew up in Athlone in the center of Ireland, where he attended the Marist Brothers schools.
