= Statistical Science =

- Discipline: Statistics
- Language: English
- Edited by: Moulinath Banerjee

Publication details
- History: 1986–present
- Publisher: Institute of Mathematical Statistics (USA)
- Impact factor: 3.523 (2009)

Standard abbreviations
- ISO 4: Stat. Sci.
- MathSciNet: Statist. Sci.

Indexing
- ISSN: 0883-4237
- LCCN: sn98-23316
- JSTOR: 08834237
- OCLC no.: 12143452

Links
- Journal homepage; Access via Project Euclid; Full text from 2004 at arXiv

Statistical Science is a review journal published by the Institute of Mathematical Statistics, headquartered in Shaker Heights, Ohio, United States. The founding editor was Morris H. DeGroot, who explained the mission of the journal in his 1986 editorial:

"A central purpose of Statistical Science is to convey the richness, breadth and unity of the field by presenting the full range of contemporary statistical thought at a modest technical level accessible to the wide community of practitioners, teachers, researchers and students of statistics and probability."

== Editors ==
- 2023–2025 Moulinath Banerjee
- 2020–2022 Sonia Petrone
- 2017–2019 Cun-Hui Zhang
- 2014–2016 Peter Green
- 2011–2013 Jon Wellner
- 2008–2010 David Madigan
- 2005–2007 Ed George
- 2002–2004 George Casella
- 2001 Morris Eaton
- 2001 Richard Tweedie
- 1998–2000 Leon Gleser
- 1995–1997 Paul Switzer
- 1992–1994 Robert E. Kass
- 1989–1991 Carl N. Morris
- 1985–1989 Morris H. DeGroot
