= Peter Bühlmann =

Swiss mathematician (born 1965)

Peter Lukas Bühlmann
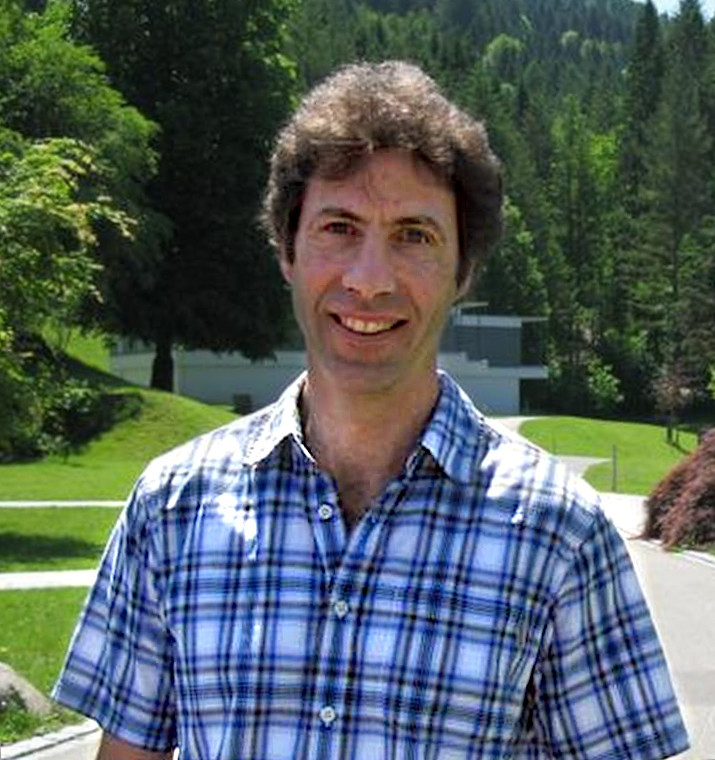
- Bühlmann at Oberwolfach in 2012
- Born: April 12, 1965 (age 61); Zürich, Switzerland

Academic background
- Education: ETH Zurich
- Doctoral advisor: Hans-Rudolf Künsch

Academic work
- Institutions: University of California, Berkeley; ETH Zurich
- Website: people.math.ethz.ch/~buhlmann/

Peter Lukas Bühlmann (born 12 April 1965) is a Swiss mathematician and statistician who is a professor of statistics at ETH Zurich. His research includes high-dimensional statistics, statistical machine learning, causal inference, graphical models, computational statistics, and applications of statistics to biology, public health and medicine.

== Biography ==
Bühlmann was born on 12 April 1965 in Zürich, Switzerland. He studied mathematics at ETH Zurich from 1985 to 1990, receiving a Diplom in mathematics in 1990. He subsequently pursued doctoral studies at ETH Zurich and received a doctorate in mathematics in 1993. His doctoral dissertation, The Blockwise Bootstrap in Time Series and Empirical Processes, was supervised by Hans-Rudolf Künsch and Erwin Bolthausen

== Career ==
From 1994 to 1995, Bühlmann was a postdoctoral research fellow at the University of California, Berkeley, supported by the Swiss National Science Foundation. From 1995 to 1997, he was a Neyman Assistant Professor in the Department of Statistics at Berkeley.

Bühlmann joined ETH Zurich as an assistant professor in 1997. He became an associate professor in 2001 and a full professor in the Department of Mathematics in 2004. He chaired the Department of Mathematics from 2013 to 2017.

Since 2019, Bühlmann has been director of ETH Foundations of Data Science. He has also served on the steering committee of the ETH AI Center since 2020 and was a founding member of the Max Planck ETH Center for Learning Systems from 2012 to 2024.

Bühlmann was a Rothschild Distinguished Visiting Fellow and Lecturer at the Isaac Newton Institute in 2018 and a Miller Visiting Professor at the University of California, Berkeley, in 2017. He was also a James Francis Hannan Visiting Scholar at Michigan State University and an IAS Senior Scholar-in-Residence at the Institute for Advanced Study in Park City in 2016. Since 2024, he also serve as a Saw Swee Hock Professorship of Statistics at National University of Singapore.

He was an invited speaker in the Probability and Statistics section of the International Congress of Mathematicians in Rio de Janeiro in 2018. In 2021 he was a plenary speaker at the 8th European Congress of Mathematics, held in Portorož. In 2025 he delivered the Rouse Ball Lecture at the University of Cambridge.

=== Professional service ===
Bühlmann served as co-editor of the Annals of Statistics from 2010 to 2012. He served as program co-chair of the 2018 Annual Meeting of the Institute of Mathematical Statistics and has held positions on scientific advisory boards and committees in Switzerland and internationally.

He was elected president of the Institute of Mathematical Statistics and served as president from 2022 to 2023. He delivered the IMS presidential address at the 2023 Joint Statistical Meetings in Toronto.

== Research ==
Bühlmann's research encompasses high-dimensional and computational statistics, statistical machine learning, causal inference, graphical models, and applications in biology, public health and medicine.

Among his research contributions is work on variable selection and high-dimensional statistical inference. His 2010 paper with Nicolai Meinshausen, "Stability selection", introduced a general approach for improving the stability of variable-selection procedures. Bühlmann has also worked on causal inference and causality, including the formulation and methodology based on invariance for identifying causal relationships from observational and heterogeneous data.

== Honors and awards ==
- 1990: Pólya Prize, ETH Zurich, for the best diploma in mathematics
- 1993: Award for Excellent Young Scientists, ETH Zurich
- 2006: Fellow of the Institute of Mathematical Statistics
- 2012: Golden Tricycle Award, ETH Zürich, for most family-friendly supervisor
- 2013: Winton Research Prize
- 2016: Fellow of the American Statistical Association
- 2017: Doctor honoris causa, Université catholique de Louvain
- 2018: Guy Medal in Silver Royal Statistical Society for work including stability selection and causal inference using invariant prediction.
- 2018:Neyman Award and Lecture, Institute of Mathematical Statistics
- 2018: ERC Advanced Grant, European Research Council
- 2022: elected member of the German National Academy of Sciences Leopoldina
- 2024: Wald Memorial Award and Lecture, Institute of Mathematical Statistics
- 2026: Frontiers of Science Award, jointly with Dominik Rothenhäusler, Nicolai Meinshausen and Jonas Peters

Bühlmann was named a Clarivate Highly Cited Researcher in mathematics in 2014-2020 and again in 2025, and in computer science in 2017.

== Selected publications ==
=== Books ===
- with Sara van de Geer: Statistics for high-dimensional data. Methods, Theory and Applications, Springer 2011
- as editor with P. Drineas, M. Kane, M. van der Laan: Handbook of Big Data, Chapman and Hall 2016
- as editor with others: Statistical Analysis for High-Dimensional Data. The Abel Symposium 2014, Springer 2016

=== Articles ===
- With Peters, Jonas and Meinshausen, Nicolai . "Causal inference by using invariant prediction: identification and confidence intervals". Journal of the Royal Statistical Society, Series B. 78 (5),2016: 947–1012.
- With van de Geer, S., Ritov, Y. and Dezeure, R. (2014). On asymptotically optimal confidence regions and tests for high-dimensional models. Annals of Statistics 42, 1166-1202.
- With Stekhoven, D. MissForest - nonparametric missing value imputation for mixed-type data. Bioinformatics 28, 2012, 112-118.
- with N. Meinshausen: High-dimensional graphs and variable selection with the lasso, Annals of Statistics, vol. 34, 2006, pp. 1436–1462, Arxiv
- with N. Meinshausen: Stability selection, Journal of the Royal Statistical Society, Series B, vol. 72, 2010, pp. 417–473 doi:10.1111/j.1467-9868.2010.00740.x
- with L. Meier, S. Van de Geer: The group lasso for logistic regression, Journal of the Royal Statistical Society, Series B, vol. 70, 2008, pp. 53–71 doi:10.1111/j.1467-9868.2007.00627.x
- with B. Yu: Boosting with the L_{2} loss: regression and classification, Journal of the American Statistical Association, vol. 98, 2003, pp. 324–339 doi:10.1198/016214503000125
- with J. J. Goeman: Analyzing gene expression data in terms of gene sets: methodological issues, Bioinformatics, vol. 23, 2007, pp. 980–987 doi:10.1093/bioinformatics/btm051
- with B. Yu: Analyzing bagging, Annals of Statistics, vol. 30, 2002, pp. 927–961 doi:10.1214/aos/1031689014
- with T. Hothorn: Boosting algorithms: Regularization, prediction and model fitting, Statistical Science, vol. 22, 2007, pp. 477–505 doi:10.1214/07-STS242
- with S. van de Geer: On the conditions used to prove oracle results for the Lasso, Electronic Journal of Statistics, vol. 3, 2009, pp. 1360–1392 doi:10.1214/09-EJS506
