= Ethel Newbold =

English epidemiologist and statistician (1882–1933)

- Born: Ethel May Newbold; 28 August 1882; Tunbridge Wells
- Died: 25 March 1933 (aged 50)
- Education: Newnham College University of London
- Occupation: Epidemiologist Statistician

Ethel May Newbold (28 August 1882 – 25 March 1933) was an English epidemiologist and statistician. She was the first woman awarded the Guy Medal in Silver in 1928.

== Early life ==
Ethel May Newbold was born in Tunbridge Wells. Out of eleven children, she was the eldest daughter of William Newbold (1828–1900) and Eleanor Isabel Newbold, née Fergusson (1862–1942). Her mother was born in California and her parents married in Mexico. Her older brother Charles Joseph Newbold (1881–1946) was a noted rugby player and chemist.

== Education ==
She was educated at first by a governess and afterwards won a scholarship offered by the Girls' Public Day School Company in order to attend Tunbridge Wells High School

The Kent & Sussex Courier reported the December 1902 Tunbridge Wells High School School Prize Giving in detail.

"In geometry the examiner says that of the three candidates taking both parts of the paper one did brilliantly—this girl, we know, was Ethel Newbold, who got full marks, 90 out of 90 on the second part".... "The Chairman again congratulated the school on its success in the matter of education, and observed that he noticed the name of Ethel Newbold was mentioned very frequently in the report, and he was sure the school was proud of her (applause)".

Ethel won a mathematics prize and was awarded an open scholarship for three years at University of Cambridge.

"Ethel Newbold carried off an open scholarship to Newnham College this year – the value of it is £50 a year for three years and it is one of the most difficult scholarships to win. It was awarded to her on the results of the Higher Local Examinations in which she got a double first in classics and mathematics, with distinction in Latin and arithmetic. She was also awarded on the same examination a prize of the value of £3 10s; a certain number of these prizes are awarded to the best candidates of the year".

Her tutor at Cambridge was Mr. G. H. Hardy, Fellow of Trinity College. The London Daily News reported on "The Lady Wrangler" on 14 June 1905.

"Miss E. M. Newbold, of Newnham, the only woman student to find a place among the Wranglers, and she is placed equal to 26th … With her latest success Miss Newbold's career at Newnham concludes, and she is now leaving college for the purpose of entering the teaching profession. Asked her favourite pursuits, Miss Newbold replied " Mathematics and hockey" but she also admits a liking for tennis".

On 21 February 1909 she landed in New York, travelling from Liverpool, on board the ship 'Baltic' to visit her grandfather David Fergusson, of Oxford Street, Berkeley, California alongside her mother and younger sister Angela (1886–1958). Angela's second husband (m. 1934) was aviator Alec Ogilvie.

== Career ==
She first taught at Godolphin School, Salisbury. Her move to Statistics was induced by her work during the First World War in the Ministry of Munitions. She studied for a MSc in the University of London, which she received in 1926, and was awarded a Doctorate in 1929. She became a member of the Medical Research Council in 1921, working on medical and industrial studies.

Ethel Newbold published 17 papers within the eight years she conducted research at the Medical Research Council. In his obituary, Major Greenwood describes her as "the best mathematical statistician and I think quite the best logician" of the group at the National Institute of Medical Research.

She was elected a Fellow of the Royal Statistical Society in 1921 and was the first woman awarded the Guy Medal in Silver in 1928, for the paper"practical Applications of Statistics of Repeated Events, particularly to Industrial Accidents" and for her other contributions to the then novel experimental study of epidemiology. She served on the Council of the Royal Statistical Society between 1928 and 1933.

== Death ==
She died at Woodend House, Hayes End, Middlesex in March 1933 after "a long illness". Her coffin left her mother's home of Imberley Lodge, East Grinstead and her funeral "took place quietly at Tunbridge Wells Cemetery in the presence of family and intimate friends on Thursday 30th March".

Major Greenwood, with whom she had worked at the Medical Research Council wrote a professional obituary for her in the Journal of the Royal Statistical Society, ending with a touching tribute.

"The pages of a scientific journal are no doubt not the place in which to expiate on the personal qualities of a friend and colleague. But I may be permitted to say, and all those who knew her will agree it is no mere obituary rhetoric, that Ethel Newbold had a genius for friendship and all whom she honoured with her friendship will remember her generosity in word and deed. She never said, much less did, an unkind thing and has influenced for good the lives of all her colleagues and assistants".

== Legacy ==
Her memorial was cleaned and repaired in 2018 by Burslem memorials at the request of the Friends of Tunbridge Wells Cemetery as part of the exhibition of Exceptional Women of Tunbridge Wells at the Cemetery, put on as part of the centenary commemorations of partial female suffrage.

== The Ethel Newbold Prize ==
In 2014, the Bernoulli Society established the Ethel Newbold Prize for research excellence in statistics. "The Ethel Newbold Prize is to be awarded to an outstanding statistical scientist for a body of work that represents excellence in research in mathematical statistics, and/or excellence in research that links developments in a substantive field to new advances in statistics." The prize is awarded biannually and includes 2500 Euros sponsored by John Wiley & Sons.

Ethel Newbold Prize Award Winners:

2015 Judith Rousseau

2017 Richard Nickl

2019 Mathias Drton

2021 Marloes Maathuis

2023 Lester Mackey

== Publications ==
- Cripps, L, Greenwood, M. and Newbold, E (1923). "A Biometric Study of the Inter-relations of 'Vital Capacity' stature, stem length and weight in a Sample of Healthy Male Adults". Biometrika. 14 (3/4): 3–4. doi:10.2307/2331816. JSTOR 2331816.
- Greenwood, M.; Newbold, E (1923). "On the Estimation of Metabolism from Determination of Carbon Dioxyde Production and on Estimation of External Work from Respiratory Metabolism". J. Hygiene. 21 (4): 3–4. doi:10.1017/s0022172400031624. PMC 2167379. PMID 20474790.
- Newbold, E (1925). "On the Excess Mortality of Males in the First Year of Life". Biometrika. 17 (3/4): 3–4. doi:10.2307/2332084. JSTOR 2332084.
- Greenwood, M.; Newbold, E (1927). "Practical Applications of Statistics of Repeated Events, particularly to Industrial Accidents". J. Royal Stat. Society. 90 (3): 487–547. doi:10.2307/2341203. JSTOR 2341203.
