= Lincoln Moses =

American biostatistician (1921–2006)

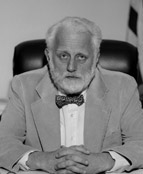

Administrator of the Energy Information Administration
- In office 1978–1980
- President: Jimmy Carter
- Preceded by: Office established
- Succeeded by: Erich Evered

Personal details
- Born: Lincoln Ellsworth Moses; 21 December 1921 Kansas City, Missouri
- Died: 17 December 2006 (aged 84) Portola Valley, California
- Education: San Bernardino Valley Junior College (AA); Stanford University (AB, PhD)

Academic background
- Doctoral advisor: Meyer Abraham Girshick

Academic work
- Discipline: Statistics
- Sub-discipline: Biostatistics
- Institutions: Columbia University; Stanford University
- Doctoral students: Galen Shorack; Myles Hollander

Lincoln Ellsworth Moses (21 December 1921 – 17 December 2006) was an American biostatistician. He was an alumnus and faculty member of Stanford University and led the Energy Information Administration from 1978 to 1980.

== Early life and education ==
Moses was a native of Kansas City, Missouri, born on 21 December 1921. He attended San Bernardino Valley Junior College from 1937 to 1939, earning an associate of arts degree, then transferred to Stanford University, where he completed a bachelor of arts in 1941. After completing his undergraduate studies, Moses served in the United States Navy as the United States entered World War II. He returned to Stanford in 1947 as one of the first three graduate students to join the university's statistics department, and became the second student to complete his doctoral dissertation. His dissertation, An Iterative Construction of the Optimum Sequential Decision Procedure when the Cost Function is Linear, was authored under the direction of Meyer Abraham Girshick, and published in 1951.

== Academic and public service career ==
Moses began his teaching career at Teachers College, Columbia University as an assistant professor in 1950, then joined Stanford's faculty two years later. As an assistant and associate professor within the Department of Statistics, he also held a joint appointment in the Department of Preventive Medicine. He was promoted to associate professor in 1955, and became a full professor in 1959. That same year, he also joined Stanford's Department of Research and Health Policy. Moses led the Department of Statistics at Stanford from 1964 to 1968, and concurrently served the first of two terms as dean of humanities and sciences between 1965 and 1968. From 1969 to 1975, he was dean of graduate studies, then returned to the humanities and sciences deanship between 1985 and 1986. Moses retired from Stanford in 1992. Outside of Stanford, Moses was appointed the first leader of the Energy Information Administration by Jimmy Carter in 1977, and served from 1978 to 1980.

== Honors and awards ==
Moses was awarded a Guggenheim Fellowship (1960), and elected to fellowship status in the American Statistical Association (1961), Institute of Mathematical Statistics (1966), American Academy of Arts and Sciences (1981), and the American Association for the Advancement of Science (1982). He was elected a member of the Institute of Medicine in 1975.

== Personal life and death ==
Moses was married twice, and had five biological children and four stepchildren. He died at home in Portola Valley, California, on 17 December 2006, aged 84.
