= Marloes Maathuis =

Dutch statistician

Marloes Henriette Maathuis (born 1978) is a Dutch statistician known for her work on causal inference using graphical models, particularly in high-dimensional data from applications in biology and epidemiology. She is a professor of statistics at ETH Zurich in Switzerland.

== Education and career ==
Maathuis is originally from Groningen, the daughter of a physician. She studied applied mathematics at the Delft University of Technology, earning a bachelor's degree in 2001 and a master's degree in 2003. Her master's program included travel to Ethiopia to study the lifetime risks of HIV-related deaths there.

With the assistance of Delft University professor Piet Groeneboom, Maathuis traveled to the University of Washington to work with Jon A. Wellner and complete her master's thesis. She stayed at the University of Washington for Ph.D. in statistics, completed in 2006, and then for an additional year as an acting assistant professor. Her doctoral dissertation, Nonparametric Estimation for Current Status Data with Competing Risks, was jointly supervised by Groeneboom and Wellner.

She joined ETH Zurich as an untenured assistant professor of applied mathematics in 2007. In 2013, following the creation of a professorship in statistics at ETH Zurich, she was named an associate professor of statistics, as an early replacement for a retiring professor. She was promoted to full professor in 2016.

== Recognition ==
Maathuis is a Fellow of the Institute of Mathematical Statistics, elected in 2017. In 2020, with Daniel Dadush, she won the Van Dantzig Award of the Netherlands Society for Statistics and Operations Research (VVSOR), "the highest Dutch award in statistics and operations research". She is the 2021 winner of the Ethel Newbold Prize of the Bernoulli Society.
