= Wald's martingale =

Exponential martingale associated to sum of iid variables

In probability theory, Wald's martingale is the name sometimes given to a martingale used to study sums of i.i.d. random variables. It is named after the mathematician Abraham Wald, who used these ideas in a series of influential publications.

Wald's martingale can be seen as discrete-time equivalent of the Doléans-Dade exponential.

== Formal statement ==
Let $(X_n)_{n \geq 1}$ be a sequence of i.i.d. random variables whose moment generating function $M: \theta \mapsto \mathbb{E}(e^{\theta X_1})$ is finite for some $\theta > 0$, and let $S_n = X_1 + \cdots + X_n$, with $S_0 = 0$. Then, the process $(W_n)_{n \geq 0}$ defined by

$$W_n = \frac{e^{\theta S_n}}{M(\theta)^n}$$

is a martingale known as Wald's martingale. In particular, $\mathbb{E}(W_n) = 1$ for all $n \geq 0$.

== See also ==
- Martingale
- geometric Brownian motion
- Doléans-Dade exponential
- Wald's equation
