= Galen Shorack =

American statistician (born 1939)

Galen Richard Shorack (born 14 May 1939) is an American statistician.

Shorack completed his bachelor's and master's degrees in mathematics at the University of Oregon in 1960 and 1962, respectively. He then obtained a PhD in statistics from Stanford University in 1965, authoring the doctoral dissertation Nonparametric Tests and Estimation of Scale in the Two Sample Problem under the direction of Lincoln E. Moses. Shorack joined the University of Washington faculty upon earning his doctorate in 1965, and remained on the faculty until 2015, when he retired and was granted emeritus status.

Shorack was elected to fellowship of the Institute of Mathematical Statistics in 1974.

== Books ==
- Shorack, Galen R.; Wellner, Jon A. (1986). Empirical Processes With Applications to Statistics. New York: Wiley. ISBN 978-0471867258. Review
- Shorack, Galen R. (2006). Probability for Statisticians. New York: Springer. ISBN 9780387227603.
