= Lorden's inequality =

Mathematics concept

In probability theory, Lorden's inequality is a bound for the moments of overshoot for a stopped sum of random variables, first published by Gary Lorden in 1970. Overshoots play a central role in renewal theory.

== Statement of inequality ==
Let X_{1}, X_{2}, ... be independent and identically distributed positive random variables and define the sum S_{n} = X_{1} + X_{2} + ... + X_{n}. Consider the first time S_{n} exceeds a given value b and at that time compute R_{b} = S_{n} − b. R_{b} is called the overshoot or excess at b. Lorden's inequality states that the expectation of this overshoot is bounded as

$$\operatorname E (R_b) \leq \frac{\operatorname E (X^2)}{\operatorname E(X)}.$$

=== Proof ===
Three proofs are known due to Lorden, Carlsson and Nerman and Chang.

== See also ==
- Wald's equation
