= Nilanjan Chatterjee =

Indian-American Biostatistician

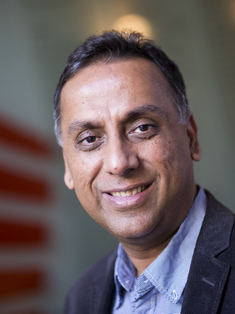
- Born: c. 1972 (age 53–54); Kolkata, India
- Citizenship: American
- Education: University of Washington (PhD); Indian Statistical Institute (M.S) (BS); Ballygunge Government High School
- Awards: Mortimer Spiegelman Award (2010); Snedecor Award (2011); COPSS Presidents' Award (2011); Bloomberg Distinguished Professorships (2015)
- Scientific career
- Fields: Epidemiology; Statistics; Biostatistics; Oncology
- Workplaces: Johns Hopkins University (current); National Institutes of Health (1999-2015)
- Thesis: Semiparametric inference based on estimating equations in regressions models for two phase outcome dependent sampling
- Academic advisors: Norman Breslow; Jon A. Wellner

Nilanjan Chatterjee is an Indian-American statistician who is the Bloomberg Distinguished Professor of Biostatistics and Genetic Epidemiology at Johns Hopkins University. He also has appointments in the Department of Biostatistics in the Bloomberg School of Public Health and in the Department of Oncology in the Sidney Kimmel Comprehensive Cancer Center. He was formerly the chief of the Biostatistics Branch of the National Cancer Institute's Division of Cancer Epidemiology and Genetics.

== Biography ==
Chatterjee was born in Kolkata, India, to parents Aditya Nath and Pranati Chatterjee. He attended Ballygunge Government High School and Saint Xavier's College. He received his bachelor's degree in statistics from the Indian Statistical Institute in 1993, and his master's in 1995. Chatterjee earned his PhD in Statistics from the University of Washington, Seattle in 1999. His PhD thesis, titled "Semiparametric Inference Based on Estimating Equations in Regression Models for Two-Phase Outcome-Dependent Sampling," was advised by Norman Breslow and Jon A. Wellner.

Chatterjee joined the National Cancer Institute (NCI) as a postdoctoral fellow in the biostatistics branch of the Division of Cancer Epidemiology and Genetics (DCEG) in 1999, and became a tenure-track investigator in 2001 and a senior investigator in 2004. He served as chief of the biostatistics branch from 2008 until 2015. He remains a Special Volunteer at the NCI.

== Research ==
Chatterjee is known for his work in quantitative genetics, cancer research, big data, statistical methodology, genomics, gene-environment interaction, genetic association and genome-wide association studies.

Chatterjee developed a model for predicting breast cancer risk that combines individual-level data on risk factors such as smoking and age with genetic variations associated with higher risk of breast cancer. He led a large collaboration of experts from the Johns Hopkins School of Medicine, the Bloomberg School of Public Health, and the Whiting School of Engineering that used big data and machine learning to develop tools for autism risk prediction and intervention.

Chatterjee has participated in the Johns Hopkins Individualized Health Initiative (Hopkins inHealth), which aims to improve individual and population health outcomes through innovative collaborations among experts in biomedical and data science. Chatterjee's contributions to the initiative involved research on using genetic markers for risk prediction models as well as their applications to personalized medicine and public health interventions.

Through his quantitative studies of gene-environment and gene-gene interactions, Chatterjee has also made fundamental contributions to theoretical and methodological approaches in epidemiology and biostatistics. Using statistics from genome-wide association studies to appraise the number of DNA variations that contribute to different physical traits and diseases, Chatterjee and colleagues developed a method for estimating the number of individual samples needed in order to identify genetic bases of traits, such as height or body mass index (BMI), or diseases, such as diabetes or bipolar disorder. This method can be used for designing genetic studies and understanding genetic risk prediction.

== Awards ==
- Fellow of the American Statistical Association (2008)
- Mortimer Spiegelman Award (2010)
- George W. Snedecor Award (2011)
- COPSS Presidents' Award (2011)
- Gertrude Cox Award (2011)
- Elected Member of the American Epidemiologic Society (2012)

== Publications ==
Chatterjee has more than 40,000 citations in Google Scholar and an h-index of 98.

- Pubmed citations
- Google Scholar citations

Highly Cited Articles (more than 1000 citations)

- 2010 with EK Speliotes, CJ Willer, SI Berndt, KL Monda, G Thorleifsson, AU Jackson, et al, Association analyses of 249,796 individuals reveal 18 new loci associated with body mass index, in: Nature Genetics. Vol. 42, nº 11; 937-948.
- 2010 with HL Allen, K Estrada, G Lettre, SI Bernd, MN Weedon, F Rivadeneira, et al, Hundreds of variants clustered in genomic loci and biological pathways affect human height, in: Nature. Vol. 467, nº 7317; 832-838.
- 2007 with DJ Hunter, P Kraft, KB Jacobs, DG Cox, M Yeager, SE Hankinson, A genome-wide association study identifies alleles in FGFR2 associated with risk of sporadic postmenopausal breast cancer, in: Nature Genetics. Vol. 39, nº 7; 870-874.
- 2007 with M Yeager, N Orr, RB Hayes, KB Jacobs, P Kraft, S Wacholder, et al, Genome-wide association study of prostate cancer identifies a second risk locus at 8q24, in: Nature Genetics. Vol. 39, nº 5; 645-649.
- 2008 with G Thomas, KB Jacobs, M Yeager, P Kraft, S Wacholder, N Orr, K Yu, et al, Multiple loci identified in a genome-wide association study of prostate cancer, in: Nature Genetics. Vol. 40, nº 3; 310-315.
