= Chernoff face =

Human-face shaped display of data

This example shows Chernoff faces for lawyers' ratings of twelve judges

Chernoff faces are a data visualization method invented by applied mathematician, statistician, and physicist Herman Chernoff in 1973. It displays a set of multivariate data in the shape of a human face, where individual parts, such as eyes, ears, mouth, and nose, represent values of the variables by their shape, size, placement, and orientation.

The idea behind using faces is that humans readily recognize them and notice small changes. Chernoff faces handle each variable differently. Because the features of the faces vary in perceived importance, the way variables are mapped to features should be carefully chosen (e.g., eye size and eyebrow slant have been found to carry significant weight). Robert J. K. Jacob used Chernoff faces to encode multivariate data for rapid visual parsing.

== Detail ==
Chernoff faces themselves can be plotted on a standard X–Y graph; the faces can be positioned X–Y based on the two most important variables, and then the faces themselves represent the rest of the dimensions for each item. Edward Tufte, presenting such a diagram, says that this kind of Chernoff-face graph would "reduce well, maintaining legibility even with individual areas of 0.05 square inches as shown ... with cartoon faces and even numbers becoming data measures, we would appear to have reached the limit of graphical economy of presentation, imagination, and let it be admitted, eccentricity".

== Extensions ==
=== Asymmetrical faces ===
In 1981, Bernhard Flury and Hans Riedwyl suggested "asymmetrical" Chernoff faces; since a face has vertical symmetry (around the y axis), the left side of the face is identical to the right and is basically wasted space – a point also made by Tufte. One could have the 18 variables that specify the left be one set of data, but use a different set of data for the right side of the face, allowing one face to depict 35 different measurements. They present results showing that such asymmetrical faces are useful in visualizing databases of identical twins, for example, and are useful in grouping as pairs of Chernoff faces would be.

=== Chernoff fish ===
Julie Rodriguez and Piotr Kaczmarek use "Chernoff fish", where various parts of a cartoon fish are used to encode different financial details.

== In literature ==
In Peter Watts' novel Blindsight (2006), a transhuman character is seen using a variant of Chernoff faces. This use is explained by the character as a more efficient method of representing data, for a large portion of the human brain is devoted to facial recognition.

In the 2014 sci-fi short story "Degrees of Freedom" by Karl Schroeder, Chernoff faces make a prominent appearance as a future technology, supporting the communication of aggregate sentiment and perspective.

== Other sources ==
- Chernoff, Herman (1973). "The Use of Faces to Represent Points in K-Dimensional Space Graphically" (PDF). Journal of the American Statistical Association. 68 (342). American Statistical Association: 361–368. doi:10.2307/2284077. JSTOR 2284077. Archived from the original (PDF) on April 15, 2012.
