= Florentina Bunea =

Romanian-American statistician

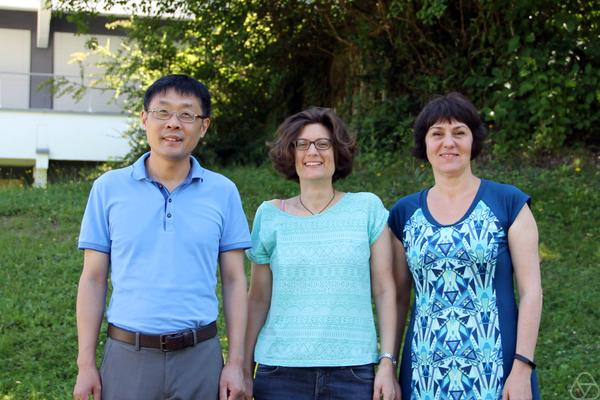
Left to right: Huibin Zhou, Angelika Rohde, and Florentina Bunea organized the 2018 MFO Workshop Matrix Estimation Meets Statistical Network Analysis.

Florentina Bunea is a Romanian-American statistician, interested in machine learning, the theory of empirical processes, and high-dimensional statistics. She is a professor at Cornell University.

== Education and career ==
Bunea earned Bachelor's and master's degrees at the University of Bucharest in 1989 and 1991. After working as an assistant professor at the Politehnica University of Bucharest from 1991 to 1995, she returned to graduate study at the University of Washington. She earned her Ph.D. there in 2000; her dissertation, A Model Selection Approach to Partially Linear Regression, was supervised by Jon A. Wellner.

She joined the statistics faculty at Florida State University in 2000, and moved to Cornell University in 2011. At Cornell, she is a faculty member in the Department of Statistics and Data Science, a member of the Center for Applied Mathematics and the Machine Learning Group in Cornell Computing and Information Science (CIS).

== Recognition ==
In 2017, Bunea was elected as a Fellow of the Institute of Mathematical Statistics.
