= Alec Ogilvie =

British aviation pioneer (1882–1962)

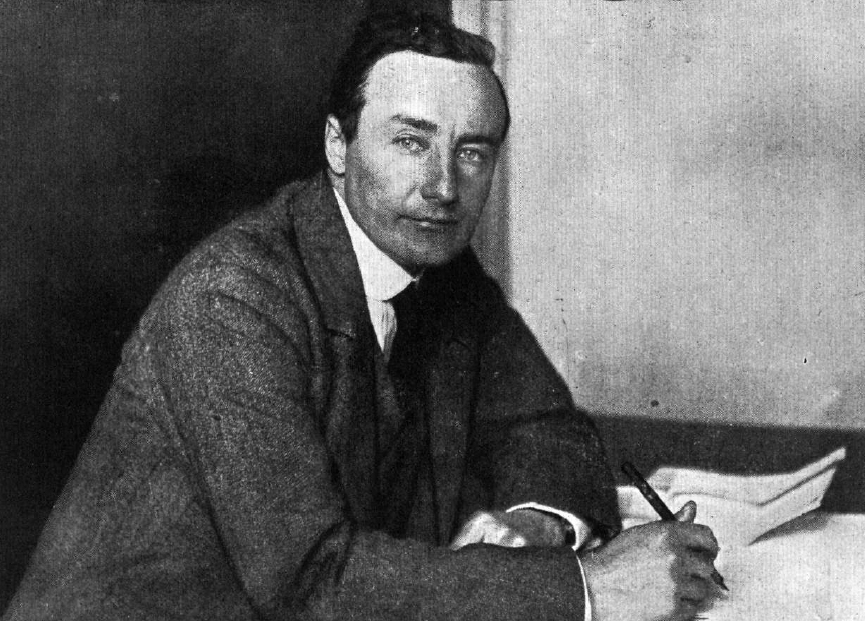
- Alec Ogilvie at his desk in 1919
- Born: 8 June 1882; Marylebone, London, England
- Died: 18 June 1962 (aged 80); Ringwood, Hampshire
- Relatives: Wife Angela Le Cren, née Newbold (1886–1958) m. 1934 Sister in law Ethel Newbold Brother in law Charles Joseph Newbold
- Military career
- Allegiance: United Kingdom
- Branch: Royal Navy (1915–1918); Royal Air Force (1918–1919)
- Rank: Wing Commander (RNAS); Lieutenant-Colonel (RAF)
- Unit: Royal Naval Air Service
- Conflicts: First World War
- Awards: Commander of the Order of the British Empire
- Other work: Consulting aeronautical engineer

Lieutenant-Colonel Alexander Ogilvie CBE (8 June 1882 – 18 June 1962) was an early British aviation pioneer, a friend of the Wright Brothers and only the seventh British person to qualify as a pilot. During World War I Ogilvie served with the Royal Naval Air Service before transferring to the Royal Air Force on its creation in 1918. During the War he was chiefly employed in technical posts and after the War he worked as a consulting aeronautical engineer.

== Early life ==
Alexander Ogilivie was born in 1882 in the Marylebone district of London. He was educated at Rugby School and Cambridge University.

== Early aviator ==
In 1908 Ogilvie watched Wilbur Wright carry out a demonstration flight in France and within two months he had ordered a Wright Biplane for himself. Before the biplane was delivered in 1909 he practised flying at Friston, Sussex using a glider. Ogilvie established a flying base on Camber Sands near Rye, Sussex and took part in a number of aviation meetings around the country. He joined the Royal Aero Club on 11 May 1909 and gained only the seventh Royal Aero Club aviator's certificate on 24 May 1910. In 1910 using a Wright racing biplane he entered the Gordon Bennett competition at Belmont Park in New York, he was placed third in the competition (for which he was awarded the Silver medal of the Royal Aero Club) and brought the aircraft back to England. The following year he had more success in that race, coming in fourth in his Wright at an average 55 mph. In 1912, Ogilvie invented an airspeed indicator which was later adopted by the Royal Naval Air Service (RNAS). In 1911 he joined Orville Wright at Kitty Hawk, North Carolina, United States during Wright's experiments with soaring making several flights. He continued to use a Wright aircraft up to 1914 including in 1913 flying H. G. Wells as a passenger.

== First World War ==
On 19 February 1915 Ogilvie was commissioned as an RNAS officer in the rank of squadron commander. Ogilvie initially was given responsibility for overseeing flying training at the Naval Flying School, Eastchurch. On 5 April 1916 he took command of the aircraft repair depot at Dunkirk, and was promoted acting wing commander on 31 December 1916. On 5 March 1917 he became a member of the Air Board, eventually serving as controller of the technical department. The rank of wing commander was confirmed on 30 June 1917. In early 1918, Ogilvie reported on flight tests of the Sopwith Snipe, stating that "its flying qualities are bad"; however, he was overruled by Trenchard and Brooke-Popham and orders were placed. On 1 April 1918, along with all other RNAS personnel, Ogilvie transferred to the newly established Royal Air Force in the rank of major (temporary lieutenant-colonel). A note in his new RAF service record states, "[He has] flown most types of aircraft except single seaters." He was injured in a flying accident on 8 June 1918.

== Post-war ==
Ogilvie resigned from the Air Board in 1919, being placed on the RAF unemployed list on 10 March. He then worked as a consulting aeronautical engineer under the name "Ogilvie and Partners", which in 1919 became the Limited company "Ogilvie and Partners Ltd.", of which he was "Permanent governing director and chairman". He subsequently moved to Australia for some years.

== Personal life ==
In September 1934 he married Angela Le Cren, née Newbold (1886–1958) in East Grinstead, Sussex. Her sister was the statistician and epidemiologist Ethel Newbold and her brother was rugby player and chemist Charles Joseph Newbold. Ogilvie died, aged 80, on 18 June 1962 at his home in Ringwood, Hampshire.

== Honours and awards ==
- 12 May 1917 – Acting Wing-Commander Alec Ogilvie RNAS was mentioned in dispatches.
- 1 January 1918 – Wing-Commander Alec Ogilvie, RNAS, head of aeroplane design section, Air Board technical section, is appointed Officer of the Order of the British Empire.
- 1 January 1919 – Lieut-Col Alec Ogilvie, OBE is appointed Commander of the Order of the British Empire in recognition for valuable service rendered in connection with the war.
