= Lester Mackey =

American computer scientist and statistician

Lester Wayne Mackey II
- Born: Long Island, New York, US
- Education: University of California, Berkeley; Princeton
- Scientific career
- Fields: Machine learning Computer science Statistics
- Workplaces: Microsoft Research; Stanford University
- Thesis: Matrix Factorization and Matrix Concentration (2012)
- Doctoral advisor: Michael I. Jordan
- Website: https://web.stanford.edu/~lmackey

Lester Mackey is an American computer scientist and statistician. He is a principal researcher at Microsoft Research and an adjunct professor at Stanford University. Mackey develops machine learning methods, models, and theory for large-scale learning tasks driven by applications from climate forecasting, healthcare, and the social good. He was named a 2023 MacArthur Fellow.

== Early life and education ==
Mackey grew up on Long Island. He has said that, as a teenager, the Ross Mathematics Program in number theory introduced him to proof-based mathematics, where he learned about induction and rigorous proof. He got his first taste of academic research at the Research Science Institute. He joined Princeton University as an undergraduate student, where he earned his BSE in Computer Science. There he conducted research with Maria Klawe and David Walker. Mackey was a graduate student at the University of California, Berkeley, where he earned a PhD in Computer Science (2012) and an MA in Statistics (2011). At Berkeley, his dissertation, advised by Michael I. Jordan, included work on sparse principal components analysis (PCA) for gene expression modeling, low-rank matrix completion for recommender systems, robust matrix factorization for video surveillance, and concentration inequalities for matrices. After Berkeley, he joined Stanford University, first as a postdoctoral fellow working with Emmanuel Candès and then as an assistant professor of statistics and, by courtesy, computer science. At Stanford, he created the Statistics for Social Good working group.

== Research and career ==
In 2016, Mackey joined Microsoft Research as a researcher and was appointed as an adjunct professor at Stanford University. He was made a principal researcher in 2019.

Mackey's early work developed a method to predict progression rates of people with ALS. He used the PRO-ACT database of clinical trial data and Bayesian inference to predict disease prognosis. He has also developed machine learning models for subseasonal climate and weather forecasting, to more accurately predict temperature and precipitation 2-6 weeks in advance. His models outperform the operational, physics-based dynamical models used by the United States Bureau of Reclamation.

== Awards and honors ==
- 2003 Intel Science Talent Search 6th Place
- Namesake of minor planet 15093 Lestermackey
- 2006 Barry M. Goldwater Scholarship
- 2007 Computing Research Association Outstanding Undergraduate Award Winner
- 2007 Moses Taylor Pyne Honor Prize
- 2009 Second Place in the $1 million Netflix Prize competition for collaborative filtering
- 2010 Best Student Paper Award, International Conference on Machine Learning
- 2012 First Place in the ALS Prediction Prize4Life Challenge for predicting Lou Gehrig's disease progression
- 2019 Winner of U.S. Bureau of Reclamation's Subseasonal Climate Forecast Rodeo
- 2022 Elected to the Committee of Presidents of Statistical Societies Leadership Academy
- 2022 Outstanding Paper Award, NeurIPS
- 2023 Ethel Newbold Prize
- 2023 Elected Fellow of the Institute of Mathematical Statistics
- 2023 MacArthur Fellowship
- 2024 Elected Fellow of the American Statistical Association

== Selected publications ==
- Luke de Oliveira; Michael Kagan; Lester Mackey; Benjamin Nachman; Ariel Schwartzman (July 2016). "Jet-images — deep learning edition". Journal of High Energy Physics. 2016 (7). arXiv:1511.05190. Bibcode:2016JHEP...07..069D. doi:10.1007/jhep07(2016)069. ISSN 1126-6708. OSTI 1271300. S2CID 30627853. Wikidata Q123016814.
- Neil Zhenqiang Gong; Ameet Talwalkar; Lester Mackey; Ling Huang; Eui Chul Richard Shin; Emil Stefanov; Elaine (Runting) Shi; Dawn Song (April 2014). "Joint Link Prediction and Attribute Inference Using a Social-Attribute Network". ACM transactions on intelligent systems and technology. 5 (2): 1–20. doi:10.1145/2594455. ISSN 2157-6904. S2CID 7277785. Wikidata Q123016825.
- Lester W. Mackey (2009). "Deflation Methods for Sparse PCA" (PDF). Advances in Neural Information Processing Systems 21. Advances in Neural Information Processing Systems. Wikidata Q77680580.
