= Charles Joseph Newbold =

England international rugby union player

- Born: Charles Joseph Newbold; 12 January 1881 Tunbridge Wells, England
- Died: 26 October 1946 (aged 65) Brentford, England
- School: Rose Hill; Uppingham School
- University: Gonville and Caius College, Cambridge

Rugby union career
- Position: Forward
Amateur team(s)
Years	Team	Apps	(Points)
- Cambridge University R.U.F.C.
–	Blackheath F.C.		
–	Barbarian F.C.		
International career
Years	Team	Apps	(Points)
1904-1905	England	6	(0)

Lt. Colonel Charles Joseph Newbold DSO (12 January 1881 – 26 October 1946) was an English rugby union international who played club rugby for Cambridge University and Blackheath. He played six international games for England between 1904 and 1905. During the First World War he served the British Army in the Royal Engineers.

== Early life ==
Newbold was born in 1881 in Tunbridge Wells, England. One of eleven children, he was the second son of William Newbold (1828–1900) and Eleanor Isabel Newbold, née Fergusson (1862–1942) of East Grinstead, and was educated at Rose Hill in Tunbridge Wells and then Uppingham School. He entered Gonville and Caius College, Cambridge in 1900 and was awarded his BA in 1903. On leaving Cambridge in 1904 he joined brewing firm Guinness, becoming one of their early chemists at the Guinness Research Laboratory. His eldest sister Ethel Newbold (1882–1933) was a noted statistician and epidemiologist.

== Rugby career ==
Newbold first came to note as a rugby player when he represented Cambridge University and won two sporting Blues, in 1902 and 1903. He won his first international cap while still a Cambridge player, representing England in the 1904 Home Nations Championship. He played in all three games of the 1904 campaign and was reselected for the 1905 Championship. After leaving university he joined Blackheath, and became a member of the invitational tourists, The Barbarians in 1903.

== Military career and later life ==
After the outbreak of World War I, Newbold joined the Royal Engineers and reached the rank of lieutenant colonel. He was mentioned in dispatches on three occasions and was awarded the Distinguished Service Order. On 27 September 1924, he married Daphne Gertrude Persse, who served with the British Red Cross Society in both the First and Second World War. In 1925 Charles and Daphne moved to Bulawayo where they lived until early 1939 when they returned to England.

In 1941 Newold became the managing director of Guinness; and from 1942 to 1945 he was the chairman of the Brewers' Society.
