= Herman Chernoff =

American mathematician (1923–2026)

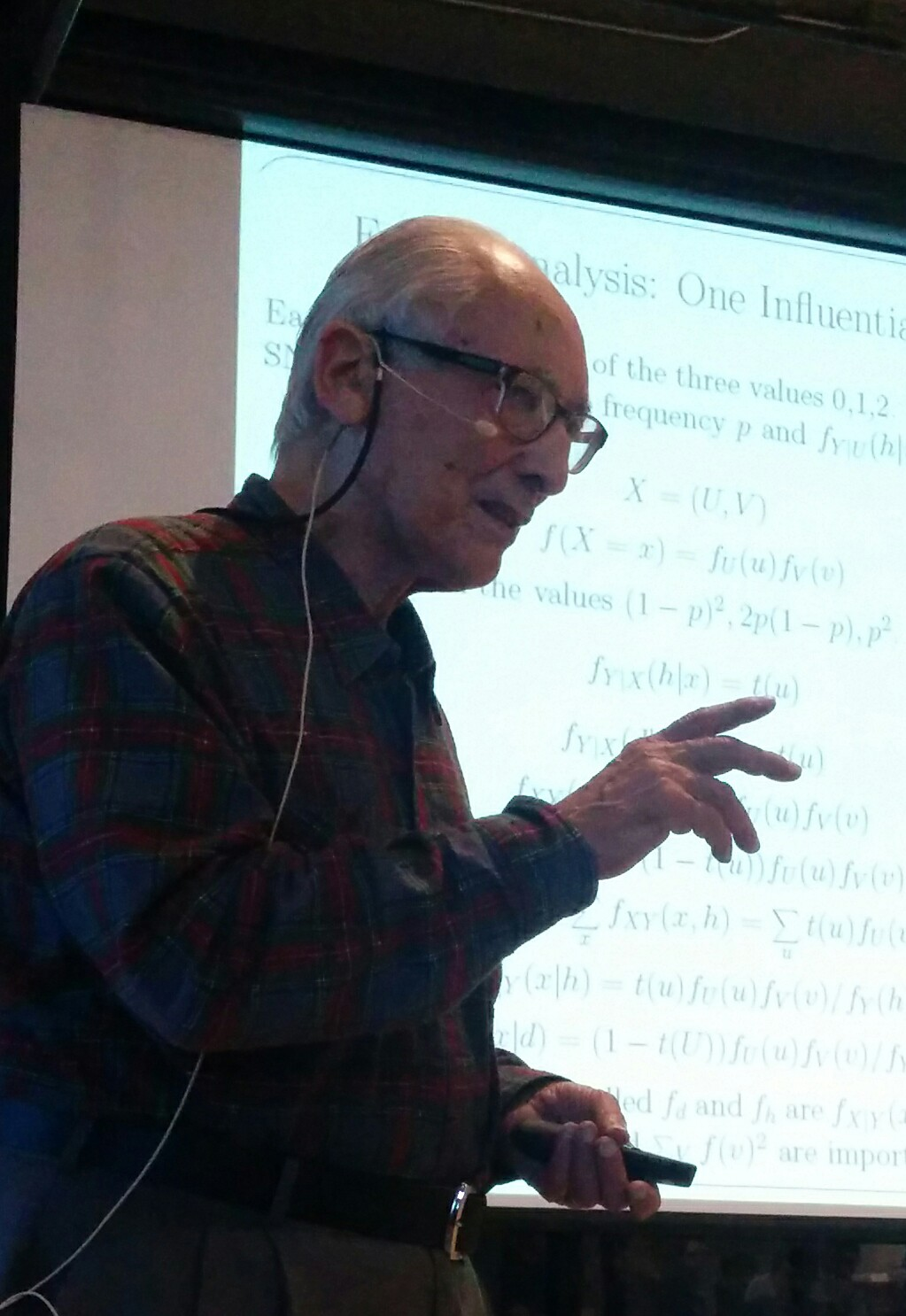
- Chernoff speaking in 2015
- Born: July 1, 1923; New York City, U.S.
- Died: July 6, 2026 (aged 103); Boston, Massachusetts, U.S.
- Education: City College of New York; Brown University
- Known for: Chernoff bound; Chernoff's distribution; Chernoff face
- Awards: Fellow, American Academy of Arts and Sciences (1974); Member, National Academy of Sciences (1980); Wilks Memorial Award (1987); Fellow, American Mathematical Society (2012)
- Scientific career
- Fields: Mathematics; Statistics; Physics
- Workplaces: University of Illinois Urbana–Champaign; Stanford; MIT; Harvard
- Thesis: Studentization in testing of hypotheses (1948)
- Doctoral advisor: Abraham Wald
- Notable students: Stuart Geman; Joseph B. Kadane

Herman Chernoff (July 1, 1923 – July 6, 2026) was an American applied mathematician, statistician and physicist. He was a professor at University of Illinois Urbana-Champaign, Stanford, MIT, and at Harvard University.

== Early life and education ==
Herman Chernoff's parents were Pauline and Max Chernoff, Jewish immigrants from the Russian Empire. He studied at Townsend Harris High School and earned a B.S. in mathematics from the City College of New York in 1943. He attended graduate school at Brown University, earning an M.Sc. in applied mathematics in 1945, and a Ph.D. in applied mathematics in 1948 under the supervision of Abraham Wald.

== Recognition ==
Chernoff became a fellow of the American Academy of Arts and Sciences in 1974, and was elected to the National Academy of Sciences in 1980. In 1987, he was selected for the Wilks Memorial Award by the American Statistical Association, and in 2012, he was made an inaugural fellow of the American Mathematical Society.

== Personal life and death ==
Chernoff met his future wife, Judith, when they were both graduate students at Brown University in 1945, and married her in 1947. She died at the age of 98 on June 9, 2023. At the time of her death they were believed to be the oldest couple living in Massachusetts.

Chernoff turned 100 on July 1, 2023, and died in Boston, Massachusetts, on July 6, 2026, at the age of 103.

== See also ==
- Chernoff bound (also known as Chernoff's inequality)
- Chernoff face
- Chernoff's distribution
