= Charles Wellner =

U.S. Forest Service scientist

Charles A. Wellner
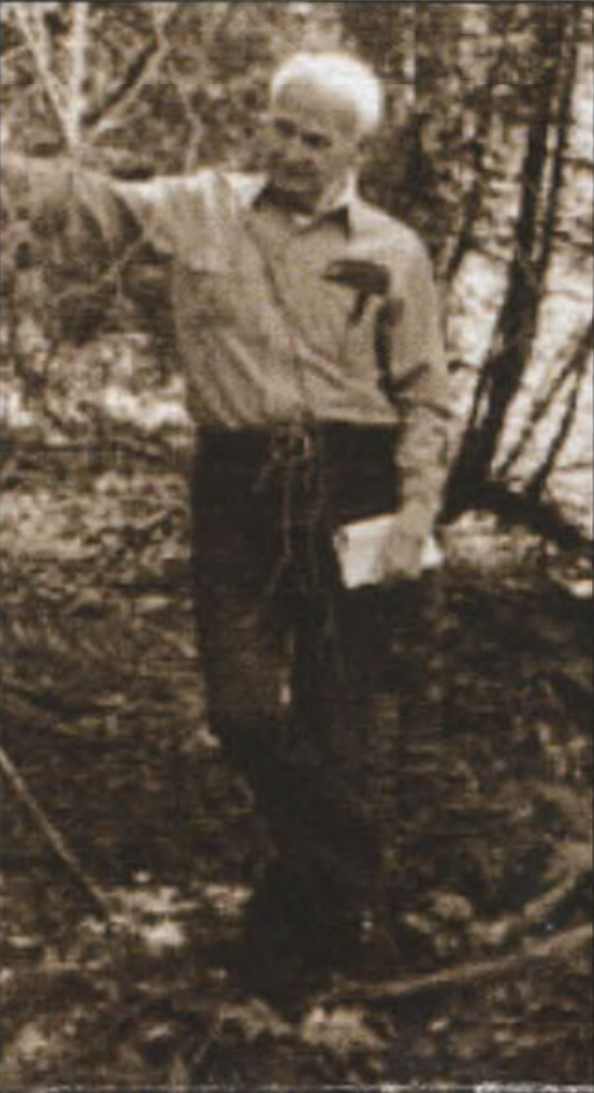
- Born: January 3, 1911; Enid, Oklahoma, United States
- Died: June 5, 2001 (aged 90); Moscow, Idaho, United States
- Education: University of Idaho (BS); Yale University (MS)
- Occupations: Silviculturist; researcher
- Employer: United States Forest Service
- Spouse: Ethel Wolf (m. 1939; died 1969)
- Children: 4, including Jon A. Wellner
- Awards: Full list

Charles August (Chuck) Wellner (January 3, 1911 – June 5, 2001) was an American research scientist at the United States Forest Service for over 40 years. In his retirement, he continued with the Forest Service as a volunteer and helped establish the majority of the research natural areas in Idaho.

== Early life ==
Wellner was born on January 3, 1911, in Enid, Oklahoma. His parents were August and Adelia (Anderson) Wellner. He grew up in Twin Falls, Idaho where he graduated from Twin Falls High school in 1928.

== Education and career ==
Wellner attended the University of Idaho in 1929 and graduated in 1933 with a BS in Forestry. That year, he was hired by the United States Forest Service as a silviculturist. He took an educational leave from 1937-1938 to earn his MS in Forestry from the Yale School of Forestry, graduating magna cum laude. From 1942-1946, Wellner was an aerology officer in the U.S. Navy, serving on the U.S.S. Boxer. Wellner's career with the Forest Services lasted until 1973, during which time he served as division chief and assistant director of the Northern Rocky Mountain and Intermountain Forest and Range Experiment stations.

After his retirement, he continued as a volunteer with the Forest Service for 18 years. With Emeritus Professor Fred Johnson, he established the Idaho Natural Areas Coordinating Committee (INACC), a group of volunteer scientists responsible for identifying research natural areas (RNAs) for the conversation of biodiversity in Idaho. Wellner was largely responsible for the addition of 80 new RNAs in Idaho by the 1990s.

A tireless advocate for experimental forests, Wellner once refused to carry out an order to close down the Priest River Experimental Forest in Idaho. Wellner directed that his ashes be scattered over the Priest River Experimental Forest "so I can keep an eye on things."

== Legacy ==
In 2005, the Forest Service established the Wellner Cliffs Research Natural Area in honor of Wellner. At the time, it was the only RNA in Idaho to be named after a person.

== Personal life and death ==
Wellner married Ethel Wolf in 1939 in Moscow, Idaho. They had four children. Wellner died in Moscow on June 5, 2001.

== Awards and honors ==
- Superior Service Award from the U.S. Department of Agriculture (1962 and 1972)
- Oak Leaf Award from the Nature Conservancy (1982)
- Chevron Conservation Award (1989)
- George B. Fell Award from the Natural Areas Association (1991)
- Elected as a fellow of the Society of American Foresters (1985)
- Honorary doctorate from the University of Idaho (1989)
