= James C. Bean =

American college administrator

James Carl "Jim" Bean is an American college administrator from Oregon. From 2015 to 2020, he served as provost and senior vice president for academic affairs at Northeastern University in Boston, Massachusetts. He previously served for 5 years as Senior Associate Dean for Academic Programs at the Lundquist College of Business, and also senior vice president and provost at the University of Oregon from 2008 to 2013.

== Career ==
Bean was previously the dean of the Lundquist College of Business at the University of Oregon where he served as the Harry B. Miller Professor of Business from 2004 to 2008. Additionally, he served as an administrator for 24 years at the University of Michigan. He served as the associate dean for graduate education and international programs in the College of Engineering, and associate dean for academic affairs. He is a member of the board of trustees at Harvey Mudd College.

Bean was previously president of the Institute for Operations Research and the Management Sciences. He remains a charter fellow of the institute. In 2010 he was awarded the George E. Kimball Medal. He lives in Portland, Oregon.

== Education ==
Bean earned a B.S. in Mathematics from Harvey Mudd College in 1977 and an M.S. in Operations Research from Stanford University in 1979. He obtained a Ph.D. in Operations Research from Stanford in 1981 with thesis An Additive Algorithm for the Multiple Choice Integer Program written under the direction of Frederick Stanton Hillier.
