= Erwin Bolthausen =

Swiss mathematician (born 1945)

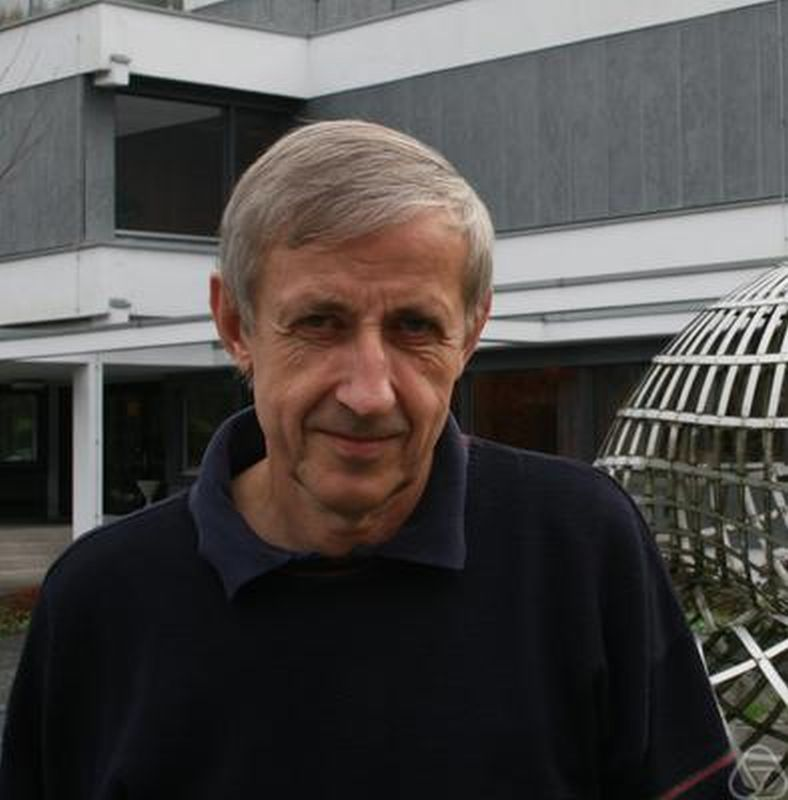
- Bolthausen in Oberwolfach 2010
- Born: October 15, 1945 (age 80); Rohr, Aargau, Switzerland

Academic background
- Education: ETH Zurich
- Doctoral advisor: Beno Eckmann

Academic work
- Institutions: University of Konstanz; Goethe University Frankfurt; Technische Universität Berlin; University of Zurich
- Doctoral students: Peter Bühlmann

Erwin Bolthausen (born 15 October 1945 in Rohr, Aargau) is a Swiss mathematician, specializing in probability theory, statistics, and stochastic models in mathematical physics.

== Education and career ==
Bolthausen received his doctorate in mathematics under Beno Eckmann in 1973 from ETH Zurich. Bolthausen's thesis was entitled Einfache Isomorphietypen in lokalisierten Kategorien und einfache Homotopietypen von Polyeder (Simple isomorphic types in localized categories and simple homotopy types of polyhedra). In 1978 he completed his habilitation at the University of Konstanz and was then an associate professor of mathematics at the Goethe University Frankfurt for the academic year 1978–1979. From 1979 to 1990 he was a full professor at Technische Universität Berlin. Since 1990 he is a full professor at the University of Zurich, where he headed the Institut für Mathematik from 1998 to 2001.

In the early years of his career Bolthausen did research on martingale convergence theorems, combinatorial limit theorems, and the large deviations theory. Later in his career he dealt with stochastic models in mathematical physics, such as wandering in random media, phenomena related to random interfaces (entropic repulsion, wetting phenomena), spin glasses, and polymers in random media.

Bolthausen has been a member of the German National Academy of Sciences Leopoldina since 2007. From 1995 to 2000 he was a member of the council of the Mathematisches Forschungsinstitut Oberwolfach. He is since 2002 a member of the scientific advisory board of the École d'Eté de Probabilités de Saint-Flour and since 1994 a member of the Board of Trustees of the Swiss National Science Foundation.

He was an associate editor from 1987 to 1989 for the Annals of Statistics and from 1988 to 1993 for the Annals of Probability. For the journal Probability Theory and Related Fields he was editor-in-chief from 1994 to 2000 and is an associate editor since 2000.

Bolthausen was in 2002 in Beijing an invited speaker with talk Localization-delocalization phenomena for random interfaces at the International Congress of Mathematicians and in 1996 in Budapest with talk Large deviations and perturbations of random walks and random surfaces at the European Congress of Mathematicians.

== Selected publications ==
=== Articles ===
- Bolthausen, Erwin (1976). "On a Functional Central Limit Theorem for Random Walks Conditioned to Stay Positive". The Annals of Probability. 4 (3): 480–485. doi:10.1214/aop/1176996098. ISSN 0091-1798.
- Bolthausen, E. (1980). "The Berry-Esseen theorem for functionals of discrete Markov chains". Zeitschrift für Wahrscheinlichkeitstheorie und Verwandte Gebiete. 54 (1): 59–73. doi:10.1007/BF00535354. ISSN 0044-3719. S2CID 120031194.
- Bolthausen, E. (1982). "The Berry-Esseén theorem for strongly mixing Harris recurrent Markov chains". Zeitschrift für Wahrscheinlichkeitstheorie und Verwandte Gebiete. 60 (3): 283–289. doi:10.1007/BF00535716. ISSN 0044-3719. S2CID 119429540.
- Bolthausen, E. (1982). "Exact Convergence Rates in Some Martingale Central Limit Theorems". The Annals of Probability. 10 (3): 672–688. doi:10.1214/aop/1176993776. ISSN 0091-1798.
- Bolthausen, Erwin (1982). "On the Central Limit Theorem for Stationary Mixing Random Fields". The Annals of Probability. 10 (4): 1047–1050. doi:10.1214/aop/1176993726. JSTOR 2243560.
- Bolthausen, E. (1984). "An estimate of the remainder in a combinatorial central limit theorem". Zeitschrift für Wahrscheinlichkeitstheorie und Verwandte Gebiete. 66 (3): 379–386. doi:10.1007/BF00533704. ISSN 0044-3719. S2CID 121725342.
- Bolthausen, E. (1986). "Laplace approximations for sums of independent random vectors". Probability Theory and Related Fields. 72 (2): 305–318. doi:10.1007/BF00699109. ISSN 0178-8051. S2CID 113405906.
- Bolthausen, Erwin (1989). "A note on the diffusion of directed polymers in a random environment". Communications in Mathematical Physics. 123 (4): 529–534. Bibcode:1989CMaPh.123..529B. doi:10.1007/BF01218584. ISSN 0010-3616. S2CID 121633690.
- Bolthausen, Erwin; Deuschel, Jean-Dominique; Zeitouni, Ofer (1995). "Entropic repulsion of the lattice free field". Communications in Mathematical Physics. 170 (2): 417–443. Bibcode:1995CMaPh.170..417B. doi:10.1007/BF02108336. ISSN 0010-3616. S2CID 122181802.
- Bolthausen, Erwin; den Hollander, Frank (1997). "Localization transition for a polymer near an interface". The Annals of Probability. 25 (3): 1334–1366. doi:10.1214/aop/1024404516. hdl:2066/28934.
- Bolthausen, E.; Sznitman, A.-S. (1998). "On Ruelle's Probability Cascades and an Abstract Cavity Method". Communications in Mathematical Physics. 197 (2): 247–276. Bibcode:1998CMaPh.197..247B. doi:10.1007/s002200050450. ISSN 0010-3616. S2CID 122922461.
- Bolthausen, Erwin; Goldsheid, Ilya (2000). "Recurrence and Transience of Random Walks in Random Environments on a Strip". Communications in Mathematical Physics. 214 (2): 429–447. Bibcode:2000CMaPh.214..429B. doi:10.1007/s002200000279. ISSN 0010-3616. S2CID 122496806.
- van den Berg, M.; Bolthausen, E.; den Hollander, F. (2001). "Moderate Deviations for the Volume of the Wiener Sausage". The Annals of Mathematics. 153 (2): 355. arXiv:math/0103238. Bibcode:2001math......3238V. doi:10.2307/2661345. ISSN 0003-486X. JSTOR 2661345. S2CID 287978.
- Giacomin, Giambattista; Deuschel, Jean-Dominique; Bolthausen, Erwin (2001). "Entropic Repulstion and the Maximum of the two-dimensional harmonic". The Annals of Probability. 29 (4): 1670–1692. doi:10.1214/aop/1015345767. ISSN 0091-1798.
- Bolthausen, Erwin; Sznitman, Alain-Sol (2002). "On the Satic and Dynamic Points of View for Certain Random Walks in Random Environment". Methods Appl. Anal. 9 (3): 345–376. doi:10.4310/MAA.2002.v9.n3.a4.
- Bolthausen, Erwin; Sznitman, Alain-Sol; Zeitouni, Ofer (2003). "Cut points and diffusive random walks in random environment" (PDF). Annales de l'Institut Henri Poincaré B. 39 (3): 527–555. doi:10.1016/S0246-0203(02)00019-5.
- Bolthausen, Erwin (March 2014). Ultrametricity in mean-field spin glasses [after Dmitry Panchenko] (PDF). 66ème année, 2013–2014, n^{o} 1082. Séminaire Bourbaki; 28 pages

=== Books ===
- as editor with Anton Bovier: Spin glasses. Lecture Notes in Mathematics. Vol. 1900. Springer Verlag. 2007. ISBN 9783540409083.
- with A. Sznitman: Ten lectures on random media. DMV Seminar Oberwolfach. Vol. 32. Birkhäuser. 2002. Bolthausen, Erwin; Sznitman, Alain-Sol (6 December 2012). 2012 pbk reprint. ISBN 9783034881593.
