= Pólya Prize =

Pólya Prize may refer to:

- George Pólya Prize, awarded by the Society for Industrial and Applied Mathematics (SIAM)
- Pólya Prize (LMS), awarded by the London Mathematical Society

== See also ==
- George Pólya Award, awarded by the Mathematical Association of America
