= Statistical Research Group =

The Statistical Research Group (SRG) was a research group at Columbia University focused on military problems during World War II. Abraham Wald, Allen Wallis, Herbert Solomon, Frederick Mosteller, George Stigler, Leonard Jimmie Savage and Milton Friedman were all part of the group in which 18 researchers participated.

Wallis, Stigler and Friedman met as graduate students at the University of Chicago. Despite their shared alma mater there is no evidence that Stigler and Friedman had grown close before serving on the SRG staff together in New York City.

The SRG was disbanded at the end of World War II, but several of its members remained affiliated to Columbia University, and would eventually establish the Department of Statistics at Columbia University.

== Background ==
Statistical analysis was widely used by Federal agencies after the New Deal. The statistical publications of the United States became more sophisticated between 1930 and 1940. During the mobilization to war (1940–1941) and continuing on during the war, statistics continued to gain in importance with applications in operations research and management information systems (MIS). The Statistical Control System in the Air Force developed under Colonel C.B. Thornton, was an example of a wartime MIS. Its mission was to provide "a continuous flow of detailed information on the status of many parts of the Air Force, including personnel, supply, operations, and basic data upon which to base attrition rates, sortie rates, crew rotation rates, maintenance needs, supply rates, etc."

== Organization ==
The Statistical Research Group (SRG) at Columbia University was supported by the Applied Mathematics Panel (AMP) or the National Defense Research Committee (NDRC), part of the Office of Scientific Research and Development (OSRD).

== History ==
While teaching at Stanford during the war years, Allen Wallis wrote to a friend at the Census Bureau:

Those of us teaching statistics in various departments here are trying to work out a curriculum adapted to the immediate statistical requirements of the war. It seems probably that a good many students with research training might by training in statistics become more useful for war than in their present work, or might increase their usefulness within their present fields."

Friedman wrote an appendix called "A Cautionary Tale about Multiple Regressions" that was published in Alternative Approaches to Analyzing Economic Data in which he says that, as a researcher at SRG, he constructed two new alloys to be used in aircraft engines. His work was based on a regression model that made use of data on existing alloys. Using this model he predicted that it would take several hundred hours for the new alloys to rupture at high temperatures.
