= Jon A. Wellner =

American statistician (born 1945)

Jon August Wellner
- Born: August 17, 1945 (age 80); Portland, Oregon, USA
- Education: University of Idaho (BS); University of Washington (PhD)
- Scientific career
- Fields: Statistics
- Institutions: University of Rochester; University of Washington
- Doctoral advisor: Galen Shorack
- Doctoral students: Moulinath Banerjee; Florentina Bunea; Nilanjan Chatterjee; Marloes Maathuis

Jon August Wellner (born August 17, 1945) is an American statistician known for his contributions to the fields of statistical inference, empirical process theory, and survival analysis.

== Education and career ==
Wellner was born in Portland, Oregon, and grew up in various cities in the US. His father was United States Forest Service scientist Charles Wellner. He attended Ogden High School in Ogden, Utah and graduated in 1963. He went on to attend the University of Idaho in Moscow, Idaho, where he earned a Bachelor of Science degree in Mathematics and Physics in 1968. After a brief stint in graduate school at Yale University in 1969–1970 and serving in the U.S. Army Signal Corps from 1969 to 1971, he returned to graduate study in statistics at the University of Washington and received his Ph.D. in 1975 with Galen Shorack as his advisor.

Wellner worked as an assistant professor and associate professor of statistics at the University of Rochester from 1975 to 1983, after which he moved back to the University of Washington in Seattle, Washington and became a professor of statistics. He remained at the University of Washington for the rest of his career, retiring in 2020.

== Honors and awards ==
Wellner was elected a Fellow of the Institute of Mathematical Statistics (IMS) in 1983, a Fellow of the American Association for the Advancement of Science in 1994, and a Fellow of the American Statistical Association (ASA) in 2006; he became an elected member of the International Statistical Institute in 2010. He was the Noether Distinguished Scholar of the ASA in 2011. He gave the Le Cam lecture of the IMS in 2015. He served as the executive editor of Statistical Science. Wellner was the president of the Institute of Mathematical Statistics between 2016 and 2017. In 2010, he was made a Knight of the Order of the Netherlands Lion. A conference in honor of Wellner's 65th birthday was held in July of 2010.

== Bibliography ==
- Groeneboom, Piet; Wellner, Jon A. (1992). Information Bounds and Nonparametric Maximum Likelihood Estimation. Basel: Springer. ISBN 978-3-7643-2794-1. OCLC 26308177.
- Bickel, Peter J.; Klaassen, Chris A.J.; Ritov, Ya'acov; Wellner, Jon A. (1993). Efficient and adaptive estimation for semiparametric models. Baltimore: Johns Hopkins University Press. ISBN 0-8018-4541-6. OCLC 26767877.
- Shorack, Galen R.; Wellner, Jon A. (2009). Empirical processes with applications to statistics. Philadelphia, Pa.: Society for Industrial and Applied Mathematics. ISBN 978-0-89871-901-7. OCLC 693777479.
  Reprint of Shorack, Galen R.; Wellner, Jon A. (1986). Empirical processes with applications to statistics. New York: Wiley. ISBN 978-0-47186-725-8.
- Vaart, A. W. van der; Wellner, Jon A. (2023). Weak convergence and empirical processes: with applications to statistics (2nd ed.). Springer. ISBN 3031290380. OCLC 1390554734.
  1st ed. (1996), same authors and publishers, ISBN 0-387-94640-3, OCLC 33664331
