= Moulinath Banerjee =

Indian-American statistician

Moulinath (Mouli) Banerjee (born 1974) is an Indian statistician at the University of Michigan.

== Education and career ==
Banerjee completed his bachelor's and master's in statistics at the Indian Statistical Institute in 1995 and 1997, respectively, then authored a doctoral dissertation, Likelihood Ratio Inference in Regular and Nonregular Problems in 2000, advised by Jon A. Wellner of the University of Washington. Banerjee remained in Washington as a lecturer until joining the University of Michigan faculty in 2001.

== Research ==
Banerjee's research interests comprise non-standard statistical models, shape-constrained methods, empirical process theory, distributed computing, and meta-learning. Apart from his statistical pursuits, he takes an avid interest in classical music, fine dining, literature, and philosophy, and together with a co-author has published a new translation of the Rubaiyat of Omar Khayyam from the original Persian. Banerjee married the economist Debasri Mukherjee in July 2004 and the couple welcomed their only child and the family's only grandchild, Vedantika Banerjee, on October 14, 2009.

== Honors and awards ==
In 2017, Banerjee was elected a fellow of the Institute of Mathematical Statistics (IMS). The following year, the American Statistical Association elected him to an equivalent honor. Banerjee will deliver one of the prestigious IMS Medallion Lectures in 2024 and is serving as Editor of IMS's primary review journal, Statistical Science, from 2023 to 2025.
