= John Lehoczky =

American statistician

John Paul Lehoczky (born June 29, 1943) is an American statistician and the Thomas Lord Professor Emeritus at Carnegie Mellon University. He received his PhD in 1969 at Stanford under Herbert Solomon.

Lehoczky's research on scheduling and stochastic modeling contributed to the development of predictable real-time computer systems. Methodology developed by Lehoczky and his Carnegie Mellon collaborators was adopted in systems including NASA's Space Station, the Mars Rover, the GPS satellite system and the F-35, and was incorporated into several IEEE computer standards. In 2016, Lehoczky, Ragunathan Rajkumar and Lui Sha received the IEEE Simon Ramo Medal for their contributions to the theory, practice and standardization of engineering real-time systems.
