= Chernoff's distribution =

Probability distribution of random variable

In probability theory, Chernoff's distribution, named after Herman Chernoff, is the probability distribution of the random variable

$$Z =\underset{s \in \mathbf{R}}{\operatorname{argmax}}\ (W(s) - s^2),$$

where W is a "two-sided" Wiener process (or two-sided "Brownian motion") satisfying W(0) = 0. If

$$V(a,c) = \underset{s \in \mathbf{R}}{\operatorname{argmax}} \ (W(s) - c(s-a)^2),$$

then V(0, c) has density

$$f_c(t) = \frac{1}{2} g_c(t) g_c(-t)$$

where g_{c} has Fourier transform given by

$$\hat{g}_c (s) = \frac{(2/c)^{1/3}}{\operatorname{Ai} (i (2c^2)^{-1/3} s)}, \ \ \ s \in \mathbf{R}$$

and where Ai is the Airy function. Thus f_{c} is symmetric about 0 and the density ƒ_{Z} = ƒ_{1}. Groeneboom (1989) shows that

$$f_Z (z) \sim \frac{1}{2} \frac{4^{4/3} |z|}{\operatorname{Ai}' (\tilde{a}_1)} \exp \left( - \frac{2}{3} |z|^3 + 2^{1/3} \tilde{a}_1 |z| \right)
\text{ as }z \rightarrow \infty$$

where $\tilde{a}_1 \approx -2.3381$ is the largest zero of the Airy function Ai and where $\operatorname{Ai}' (\tilde{a}_1 ) \approx 0.7022$. In the same paper, Groeneboom also gives an analysis of the process $\{V(a,1): a \in \mathbf{R}\}$. The connection with the statistical problem of estimating a monotone density is discussed in Groeneboom (1985). Chernoff's distribution is now known to appear in a wide range of monotone problems including isotonic regression.

The Chernoff distribution should not be confused with the Chernoff geometric distribution (called the Chernoff point in information geometry) induced by the Chernoff information.

== History ==
Groeneboom, Lalley and Temme state that the first investigation of this distribution was probably by Chernoff in 1964, who studied the behavior of a certain estimator of a mode. In his paper, Chernoff characterized the distribution through an analytic representation through the heat equation with suitable boundary conditions. Initial attempts at approximating Chernoff's distribution via solving the heat equation, however, did not achieve satisfactory precision due to the nature of the boundary conditions. The computation of the distribution is addressed, for example, in Groeneboom and Wellner (2001).

The connection of Chernoff's distribution with Airy functions was also found independently by Daniels and Skyrme and Temme, as cited in Groeneboom, Lalley and Temme. These two papers, along with Groeneboom (1989), were all written in 1984.
