= Herbert Solomon =

American statistician

- Born: March 13, 1919; Harlem, New York
- Died: September 20, 2004 (aged 85)
- Education: City College of New York (BA); Columbia University (MA); Stanford University (PhD)
- Scientific career
- Fields: Statistics
- Workplaces: Columbia University; Stanford University
- Thesis: Distribution of the Measure of a Two-Dimensional Random Set (1950)
- Doctoral advisor: Herman Rubin
- Doctoral students: John Lehoczky; Alan E. Gelfand

Herbert Solomon (March 13, 1919 – September 20, 2004) was an American statistician. He was a professor emeritus of statistics at Stanford University and co-founder of the university's statistics department. Born in Harlem to Jewish-Russian immigrant parents, he attended DeWitt Clinton High School and later earned a bachelor's degree from the City College of New York in 1940 and a master's degree from Columbia University in 1941. His studies were interrupted by World War II, during which he was a member of the Statistical Research Group at Columbia. After the war, he would continue his doctoral studies at Stanford, and earned his doctorate in 1950. After serving in the Office of Naval Research from 1948 to 1952, he returned to Columbia as a professor, and taught there from 1952 to 1959. While on sabbatical, he returned to Stanford, where he would teach for the remainder of his life.

In 1954 he was named a Fellow of the American Statistical Association.
