= Abraham Wald =

Hungarian-American mathematician (1902–1950)

- A young Wald
- Born: October 31, 1902; Kolozsvár, Kingdom of Hungary, Austria-Hungary
- Died: December 13, 1950 (aged 48); Nilgiri Mountains, India
- Education: King Ferdinand I University; University of Vienna
- Known for: Wald's equation Wald test Wald distribution Wald–Wolfowitz runs test Wald's martingale Wald's maximin model Mann–Wald theorem Decision theory Sequential analysis Sequential probability ratio test
- Children: Robert Wald
- Scientific career
- Fields: Mathematics; Statistics; Economics
- Workplaces: Columbia University; Cowles Commission for Research in Economics
- Doctoral advisor: Karl Menger
- Doctoral students: Herman Chernoff; Meyer Abraham Girshick; Milton Sobel; Charles Stein

Abraham Wald (/wɔːld/; German: [valt]; Hungarian: Wald Ábrahám, Yiddish: אברהם וואַלד; 31 October 1902 – 13 December 1950) was a Hungarian-American mathematician and statistician who contributed to decision theory, geometry and econometrics, and founded the field of sequential analysis. One of his well-known statistical works was written during World War II on how to minimize the damage to bomber aircraft and took into account the survivorship bias in his calculations. He spent his research career at Columbia University. He was the grandson of Rabbi Moshe Shmuel Glasner.

== Life and career ==
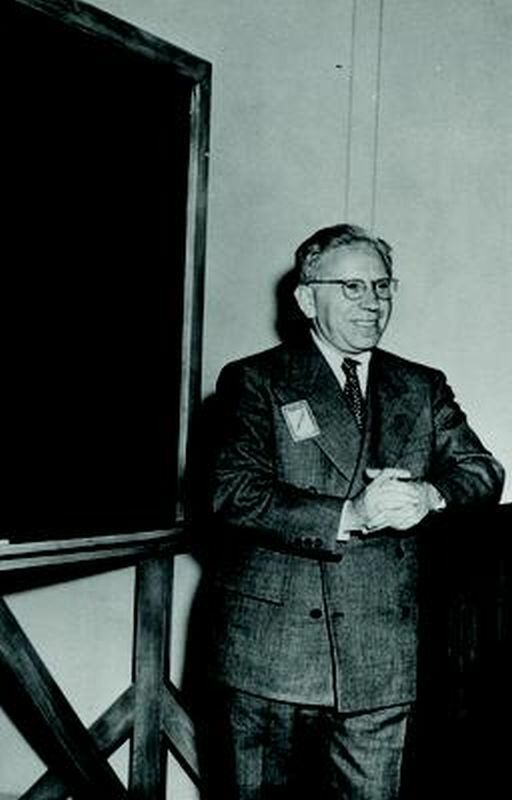
Photograph of Abraham Wald from the Oberwolfach Research Institute for Mathematics

Wald was born on 31 October 1902 in Kolozsvár, Transylvania, in the Kingdom of Hungary. A religious Jew, he did not attend school on Saturdays, as was then required by the Hungarian school system, and so he was homeschooled by his parents until college. His parents were quite knowledgeable and competent as teachers.

In 1928, he graduated in mathematics from the King Ferdinand I University. In 1927, he had entered graduate school at the University of Vienna, from which he graduated in 1931 with a Ph.D. in mathematics. His advisor there was Karl Menger.

Despite Wald's brilliance, he could not obtain a university position because of Austrian discrimination against Jews. However, Oskar Morgenstern created a position for Wald in economics. When Nazi Germany annexed Austria in 1938, the discrimination against Jews intensified. In particular, Wald and his family were persecuted as Jews. Wald emigrated to the United States at the invitation of the Cowles Commission for Research in Economics, to work on econometrics research. By September 1938 Wald was a Fellow of the Carnegie Corporation at Columbia University learning about modern English language statistics from Harold Hotelling. He was appointed to the Columbia Faculty in 1941 and remained there until his death.

The damaged portions of returning planes show locations where they can sustain damage and still return home; those hit in other places presumedly do not survive. (Image shows hypothetical data.)

During World War II, Wald was a member of the Statistical Research Group (SRG) at Columbia University, where he applied his statistical skills to various wartime problems. There was a difficulty: the work was secret and Wald was officially an enemy alien and, as such, barred from access to restricted matter. Hotelling recounts, “This impasse led to a facetious suggestion that each page he wrote should immediately be snatched away and never shown to him again, but was resolved when a federal court granted him a hearing long before his turn on the docket and promptly naturalized him.”

The problems that the SRG worked on included methods of sequential analysis and sampling inspection. Another was to examine the distribution of damage to aircraft returning after flying missions to provide advice on how to minimize bomber losses to enemy fire. Wald derived a useful means of estimating the damage distribution for all aircraft that flew from the data on the damage distribution of all aircraft that returned. His work is considered seminal in the discipline of operational research, which was then fledgling.

Wald and his wife died in 1950 when the Air India plane (VT-CFK, a DC-3 aircraft) in which they were travelling crashed near the Rangaswamy Pillar in the northern part of the Nilgiri Mountains, in southern India, on an extensive lecture tour at the invitation of the Indian government. He had visited the Indian Statistical Institute at Calcutta and was to attend the Indian Science Congress at Bangalore in January. Their two children were back at home in the United States.

After his death, Wald was criticized by Sir Ronald A. Fisher FRS. Fisher attacked Wald for being a mathematician without scientific experience who had written an incompetent book on statistics. Fisher particularly criticized Wald's work on the design of experiments and alleged ignorance of the basic ideas of the subject, as set out by Fisher and Frank Yates. Wald's work was defended by Jerzy Neyman the next year. Neyman explained Wald's work, particularly with respect to the design of experiments. Lucien Le Cam credits him in his own book, Asymptotic Methods in Statistical Decision Theory: "The ideas and techniques used reflect first and foremost the influence of Abraham Wald's writings."

He is the father of the noted American physicist Robert Wald.

== Notable publications ==
For a complete list, see "The Publications of Abraham Wald", Annals of Mathematical Statistics, 23 (1): 29–33, 1952, doi:10.1214/aoms/1177729483

- — (1939), "A New Formula for the Index of Cost of Living", Econometrica, 7 (4), Econometrica, Vol. 7, No. 4: 319–331, doi:10.2307/1906982, JSTOR 1906982
- — (1939), "Contributions to the Theory of Statistical Estimation and Testing Hypotheses", Annals of Mathematical Statistics, 10 (4): 299–326, Bibcode:1939AnnMS..10..299W, doi:10.1214/aoms/1177732144
- — (1940), "The Fitting of Straight Lines if Both Variables Are Subject to Error", Annals of Mathematical Statistics, 11 (3): 284–300, Bibcode:1940AnnMS..11..284W, doi:10.1214/aoms/1177731868
- — (June 1945), "Sequential Tests of Statistical Hypotheses", The Annals of Mathematical Statistics, 16 (2): 117–186, doi:10.1214/aoms/1177731118
- — (1947). Sequential Analysis. New York: John Wiley and Sons. Reprinted, Dover publications, 1973, ISBN 0-486-43912-7.
- — (1950). Statistical Decision Functions. John Wiley and Sons, New York; Chapman and Hall, London. p. ix+179.
