= Meyer Abraham Girshick =

Russian-American statistician (1908–1955)

- Born: July 25, 1908; Russian Empire
- Died: March 2, 1955 (aged 46); Palo Alto, California, U.S.

Academic background
- Education: Columbia University
- Doctoral advisor: Abraham Wald
- Other advisor: Harold Hotelling

Academic work
- Discipline: Statistics
- Sub-discipline: Sequential analysis Decision theory
- Institutions: Stanford University
- Doctoral students: Lincoln Moses

Meyer Abraham Girshick (born in the Russian Empire, July 25, 1908; died in Palo Alto, California, USA, March 2, 1955) was a Russian-American statistician.

Girshick emigrated to the United States from Russia in 1922. He received his undergraduate degree from Columbia University in 1932 and studied in the graduate school at Columbia under Harold Hotelling from 1934 to 1937. From 1937 to 1946 he worked at various bureaus in the United States Department of Agriculture; he worked in the Statistical Research Group at Columbia University briefly during World War II and also worked briefly in the United States Census Bureau. Girshick joined the RAND Corporation in the summer of 1947. He became a professor of statistics at Stanford University in 1948, where he remained until his death.

Girshick is known for his contributions to sequential analysis and decision theory. He was president of the Institute of Mathematical Statistics in 1952. Girshick had previously been elected a fellow of the IMS in 1943 and a fellow of the American Statistical Association in 1946.

== Selected works ==
- Contributions to the Theory of Sequential Analysis. I, M. A. Girshick, The Annals of Mathematical Statistics 17, #2 (June 1946), pp. 123–143, doi:10.1214/aoms/1177730976, JSTOR 2236034.
- Contributions to the Theory of Sequential Analysis, II, III, M. A. Girshick, The Annals of Mathematical Statistics 17, #3 (September 1946), pp. 282–298, doi:10.1214/aoms/1177730941, JSTOR 2236126.
- Theory of Games and Statistical Decisions, David Blackwell and M. A. Girshick, New York, London, Sydney: John Wiley & Sons, Inc., 1954.
