= Conference Board of the Mathematical Sciences =

The Conference Board of the Mathematical Sciences (CBMS) is an umbrella organization of seventeen professional societies in the mathematical sciences in the United States. It and its member societies are recognized by the International Mathematical Union as the national mathematical societies for their country.

The CBMS was founded in 1960 as the successor organization to the six-organization Policy Committee for Mathematics (founded by the American Mathematical Society and the Mathematical Association of America as the War Policy Committee in 1942) and the 1958 Conference Organization of the Mathematical Sciences. As well as representing US mathematics at the IMU, it acts as a communication channel between its member societies and the US Government, and coordinates joint projects of its member societies.

== Member societies ==
- AMATYC American Mathematical Association of Two-Year Colleges
- AMS American Mathematical Society
- AMTE Association of Mathematics Teacher Educators
- ASA American Statistical Association
- ASL Association for Symbolic Logic
- AWM Association for Women in Mathematics
- ASSM Association of State Supervisors of Mathematics
- BBA Benjamin Banneker Association
- INFORMS Institute for Operations Research and the Management Sciences
- IMS Institute of Mathematical Statistics
- MAA Mathematical Association of America
- NAM National Association of Mathematicians
- NCSM National Council of Supervisors of Mathematics
- NCTM National Council of Teachers of Mathematics
- SIAM Society for Industrial and Applied Mathematics
- SOA Society of Actuaries
- TODOS TODOS: Mathematics for All
- WME Women and Mathematics Education
