= False or misleading statements by Donald Trump (second term) =

Though touting "landslide" victories, Trump won the 2016 and 2024 elections with respectively 56.9% and 58% of the Electoral College—placing the wins in approximately the 23rd and 28th percentiles of all presidential elections.

Though Trump repeatedly promoted his 2024 victory as a mandate—to inflate the actual degree of voter support—he failed to receive 50% of the popular vote. His 1.5 percentage point margin of victory in 2024 (shown in chart) places it in only the 20th percentile of presidential elections since 1828.

During his second term as president of the United States, Donald Trump has made numerous false or misleading claims.

== Events ==
Major events during Trump's second presidency that were fact-checked for multiple falsehoods.

=== First week of Second Term ===
On January 20, 2025, Trump made his inaugural address at the Capitol's rotunda, unscripted second and third speeches at the Capitol Visitor Center's Emancipation Hall and Washington's Capital One Arena, concluding the day with statements to reporters at the Oval Office. News media and fact-checkers declared Trump made multiple false and misleading statements, mostly repetitions of falsehoods from his campaign.

The Associated Press fact-checked several of Trump's statements from his first week in office, declaring them false and misleading.

=== Speech to a joint session of Congress ===
On March 4, 2025, Trump addressed a joint session of the United States Congress. News media and fact-checkers declared Trump made multiple false and misleading statements.

=== News conference about crime in Washington, D.C. ===
Though Trump said in September 2025 that "the radicals on the left are the problem" with political violence, cumulatively over decades, most extremist killings in the US have been caused by right-wing perpetrators. From 2022 through 2024, all 61 political killings were committed by right-wing extremists.

Even before Charlie Kirk's shooter's motive was known, US President Trump immediately blamed Kirk's killing on rhetoric from the "radical left". However, various studies have shown that right-wing violence has exceeded that of left-wing violence and Islamist-inspired violence.

Through early October 2026, Trump had attacked the integrity of US elections on more than 70% of the days following his 2025 inauguration, repeatedly making false claims.

On August 11, Trump held a press conference to declare a "public safety emergency", announcing the deployment of the National Guard and other law enforcement agencies to crack down on crime and homelessness in Washington, D.C., following the deployment of hundreds of federal law enforcement officers over the weekend.

News media and fact-checkers declared that Trump made multiple false and misleading statements, noting that the rates of homicides and other violent crimes he declared were false, and there are legal issues regarding his use of the Metropolitan Police Department of the District of Columbia and the National Guard.

The New York Times noted that a chart Trump held up comparing Washington’s homicide rate to that of eight other "capitals" (Lagos, Nigeria, is not a capital), first appearing on Fox News and shared by JD Vance, cites outdated data and omits other capitals with much higher murder rates. It also pointed out that Jeanine Pirro's statements about her inability to prosecute minors were misleading and inaccurate.

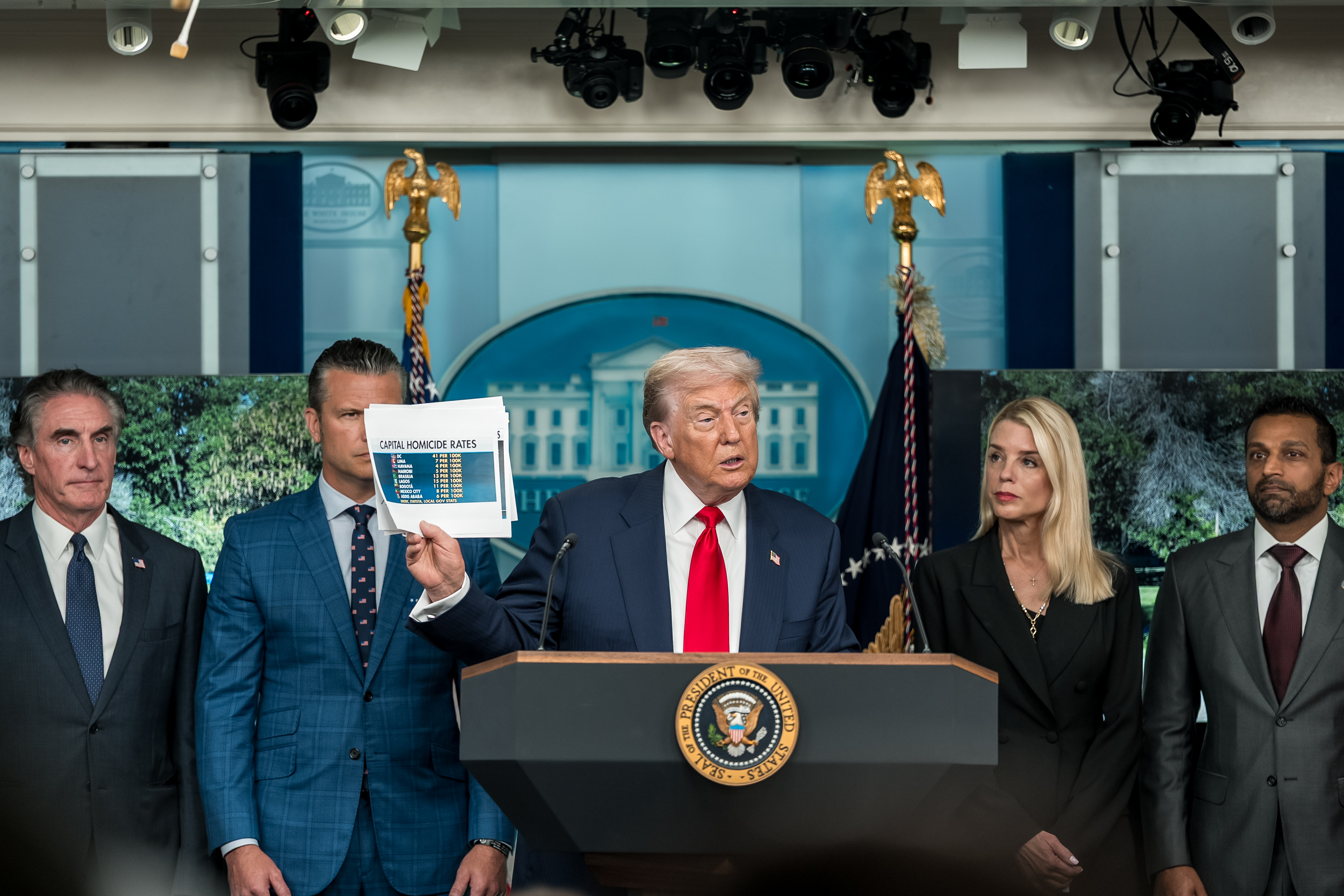
President Trump and FBI Director Kash Patel (far right) in a press conference on crime in Washington, D.C. in August 2025

In the press conference, Trump talked about "a man" who quit "because he was asked to do phony numbers on crime (...) But he was asked by the city, I guess, that we don't want to show the real numbers." In an August 13 post on Truth Social, Trump wrote that "a Precinct Commander was just suspended for allegedly manipulating the Violent Crime Statistics, and the D.C. Police Union, likewise, says the real numbers are much higher."

In July 2025, NBC 4 reported that after an exchange of accusations between Michael Pulliam, the former commander of the 3rd District, an assistant chief, the police union, and the department, the commander, who denies any wrongdoing, was placed on paid administrative leave in mid-May. In the related interview, DC Police Union Chairman Gregg Pemberton stated that high-ranking officers attend felony offense scenes and direct police officers "to take a report for a lesser offense", that it is "a directive from the command staff", and he called the official crime descent numbers "preposterous." As of the publication date, the investigation into the allegations was ongoing.

In an August interview with NBC 4, Chairman Pemberton reiterated his assertions regarding crime numbers' descent, based on the police's day-to-day experience. NBC 4 contextualized his statements, pointing out the notable 2023 crime spike, and that crime and homicides have descended in multiple cities to rates even lower than D.C.'s. Regarding the White House's claim that "Metro Police Department leadership are allegedly cooking the books to make crime statistics appear more favorable", NBC 4 noted that data reporting anomalies were found in just one police district.

=== September 2025 press conference on autism ===
On September 22, 2025, Trump gave a press conference on the "autism crisis" and findings of the investigation led by Secretary of Health and Human Services Robert F. Kennedy Jr., in which he claimed that they had found Tylenol (paracetamol, most commonly called acetaminophen in the United States, Canada, and Japan) taken during pregnancy was the cause of autism, and strongly recommended the public not to take Tylenol nor give it to infants. Scientific American has reported that fever itself in the second [2nd] trimester is a risk factor for autism, and therefore the claims made by the Trump administration are counter-productive. This press conference also announced that the FDA is approving prescription leucovorin (folinic acid) for the treatment of children on the autism spectrum.

Trump also made various claims about vaccines, like that the Amish do not vaccinate nor take "pills", and they have "essentially no autism;" also, he expressed opposition to the vaccination schedule, claiming among other things that "it looks like they are pumping into a horse. You have a little child, little fragile child, and you get a vat of 80 different vaccines, I guess, 80 different blends, and they pump it in." Trump reiterated these claims in a September 26 Truth Social post. These claims were determined as false by fact-checkers, and the media (which drew parallels with Trump's response to the COVID-19 pandemic), plus entities such as the American Academy of Pediatrics, the American College of Obstetricians and Gynecologists, the American Psychiatric Association, the Center for Infectious Disease Research and Policy, the World Health Organization, the Consumer Healthcare Products Association, the Autism Science Foundation, and the Autistic Self Advocacy Network.

Kenvue, the maker of Tylenol, strongly disagreed with Trump's claims as shares of the company fell 7.5% in trading on September 22, reducing the company’s market value by about $2.6 billion.

Regarding leucovorin, Céline Gounder, CBS News medical contributor and editor-at-large for public health at KFF Health News, said that it can help treat some autism cases, but it is not a universal remedy: "You can have a perfectly normal folate level in your blood, but it may not be getting into the brain, and so there's a defect in the transport of folate into the brain. Leucovorin works around that", Gounder said. "Not all children with autism have this defect, so there's a test you can do to assess whether that's what's at play. For those kids, leucovorin has been shown to help, particularly with speech, getting kids to be more verbal than they were before."

Trump’s comments on Tylenol seemed to be based on several studies, including a 2025 American study that summarized 46 studies that identified a slightly increased risk of autism associated with prenatal paracetamol use, but did not demonstrate causation. During the press conference, the study was cited by Marty Makary, along with two others, as justification for officially advising pregnant women against taking Tylenol. The study itself came under strong scrutiny in the scientific community, with members of the scientific community pointing to its inconsistent methodology, deviation from the cited systematic review and evidence grading protocols, and multiple choices that swayed the interpretation of results, with one professor stating “I’ve never seen any kind of review of any kind or any kind of meta analysis, at any time, in which somebody said, I don’t like the adjusted results, so I’m going to include the unadjusted results". Large, well-controlled studies, including sibling-controlled analyses, find no causal link after adjusting for maternal conditions, while untreated pain and fever is known to harm both mother and fetus.

Ann Bauer, who co-authored the 2025 American study, declared herself concerned about the effects Trump's use of it could have: "Bauer worries such statements will cut both ways: People may put themselves at risk to avoid vaccines and Tylenol, the only safe painkiller for use during pregnancy. And she frets that scientists might outright reject her team's measured concerns about Tylenol in a backlash against misleading remarks from Trump and other members of his "Make America Healthy Again" movement." In 2023, Andrea Baccarelli, also a co-author of the analysis and current dean of the Harvard T.H. Chan School of Public Health, was paid at least $150,000 to provide testimony (together with other experts) for a group of parents and guardians of children diagnosed with autism and ADHD, in a class action lawsuit against Tylenol’s manufacturer, Johnson & Johnson/Kenvue (in that year Kenvue spun off from Johnson & Johnson). The plaintiffs paid Baccarelli $700 an hour for his expert testimony, according to a 2023 deposition. Denise Cote, the federal judge overseeing the case in the Southern District of New York, dismissed the lawsuit, describing the experts' testimonies as "unreliable" and not in adherence with the Daubert standard. Regarding Baccarelli's, Cote summarized that he "cherry-picked and misrepresented study results and refused to acknowledge the role of genetics in the etiology" of autism and ADHD. "The discussion in his reports is incomplete, unbalanced, and at times misleading. In general, Baccarelli downplays those studies that undercut his causation thesis and emphasises those that align with his thesis." In a statement, Baccarelli confirmed he consulted with the Trump administration ahead of its autism announcement, and that "further research is needed to confirm the association and determine causality." This stands in contrast to his expert report provided in the Johnson & Johnson lawsuit, Baccarelli wrote, "Substantial evidence supports a strong, positive, causal association between acetaminophen and Neurodevelopmental Disorders (NDDs)." Baccarelli's work demonstrated only a correlation and not a causal link, as the Trump administration has asserted.

On October 9, 2025, Trump and U.S. Secretary of Health and Human Services Robert Kennedy Jr. alleged a link between autism and circumcisions. Kennedy cited a 2015 Danish study to justify this claim. The validity of Kennedy's assertion about circumcisions being linked to autism has also been challenged by scientists and medical experts. Kennedy Jr appeared to walk back his comments in an October 29, when he spoke with reporters and stated that the causative association between Tylenol use in pregnancy and autism was not definitely proven but instead showed it was very suggestive.

==== Resulting lawsuits ====
On October 28, 2025 it was announced that Texas Attorney General Ken Paxton had sued the makers of Tylenol, Johnson & Johnson and Kenvue, alleging that they had deceptively marketed the drug to pregnant women despite the drug's supposed links to autism and other disorders. In a statement Kenvue stated that they were deeply concerned about the "perpetuation of misinformation" being pushed by Paxton.

=== September 2025 speech at the United Nations ===
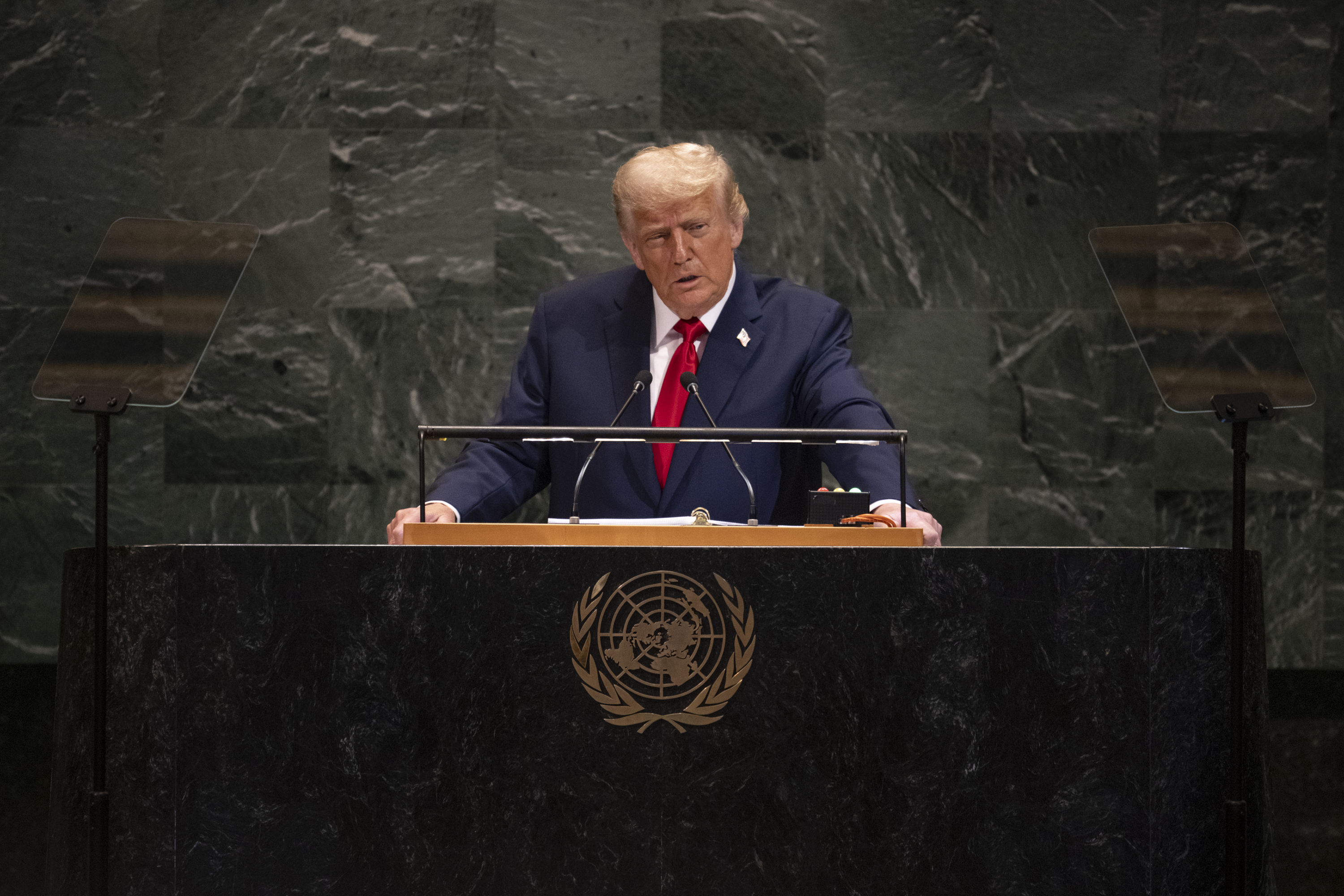
President Trump during his speech in the general debate of the 80th session of the UN General Assembly

Right About Everything

I'm really good at predicting things. They... had a hat, the best-selling hat, "Trump was right about everything". And I don't say that in a braggadocious way, but it's true. I've been right about everything.

— President Donald Trump
to the UN General Assembly,
September 23, 2025

On September 23, 2025, Trump delivered a speech to the United Nations General Assembly. He spoke for nearly 57 minutes (despite having been asked to confine his remarks to 15 minutes, like all other speakers), addressing a variety of subjects such as inflation in the US, his standing in national opinion polls, immigration and climate policies both in the US and abroad, and his personal role in settling international conflicts.

Many of his claims were determined as false by fact-checkers and the media. Trump's claims about climate change were specifically addressed, and some of his political claims elicited backlash and concern abroad.

Trump's "your countries are going to Hell" speech was also described as "colorful", "combative", "meandering", and "inflammatory", analyzed as a sign of changing times, and as a sign of the "waning of US influence." As "Trump has moved to slash US funding of the UN, withdrawn from many of its agencies, and ordered a review of America's interactions with the organisation", this has weakened its capacity to protect human rights, and "creating an opportunity for other nations to step in and attempt to fill the vacuum", with authoritarian nations such as China, Qatar, and Russia already taking initiatives in that regard, and countries like Chile and the Netherlands having their own human rights and cooperation talks.

=== Demolition of the East Wing for the White House State Ballroom ===
On July 31, 2025, Trump said the new White House State Ballroom being constructed "won't interfere with the current building', wouldn't be "touching it", and would pay "total respect to the existing building, which I’m the biggest fan of." The entire East Wing was demolished in October 2025, unannounced and without review by the National Capital Planning Commission, which oversees federal construction. On May 11, 2026, at a press conference, Trump said the White House had been "a shit house" in disrepair but, with his improvements, was "tippy top now."

=== December 2025 Address to the Nation ===
On December 17, Trump addressed the nation from the White House, in an 18-minute-long prime time address that was broadcast live by major television networks. News media and fact-checkers declared that Trump made multiple false and misleading statements, especially about the economy.

=== January 2026 First Anniversary press conference ===
On January 20, the first anniversary of his second-term inauguration, Trump took over a White House press briefing that was originally scheduled to be conducted by Karoline Leavitt. In it, he touted the accomplishments of his administration and answered questions. News media and fact-checkers declared that Trump made multiple false and misleading statements, mostly about economic figures, foreign and domestic affairs, and the 2020 elections. Relatedly, political commentators opined that many of his inauguration pledges had gone unfulfilled.

=== January 2026 Speech at Davos ===
On January 21, Trump addressed the World Economic Forum (WEF) annual meeting in Davos, after which he dialogued with Børge Brende, its president and CEO. News media and fact-checkers declared that Trump made multiple false and misleading statements, mostly about Greenland and NATO. It was also noted that Trump repeatedly referred to Greenland as "Iceland."

=== February 2026 State of the Union Address ===
On February 24, 2026, Trump delivered the 2026 State of the Union Address to a joint session of the United States Congress. Before the event, media outlets and fact-checkers described Trump's expected falsehoods, mostly about the economy.

During and after the event, news media and fact-checkers declared that Trump made multiple false and misleading statements.

=== April 2026 Address about Iran ===
On April 1, Trump addressed the nation from the White House, in a 19-minute-long prime time address that was his first one about the 2026 Iran War.

News media and fact-checkers declared that Trump made multiple false and misleading statements about the war and other subjects, mostly about the economy. The address was also criticized on its omissions.

=== July 2026 Address about election security ===
On July 16, Trump addressed the nation from the White House, in a 26-minute-long prime time address about election security in the United States.

In it, he claimed that the 2020 presidential elections were rigged, and that the US electoral system is vulnerable to ongoing international attempts at meddling with the upcoming elections. He also announced the release of previously classified documents related to the 2020 and 2018 elections, and urged the Department of Justice to conduct investigations and prosecutions.

News media and fact-checkers declared that Trump made multiple false and misleading statements about the security of the elections in the United States.

=== July 24, 2026 White House Correspondents' Dinner ===
On July 24, 2026, at the 2026 White House Correspondents Dinner, Trump announced that he intended to seek a "4th term", and put on a hat that read "Trump 2028". Trump then went on to claim that he performed very well while running for a second term in 2020 but lost due to alleged fraud in the 2020 United States presidential election.

== False and misleading statements by topic ==
First, the broader topics that allow for subdivisions are alphabetically listed.
Second, the other topics are ordered chronologically, according to the date on which the subject was first made known in this term.

=== Claims about other countries and international organizations ===
==== Blame for start of Russo-Ukrainian War ====
Trump has falsely stated that Ukraine is to blame for the Russian invasion of Ukraine that started the Russo-Ukrainian War:

In Mr. Trump's telling, Ukrainian leaders were at fault for the war for not agreeing to surrender territory and therefore, he suggested, they do not deserve a seat at the table for the peace talks that he has just initiated with Mr. Putin. 'You should have never started it,' Mr. Trump said, referring to Ukrainian leaders who, in fact, did not start it. 'You could have made a deal.'

Ukrainian President Volodymyr Zelenskyy rebutted that claim and accused Trump of spreading disinformation:

"I would like to have more truth with the Trump team," Mr. Zelensky told reporters in Kyiv during a broader discussion about the administration, which this week opened peace talks with Russia that excluded Ukraine. Mr. Zelensky said that the U.S. president was "living in a disinformation space" and in a "circle of disinformation."

Peter Baker of The New York Times described how Trump has never uttered "one word of reproach for Mr. Putin or for Russia". He also debunked other false claims by Trump:

As he often does, Mr. Trump flavored his comments with multiple false claims. Among them, he said that the United States has contributed three times as much aid to Ukraine since the war started as Europe has. In fact, according to the Kiel Institute for the World Economy, Europe has allocated $138 billion compared with $119 billion from the United States.

On November 23, 2025, Trump posted to Truth Social that "UKRAINE 'LEADERSHIP' HAS EXPRESSED ZERO GRATITUDE FOR OUR EFFORTS". The next day, CNN fact-checker Daniel Dale published 78 examples of Zelenskyy expressing thanks.

==== Claims about Iran ====
Media, fact-checkers, and officials have declared that Trump has made several false or unsupported claims about Iran, regarding the results of the 2025 strikes on nuclear sites, and to justify the "major combat operations" that started in February 2026, which he has repeated in events such as the April 1, 2026, address, which was described as "a litany of lies."

On the election night in 2024, Trump said "I'm not going to start wars". Starting the 2026 Iran war, "the most consequential war in the Middle East in two decades", is described as an "audacious break" of that promise.

- Trump repeatedly asserted that his June 2025 strikes had "obliterated" Iran's nuclear capabilities. Media, fact-checkers, internal White House documents from November 2025, and the International Atomic Energy Agency contradicted this, stating the program had been seriously damaged but not destroyed. Also, the apparent contradiction of needing to destroy already destroyed nuclear capabilities had been noted after his State of the Union address.

Trump states about Iran "In 2000, they knew and were probably involved with the attack on the USS Cole.", February 28, 2026

- Characterizing Iran as a historical terrorist threat during his February 28 announcement, Trump said, "they knew and were probably involved with the attack on the USS Cole" (2000). The FBI and the intelligence community have established that Al-Qaeda, not Iran, planned and carried out that attack, and that Iran's participation was its support of Al Qaeda.
- In his announcement of the 2026 war against Iran, Trump said the objective was "to defend the American people by eliminating eminent [sic] threats from the Iranian regime," claiming that Iran was developing intercontinental ballistic missiles that could "soon" reach the US mainland. Experts, and a 2025 Defense Intelligence Agency assessment, stated that Iran was years away from such capabilities, likely not achieving them until 2035. Iranian officials had rebuked Trump's claims since his State of the Union address.
- In a February 28 Truth Social post following the announcement, Trump repeated the claim that Iran interfered in the 2020 and 2024 US elections, linking to an article from Just The News. Critics view this as a potential legal pretext to claim emergency powers over the upcoming midterm elections rather than a legitimate military objective.
- When the Iranians retaliated against the Arab-led states of the Persian Gulf for the US attack on Iran, Trump said nobody had warned him and "Nobody expected that. We were shocked". It was later revealed that Trump had been briefed of this possible Iranian retaliation.
- During the 2026 Iran war, Trump claimed on several occasions that the US had "won" the war and that the Iranian military had been completely destroyed, despite claiming that the US had not yet completed its objectives while both sides continued attacks. On May 30, he told Fox News that "Their Navy is totally gone, 100%. Their Air Force is totally gone, 100%." He immediately added: "Their military, we’ve sort of left it alone — because we think that their military is somewhat moderate. ... We’ve actually left their military alone. People would be surprised to hear that. Because mistakes have been made in wars where you wipe out everybody and then you have a country that for 40 years can never rebuild."
- On March 9, 2026, Trump falsely claimed that the Strait of Hormuz had re-opened. Five days later, he demanded that US allies and China send warships to help the US re-open the strait.
- Trump repeatedly said that that US did not need the help of any allies in the 2026 Iran war. Nevertheless, on several occasions he demanded help from allies and criticized them for not joining in the war.
- On April 1, 2026, Trump claimed that Iran "have no anti-aircraft equipment" left and "Their radar is 100% annihilated". Two days later, Iran shot down a US fighter jet, and other US aircraft were shot down during the mission to rescue the pilots.
- Trump claimed the US had a "virtually unlimited supply" of weapons for the 2026 Iran war. Nevertheless, he reportedly pushed defence contractors to speed up production. According to analysts, the belligerents are using munitions faster than they can produce, and US magazine capacities were already low since the Twelve-Day War last year.
  - The weapons shortages are confirmed in September in a report from the Inspector General of the US Army.
- Trump blamed the 2026 Minab school airstrike on the Iranian military, despite overwhelming evidence that holds US military responsible.
- On two occasions on March 16, 2026, Trump claimed that he had recently spoken to a former president who admitted he wished he had bombed Iran during his presidency. Representatives for all living former presidents denied having any such conversation with Trump.
- Trump asserted that the US "knew nothing" about the 2026 South Pars field attack, a major escalation during the Iran war that hightened disruptions in worldwide energy supply. Israeli officials contradicted Trump's statement.
- Trump stated he does not "care" about Iran's stock of highly enriched uranium (HEU), contradicting a key rationale he brought up when starting the war. In fact, Iran's HEU stock is now assessed as a more risky scenario than before the war began. Iran's development of HEU stockpile itself is the consequence of Trump's decision in 2018 to withdraw from a multilateral nuclear deal.
- On May 25, 2026, on Truth Social, Trump recommended that "the Atomic Energy Commission, or its equivalent" witness Iran destroying or surrendering enriched uranium. The U.S. Atomic Energy Commission was dissolved in 1975.
- Since late March up to early June, Trump falsely claimed over 30 times that the United States was supposedly close to an imminent agreement with Iran to end the 2026 Iran war and that Iran and not the US was desperate for a deal.
- In July 2026, Trump claimed "[Iran's] weapons are down 91%". A leaked US intelligence report indicates Iran retained access to 30 out of 33 missile sites across the Strait of Hormuz and 70% of pre-war missiles and launchers.
- One of Trump's rationale for the 2026 Iran war was to achieve regime change by bringing the Iranian opposition to power. He cheered on the Iranian protestors and urged them to "take over", promising that "HELP IS ON ITS WAY". Many Iranians paid for the promise "in blood" during the subsequent massacre of the protestors with many Iranians later reporting a sense of betrayal. Trump later said that he never really believed that the uprising he encouraged would happen anyway.

==== Claims about Venezuela ====
Media and fact-checkers declare that Trump has made several false and unsubstantiated claims regarding Venezuela, reiterated after the 2026 strikes.

- Trump has repeatedly claimed that the Maduro regime released "thousands of prisoners and mentally ill people" into the United States as undocumented immigrants.
- Trump has claimed that the Venezuelan government coordinated with the Tren de Aragua gang to send gang members, drug dealers, and drugs to the US. An intelligence assessment found no such coordination, contradicting these statements used to justify mass deportations and the invocation of the Alien Enemies Act.
- The Trump administration has conducted deadly strikes against small boats in international waters, which Trump claims carry illegal drugs to the US, and that each strike on a Venezuelan boat "saves 25,000 American lives". No evidence has been provided that the vessels belonged to drug traffickers, and the amount of "American lives saved" has been contested. A reason given for the strikes and subsequent actions is Trump's claim that fentanyl, a contributor to the opioid epidemic in the United States, arrives from Venezuela. The claim has been deemed false, since fentanyl arrives mostly from Mexico.
- Trump's description of Venezuela’s nationalization of its oil industry as Venezuela having stolen US oil has been called "baseless."

==== Claims about NATO ====
NATO allies invaded Afghanistan in 2001 when NATO's collective defense provisions were invoked. NATO as an organization officially entered the war in 2003 and maintained combat operations in Afghanistan until 2014. Britain, to cite one country as an example, lost 457 soldiers in the war. Yet on January 22, 2026, Trump said of NATO: "We have never really asked anything of them. You know, they'll say they sent some troops to Afghanistan or this or that, and they did. They stayed a little back, a little off the frontlines."

=== Economy ===
Though Trump claimed in early December 2025—before November numbers were released—that "inflation has stopped", the consumer price index (CPI) began increasing in the months following his April 2025 announcement of tariffs.

Though Trump on December 9, 2025 rated his economy as "A+++++", the unemployment rate had increased during his second term.

Upon imposing the highest U.S. tariffs since the Great Depression (called "Liberation Day" in April 2025), Trump claimed that "jobs and factories will come roaring back". However, manufacturing employment declined every month for the rest of the year.

==== Inflation ====
The Consumer Price Index was 2.7% in November and December 2025, then 2.4% in January and February 2026. On May 12, 2026, Trump falsely said, referring to the Iran war he had begun at the end of February: "If you go back to just before the war, for the last three months, inflation was at 1.7%."

==== Drug prices ====
On July 22, 2025, Trump posted to social media: "We’re gonna get the drug prices down. Not 30% or 40% ... we’re gonna get them down 1,000%, 600%, 500%, 1,500%." Reducing the price of something more than 100% would mean that the seller pays the buyer and not the other way around. When asked about this during a Senate Finance Committee hearing, U.S. Health and Human Services Secretary Robert F. Kennedy Jr. said: “President Trump has his own way of calculating." Kennedy provided the false explanation: "There’s two ways of calculating percentages. If you have a $600 drug, and you reduce it to $10, that’s a 600% reduction.”

==== Grocery prices ====
In an interview that aired on Fox News on November 10, 2025, Trump asserted that "prices are down" and that only beef and coffee prices remained high. University of Michigan economics professor Justin Wolfers told CNN the next day that, to the contrary, "almost every category of goods or services sees the prices rising".

=== Family ===
==== Uncle's acquaintance with Ted Kaczynski ====
On July 15, 2025, Trump spoke at an "Energy and Innovation" event in Pittsburgh, Pennsylvania. During discussion of artificial intelligence, Trump professed to the intelligence of his uncle Prof. John G. Trump with a false anecdote of Prof. Trump teaching Ted Kaczynski (who he commented "very little difference between a madman and a genius") at the Massachusetts Institute of Technology, and their supposed reaction to Kaczynski's identification as the Unabomber; this is impossible as John Trump died in 1985, a decade before Kaczynski was identified as the Unabomber and arrested in 1996. Kaczynski was an alumnus of Harvard University and the University of Michigan, having never attended MIT, a fact confirmed by MIT in response to Donald Trump's claim. Kaczynski could not contest Trump's claim, having himself died in 2023. Trump also miscredited his uncle as having university degrees "in nuclear, chemical, and math"; Prof. Trump actually had a Bachelor of Science and Doctor of Science in electrical engineering, and a Master of Science in physics.

==== Father's birthplace ====
On March 3, 2026, Trump acknowledged that his mother was born in the UK. Then, gesturing at German Chancellor Friedrich Merz, he said: "my father was born there." Though Fred Trump was born in New York City, Donald Trump has repeatedly falsely claimed he was born in Germany.

=== Killing of U.S. citizens in Operation Metro Surge ===
==== Killing of Renée Good ====
On January 7, 2026, in Minneapolis, a 37-year-old woman uninvolved in ongoing protests against ICE deployment, Renée Nicole Good, was killed by an ICE agent. Good was driving when several masked ICE agents conflictingly ordered her to drive away from the scene and get out of her vehicle, and was fatally shot by one agent when she attempted to drive away. Addressing the shooting death on Truth Social within hours, Trump denounced Good as "very disorderly, obstructing and resisting, who then violently, willfully, and viciously ran over the ICE Officer, who seems to have shot her in self defense," adding that it is "hard to believe [the agent] is alive, but is now recovering in the hospital".

Good's family say she had not planned any involvement in the protest, and was returning home with her wife after bringing their son to school. Video recordings of the incident show that Good's vehicle never struck any of the agents, and the shooting officer had fled the scene in his own vehicle with no apparent injuries, but had reportedly visited hospital for treatment according to DHS.

Subsequently, Trump reiterated his claims, which were supported and amplified by officials of his administration, such as JD Vance and Kristi Noem. Trump, in turn, repeated their amplifications, adding new falsehoods.

==== Killing of Alex Pretti ====
On January 24, 2026, a 37-year-old American intensive care nurse for the Department of Veterans Affairs, Alex Jeffrey Pretti, was shot and killed by Border Patrol agents in Minneapolis.

On the same day, Trump posted about the incident, calling Pretti a "gunman," mentioning the Minnesota fraud scandal, and adding that "[t]he Mayor and the Governor are inciting Insurrection, with their pompous, dangerous, and arrogant rhetoric!" Officials of his administration, such as Gregory Bovino, Kristi Noem, Stephen Miller, and JD Vance, gave press conferences, talked in interviews, and posted on social media, stating that the deceased had behaved violently and threatened the agents, who shot him in self-defense. They also blamed Governor Tim Walz, Mayor Jacob Frey, liberal activists, and the media for the incidents leading to the shooting, accusing them of not helping the federal forces and of fueling chaos.

Videos recorded at the scene by witnesses contradicted the official position, followed by reports and analysis by fact checkers and the media, which declared that the Trump administration had made false and misleading statements.

The local authorities rebuked the Trump administration's accusations, and the parents of Alex Pretti called those statements "sickening lies (...) reprehensible and disgusting," requesting to "get the truth out" about their son. On January 28, a video showing a prior confrontation between Pretti and ICE surfaced. After that, Trump posted on Truth Social several times, amplifying accusations of Alex Pretti being a "domestic terrorist," calling him an "agitator" and "insurrectionist," and overlaying the footage with Sen. Elizabeth Warren reading a post praising Pretti. Several media outlets pointed out that this was another attempt at victim blaming, and that Pretti's past actions didn't justify his killing days after.

=== Announcement of Sylvester Stallone as ambassador to Hollywood ===
On January 16, 2025, Trump announced via social media that he was appointing Sylvester Stallone, Mel Gibson, and Jon Voight as "Special Ambassadors" to Hollywood. In September 2026, Stallone admitted that had not been asked prior to the announcement and later called Trump to reject the position. The White House never corrected the record, and his rejection was unknown until Gibson spoke about it one year and nine months later.

=== Alleged apology from Tucker Carlson ===
On June 13, 2025, Tucker Carlson accused Trump of having been "complicit" in Israel's attack on Iran. On June 18, 2025, Trump told White House reporters that Carlson "called and apologized the other day because he thought he had said things that were a little bit too strong, and I appreciate that." However, when (in an interview that aired July 19), a German journalist asked Carlson if this was true, Carlson denied having made any such phone call or apology.

=== Jeffrey Epstein hoax ===
On July 12, 2025, during the controversy related to Jeffrey Epstein's client list, Trump posted on Truth Social in defense of Pam Bondi's handling of the case, stating that the file had been "written by Obama, Crooked Hillary, Comey, Brennan, and the Losers and Criminals of the Biden Administration, who conned the World with the Russia, Russia, Russia Hoax, 51 'Intelligence' Agents, 'THE LAPTOP FROM HELL';" he compared the "Epstein Files" to the Steele dossier declaring both as "FAKE", and requested MAGA to "not waste Time and Energy on Jeffrey Epstein, somebody that nobody cares about." Trump's post was not well received by his supporters.

On July 16, he posted again on the subject, declaring it was a "totally fake and made up story" created by Democrats, and stating: "Their new SCAM is what we will forever call the Jeffrey Epstein Hoax", a label he continued to use thereafter. Trump's labelling of the Jeffrey Epstein case as a hoax made up by Democrats was declared as a falsehood by the media.

On the July 17 episode of Morning Joe, Joe Scarborough noted that Trump supporters have been the ones talking about the case "for years", that it has been "almost a foundational belief for MAGA", and that Trump calling it a Democratic hoax, "it's just not true." Willie Geist noted the case existed and asked, "What part of this is a hoax?" Clips of Charlie Kirk, Benny Johnson, and Alex Jones, along with a tweet by Michael Flynn, were featured, calling for transparency regarding the case. Scarborough noted that Trump's false claim makes other claims of his dubious, and it is a baffling strategy.

=== Firing of Erika McEntarfer ===
On July 31, 2025, Trump issued an executive order imposing tariffs on imports from many of America's trading partners. On August 1, the Bureau of Labor Statistics released its monthly report on job creation, indicating that only 73,000 jobs were added in July, significantly below the expected 115,000. Additionally, revisions reduced 258,000 jobs from the May and June reports, increasing the unemployment rate to 4.2%. Maria Bartiromo delivered the news live on Mornings with Maria; the panel members elaborated on the likely reasons for those results and possible ways to address the issues.

Officials such as Stephen Miran, Karoline Leavitt, and Secretary of Labor Lori Chavez-DeRemer sought to explain the report's results and to reassure the public on the grounds that the weak performance was tied to the fate of Trump's domestic spending legislation and the outcome of the tariff policy. They said that as Congress had passed the One Big Beautiful Bill Act, deregulations are being enacted, federal expenses are being cut, inflation has decreased, wages have increased, and new tariff deals that will rake in "billions of dollars" have been announced, uncertainty ended; Trump's policies are starting to sort into place, as the numbers still show that jobs for American workers are increasing.

Trump fired BLS director Erika McEntarfer soon after a downward revision to the July 2025 employment statistic, but subsequent months showed no net improvement over July's number. In December 2025, Trump rated his economy as "A+++++".

Later on August 1, 2025, Trump ordered the firing of the Commissioner of the Bureau of Labor Statistics Erika McEntarfer, stating without evidence, both in posts on Truth Social and public statements, that she had "rigged" the numbers, that is, that she had previously inflated the numbers to favor Kamala Harris's presidential bidding, that she had reduced his numbers to make him look bad, and the numbers were "a scam, in my opinion." Trump's officials, such as Secretary of Labor Lori Chavez-DeRemer, and Kevin Hassett, defended his decision on the grounds that the economy is growing; BLS's massive revisions since COVID make no sense and have been detrimental to the markets; the President has the right to fire the BLS head; the Bureau needs overhauling, to revise its formulas, and to be apolitical; their duty is to support the President, who is doing a great job; and reliable information, and transparency, are important for the economy.

Fact-checkers and the media established that Trump's claims were false, based on the way the data are collected and processed, which prevents the Commissioner from tampering with them; releases are regular; revisions are routine due to low response to the surveys, lack of resources, and the firing of the Technical Advisory Committee and Data Users Advisory Committee; his timeline doesn't match reality; and Trump has a history of claiming that the BLS data are biased against him.

Trump announced he would soon choose a replacement for Ms. McEntarfer, "somebody who's gonna be honest" On August 7, Stephen Moore made an impromptu presentation at the Oval Office to defend Trump's decision, showing a series of graphs favorable to him. With the first one, Moore stated that the reports' revisions manifested errors and incompetence, whereas Trump declared it was made purposely. The other graphs showed increasing or larger household income under Trump, "based on unpublished Census Bureau data", mostly by comparing Trump's first term's numbers to Biden's, including the impact of COVID in one graph. The media noted that revisions are usual, the graphs' data were unverifiable, and it was not explained how they were calculated for the graphs. On August 11, Trump named E.J. Antoni as McEntarfer's replacement.

=== Killing of Rob Reiner ===
On December 14, 2025, American film producer Rob Reiner and his wife Michele Singer Reiner, both highly critical of Trump, were fatally stabbed in their Brentwood, Los Angeles home. In response to the news of the Reiners' deaths, Trump made a post to Truth Social the morning of December 15, 2025, blaming Rob Reiner for his and his wife's deaths: Trump insulted Reiner as "a tortured and struggling, but once very talented movie director and comedy star" and asserted the motive for the murder was "reportedly due to the anger he caused others through his massive, unyielding, and incurable affliction with a mind crippling disease known as TRUMP DERANGEMENT SYNDROME, sometimes referred to as TDS.”

While Los Angeles Police Department arrested the Reiners' son Nick for their double murder, the LAPD had yet to issue any statement to a motive, let alone one related to right-wing extremism. "Trump Derangement Syndrome" is not a recognized disease, and is instead seen as an example of political abuse of psychiatry.

=== Climate ===
Contrary to Trump's claims, global temperature datasets from various scientific organizations show persistent long-term global warming.

On April 17, 2026, following the hottest March on record, Trump said people had dropped the term "global warming" and switched to the term "climate change" because "we were actually cooling as a planet".

On May 16, 2026, Trump falsely claimed that "the United Nations TOP Climate Committee just admitted that its own projections (RCP8.5) were WRONG! WRONG! WRONG!" In fact, RCP 8.5 is a worst-case (90th percentile) greenhouse gas emissions scenario—not a specific global warming projection—that had not even been developed by the UN's IPCC.

=== Lincoln Memorial Reflecting Pool ===
On April 23, 2026, Trump announced a renovation project on the Lincoln Memorial Reflecting Pool, resurfacing the bottom with "American flag blue" paint (presumed to mean the color "Old Glory Blue"). Since this announcement, Trump has made several false and misleading statement regarding the pool, its history, and plans for his project. On several occasions, Trump stated he had provided federal contracts with three contractors from Atlantic Industrial Coatings (which had previously performed work at the Trump National Golf Club Washington, D.C.), though on May 12 denied to allege that the United States Department of the Interior had hired contractors unaffiliated with him; Atlantic Industrial Coatings retained contract.

On April 25, Trump posted to TruthSocial two versions of a photo of the reflection pool: one unaltered labeled "Hussein Obama" (emphasizing Obama's middle name to imply he is Muslim) where the water contained algae, and another labeled "Trump" where the water was photoshopped to appear blue. On May 1, Trump posted an AI-generated photo of himself, Marco Rubio, and Doug Burgum wading in the reflecting pool with an undistinguished woman in a bikini. It is illegal to enter the pool during opening hours, and impossible to swim in due to a maximum depth of only 30 inches.

On May 7, Trump claimed that initial estimates for renovating the reflecting pool would cost $355 million and take 3.5 years to complete, but asserted that his project would cost only $1.8 million and take one week. Trump issued amendments over the coming weeks stating the project would be completed in "a couple of weeks", and costs for project ended up nearing $16 million by mid June: the painting of the reflecting pool itself costing $14.65 million, with attempts to clean the water costing $1.74 million.

On May 27, Trump falsely asserted about previous renovations to the reflecting pool, claiming “the Biden administration and the Obama administration spent hundreds of millions of dollars trying to get it to work, and they failed." While the 2009 restoration did see problems with algae and poisoning of waterfowl, the 18-month-long project under Obama's first term only cost $30.74 million, and no major repairs to the pool were done under Biden. Trump also claimed the pool (measuring by 2,028 by 167 feet) is "longer than the tallest building in the world if you set it on the side, and it's almost 200 feet wide." The three tallest buildings in the world exceed the pool's dimensions. On June 22, Trump reiterated falsehoods about Obama and Biden: claiming they intended to spend $300–$400 million on renovations; the pool was rarely open during their presidencies; and algal growth under Obama was due to "putrid" water being drawn directly from the Potomac River, costing $100 million in repairs. Water was and continues under Obama's successors to be drawn from the Tidal Basin, and the 2012 draining and cleaning cost only $100,000. Trump also threatened to sue ABC News for not reporting his inflated numbers.

Within days of the reflecting pool being reflooded June 5, algal growth formed in the water, and attempts to combat this were made by pouring hydrogen peroxide in the water. When the paint began to peel, on June 19, Trump started blaming the peeling and algal growth on alleged vandals opposed to his presidency. Later, Trump claimed June 22 he "saw" vandals use "a box-cutter or a knife of some kind" to cut and pull off the paint "violently". Trump also claimed vandals had poured fertilizer in the water to cause algal growth, and began dismissing protestors at the reflecting pool as paid actors. Multiple media outlets stated there is no evidence for Trump's claims. Engineers and pool experts interviewed by the Scientific American postulated that the peeling might have been caused by a variety of factors: the incorrect curing time between applications of the polyurea resurfacant layers, the adhesive properties of polyurea to granite, hot summer temperatures or UV radiation; the application of hydrogen peroxide could have possibly contributed, but was likely too diluted to account for the magnitude of the damage to the Reflecting Pool. Writing in Jalopnik, car enthusiast Justin Hughes speculated some damages could also be placed more directly on Trump himself: on May 7, Trump had a 15-car motorcade of both presidential limousines and Secret Service vehicles run over the drained pool bed. Hughes theorized the concrete slabs of the pool supported by timber pilings cracked under the weight of the vehicles (between six to ten tons individually), allowing groundwater to later lift up the pool sealant, or the sealant may have been damaged by the vehicles directly.

On July 31, 2026, in a motion to drop charges against a man arrested and charged for reportedly vandalizing the pool, Jeanne Pirro directly contradicted Trump's claim that the damage was caused by knives, writing "the damage was the result of a botched installation and not vandalism.” The filing goes on to say that information recently provided by the Department of Interior proves the damage was in fact caused by a "flawed installation by the contractor." The following day, Trump repeated the falsehood on Truth Social, insisting the incident was a case of vandalism. "I disagree 100% with Jeanine Pirro,” Trump wrote on Truth Social. “I don’t know what she was thinking?”

=== 2026 White House Correspondents' Dinner shooting ===
Before the contents of the alleged suspect's manifesto was disclosed, on April 26, 2026, Trump claimed it and the suspect were "anti-Christian". The manifesto contained no language persecutive of Christians, and instead used religious justifications to the attempt through references to the Gospel of Matthew: The manifesto stated the interpretation that "turning the other cheek when *someone else* is oppressed is not Christian behavior; it is complicity in the oppressor's crimes" (in reference to Matthew 5:39) and advocated to "yield unto Caesar what belongs to Caesar" (Matthew 22:21).

On April 27, Trump took issue with a joke Jimmy Kimmel made on his show days prior where Kimmel pretended to be the host of the upcoming White House Correspondents' Dinner and stated "Our first lady Melania is here... So beautiful, Mrs. Trump, you have a glow like an expectant widow."; while the joke was at the expense of age and health concerns about Donald Trump, Trump equated it as a call to violence and called for Kimmel's firing from ABC. The next day, Trump made a similar joke to Melania that “[his parents Fred Trump and Mary Anne MacLeod] were married for 63 years" and "That’s a record [he and Melania] won’t be able to match [...] Just not going to work out that way”; this joke was denounced as hypocritical by Kimmel.

=== Elections ===
In the 2024 election, Trump won 31 states. On June 4, 2026, Trump suggested that there had been a fraudulent undercount, saying: "Probably we won all 50 [states] if we had an honest count if you wanna know the truth."

== See also ==
- False or misleading statements by Donald Trump (first term)
- False or misleading statements by Donald Trump (between terms)
