= History of the University of Chicago =

== Founding ==
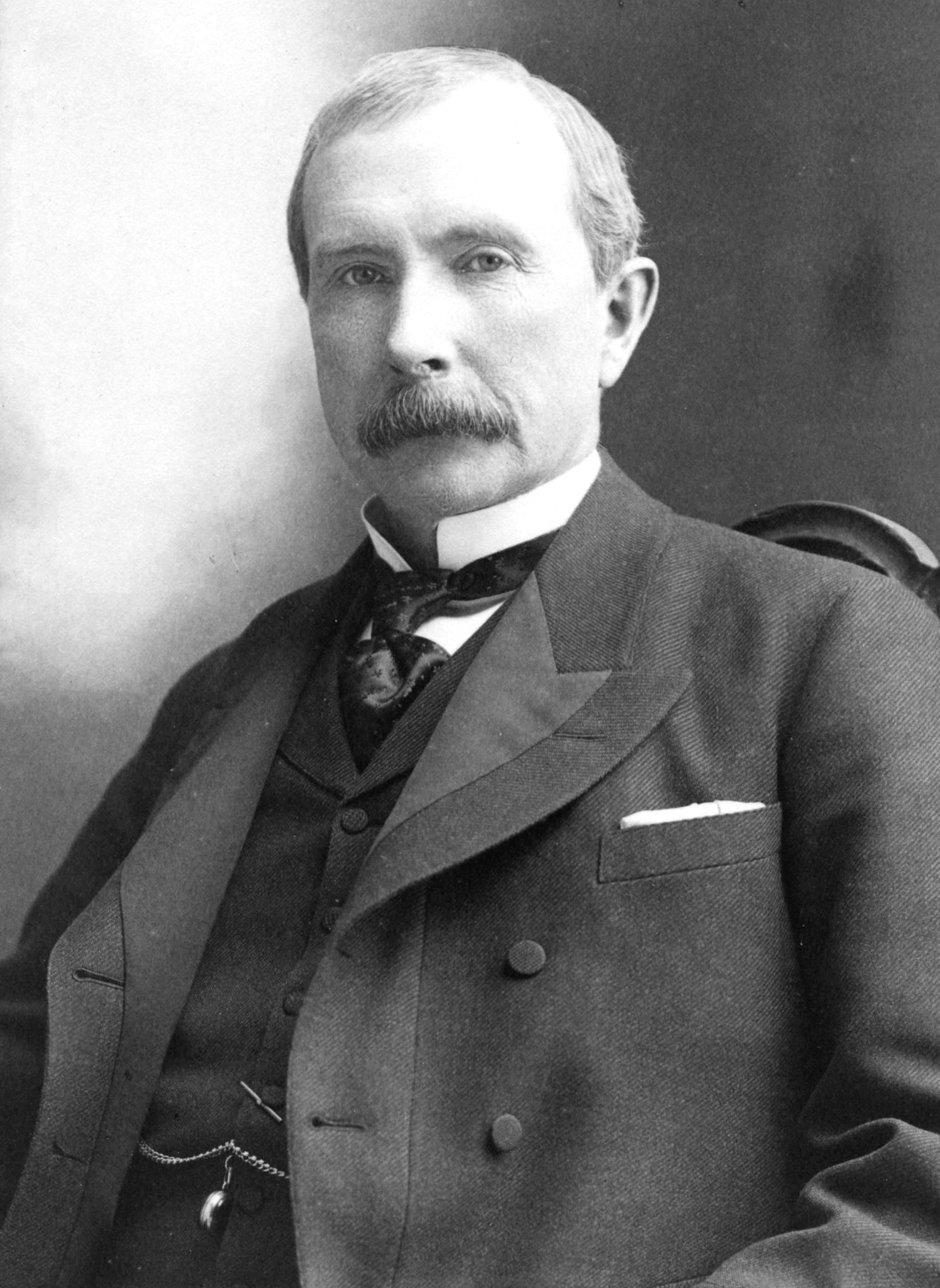
John D. Rockefeller funded the University of Chicago along with the American Baptist Education Society.

=== Philanthropy and early advocacy ===
John Boyer said that the key promoters Frederick Gates and Thomas Goodspeed

"...in 1888 and 1889, were acutely aware of the misery and public humiliation that had accompanied the collapse of the first institution, having had considerable difficulty raising the $400,000 needed to match John D. Rockefeller’s historic offer of $600,000 to recreate a first-rate Baptist college in Chicago."

=== Campus establishment and early governance ===
The University of Chicago's Hyde Park campus was established in 1890, through the efforts of the American Baptist Education Society and oil magnate John D. Rockefeller, who later called it "the best investment I ever made." The original tract of land, comprising the current main quads, was donated by Marshall Field, owner of the Marshall Field and Company department store. Other Chicagoans made financial donations to match Rockefeller's offer. Martin A. Ryerson (1856–1932) served as the president of the board of trustees of the university from 1892 to 1922. He donated over $2 million to the university, including $350,000 for the construction of the Ryerson Physical Laboratory, and endowed the Martin A. Ryerson Distinguished Service Professorship in 1925.

=== Institutional succession ===
The University of Chicago replaced the defunct institution of the same name, which was legally renamed the Old University of Chicago to avoid confusion. Graduates of the Old Chicago University were later included in the ranks of the alumni of the University of Chicago.

=== Founding in the research university tradition ===
The university's founding was part of a wave of research university foundings that started with Cornell University (1865) and Johns Hopkins University (1876), emulating the research-oriented German universities such as the Humboldt University of Berlin. Incorporated in 1890, the university dates its founding to July 1, 1891, when William Rainey Harper became its first president. The first classes were held on October 1, 1892, with an enrollment of 594 men and women and a faculty of 120, including eight former college presidents.

=== Location, national context, and founding ideals ===
Westward migration, population growth, and industrialization had led to an increasing need for elite schools away from the East Coast, especially schools that would focus on issues vital to national development. Rockefeller ultimately chose Chicago. His choice reflected his strong desire to realize Thomas Jefferson's dream of a natural meritocracy's rise to prominence, determined by talent rather than familial heritage. Rockefeller's early fiscal emphasis on the physics department showed his pragmatic desires for the school.

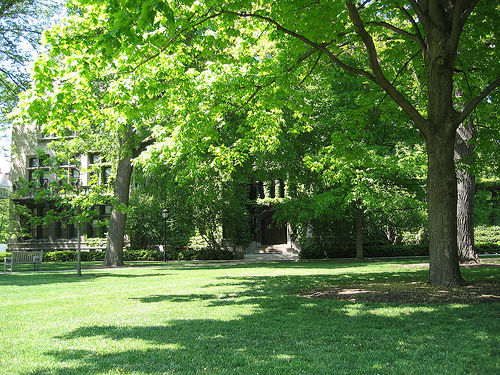
Ryerson Physical Laboratory, located on the Main Quadrangles.

=== Early academic leadership and professional schools ===
President Harper was a scholar of religion and a Baptist clergyman. He believed that a university should include the study of faith to prepare students for careers in teaching and research and ministers for service to the church and community.

Acting on this belief, he moved the Morgan Park Seminary of the Baptist Theological Union to Hyde Park. This led to the founding of the Divinity School in 1891, making it the first professional school at the new university.

Although the university had Baptist roots, it was never formally tied to any religious denomination. Other professional schools soon followed. The business school opened in 1898, and the law school was founded in 1902.

During this period, the university also founded the Oriental Institute, which focused on archaeological research and interpretation in the Near East.

Harper died in 1906. He was succeeded by three presidents whose combined leadership lasted until 1929.

=== Graduate education and institutional structure ===
Like the other research universities at the time, the University of Chicago thus came to revolve around a number of graduate research institutions, following Germanic precedent. The College of the University of Chicago remained quite small compared to its East Coast peers, such as Harvard, Yale and Princeton, until around the middle of the 20th century. The undergraduate school paid the graduate students for much of the teaching and thereby provided tuition money to fund the graduate programs. As a result, the graduate population of the university dwarfs the undergraduate population 2:1 to this day, while the university's undergraduate student body remains the third smallest amongst the top 10 national universities. The student-to-faculty ratio is 4:1, one of the lowest amongst national universities, and nearly all faculty members teach undergraduate courses.

=== Academic oversight ===
In the 1890s, the university, concerned that its vast resources would injure smaller schools by drawing away good students, affiliated with several regional colleges and universities: Des Moines College, Kalamazoo College, Butler University, and Stetson University. In 1896, the university affiliated with Shimer College in Mount Carroll, Illinois. Under the terms of the affiliation, the schools were required to have courses of study comparable to those at the university, to notify the university early of any contemplated faculty appointments or dismissals, to make no faculty appointment without the university's approval, and to send copies of examinations for suggestions. The University of Chicago agreed to confer a degree to any graduating senior from an affiliated school who made a grade of A for all four years, and on any other graduate who took twelve weeks additional study at the University of Chicago. A student or faculty member of an affiliated school was entitled to free tuition at the University of Chicago, and Chicago students were eligible to attend an affiliated school on the same terms and receive credit for their work. The University of Chicago also agreed to provide affiliated schools with books and scientific apparatus and supplies at cost; special instructors and lecturers without cost except for travel expenses; and a copy of every book and journal published by the University of Chicago Press at no cost. The agreement provided that either party could terminate the affiliation on proper notice. Several University of Chicago professors disliked the program, as it involved uncompensated additional labor on their part, and they believed it cheapened the academic reputation of the university. The program was ended by 1910.

=== Access and inclusion ===
The school's academic culture was shaped early by its presidents, William Rainey Harper and Robert Maynard Hutchins. From its founding, University of Chicago admitted women and students from racial minorities at a time when many leading universities excluded them.

The university was the first major institution of higher education to enroll women and men on equal terms. In 1947, it also became the first major predominantly white university to grant tenure to a Black professor.

== Presidency of Robert Hutchins ==
During his presidency, Robert Maynard Hutchins met with the president of academic rival Northwestern University to discuss the future of the two institutions through the Depression and the looming war. Hutchins concluded that, in order to secure the future of both universities, it was in the best interest of both for the two campuses to merge as "The Universities of Chicago", with Northwestern's Evanston campus serving as the site for undergraduate education and the University of Chicago's Hyde Park campus serving as the graduate studies campus. President Hutchins' vision for what he hoped would become the preeminent university in the world eventually faltered amidst opposition from several groups, most notably Northwestern's medical faculty. Hutchins called the episode "one of the lost opportunities of American education."

Starting in the 1930s, the university conducted a more successful experiment on the college. Administrators decided to implement President Hutchins' philosophy of secular perennialism, which led to the introduction of the common core. The new curriculum implemented an educational strategy in which students read original source materials rather than textbooks and discussed them in small groups using the Socratic method rather than a lecture approach. The common core is still an important feature of Chicago's undergraduate education. In addition to this new undergraduate curriculum, the university took steps to eliminate "distractions" such as varsity sports, fraternities, and religious organizations. This attracted both Carl Sagan and Kurt Vonnegut to the university. The university succeeded in eliminating all varsity sports for 20 years and all but five fraternities, although three of the eliminated fraternities were re-chartered in the 1980s.

== Science at Chicago ==
The University of Chicago has made contributions to 20th century science. In 1909, Professor Robert Andrews Millikan performed the oil-drop experiment in the Ryerson Physical Laboratory on the university campus. This experiment allowed Millikan to calculate the charge of an electron and paved the way for the theory of quantum mechanics in the 1940s. The American Physical Society now designates Ryerson Laboratory a historic physics site.

As part of the Manhattan Project, University of Chicago chemists, led by Glenn T. Seaborg, began to study the newly manufactured radioactive element plutonium. The George Herbert Jones Laboratory was the site where, for the first time, a trace quantity of this new element was isolated and measured in September 1942. This procedure enabled chemists to determine the new element's atomic weight. Room 405 of the building was named a National Historic Landmark in May 1967.

On December 2, 1942, scientists achieved the world's first self-sustained nuclear reaction at a university athletic field known as Stagg Field under the direction of professor Enrico Fermi. A sculpture by Henry Moore marks the spot, now deemed a National Historic Landmark, where the nuclear reaction took place. The original Stagg Field has since been demolished to make way for the Regenstein Library.

Other scientific discoveries that have taken place at the University of Chicago include:

- The technique of radiocarbon dating, developed in 1949 by Willard Libby and his team during his tenure as a professor at the university. Libby was awarded the Nobel Prize in Chemistry in 1960 for this discovery.
- The discovery of the atmosphere's jet stream.
- The discovery of REM sleep.
- The discovery of synchronized menstrual cycles.
- The famous Miller–Urey experiment, considered to be the classic experiment on the origin of life.
- The development of Agent Orange, a highly-toxic herbicide that would gain notoriety for its use during the Malayan Emergency and the Vietnam War.
- The prediction of white dwarfs and black holes by Subrahmanyan Chandrasekhar, who won the Nobel Prize in Physics in 1983.

== Arts at Chicago ==
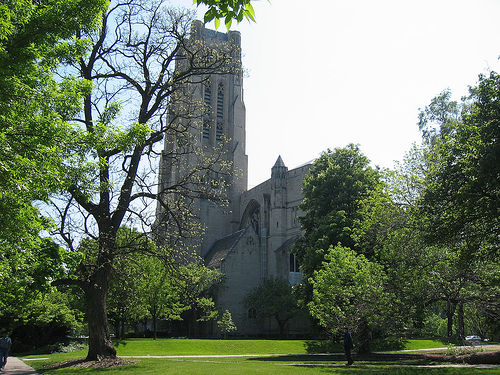
The Rockefeller Chapel, the tallest structure on campus.

Although the University of Chicago is better known for its academic and scientific achievements, its students and faculty have also made contributions to the arts. In 1955, the University of Chicago became the birthplace of improvisational comedy with the formation of the undergraduate comedy troupe, the Compass Players. In 1959, alumnus Paul Sills, who many consider the father of improvisational theater, founded The Second City along with Bernard Sahlins, also a graduate of the university. Since its founding, The Second City Theater has inspired other comedy troupes such as Saturday Night Live, as well as serving as a starting point for artists such as Alan Arkin, Mike Nichols, Harold Ramis, Bill Murray, Mike Myers, Stephen Colbert, Tina Fey, Jack McBrayer, and Steve Carell.

In 1964, Professor Ralph Shapey founded the University of Chicago Contemporary Chamber Players, one of the oldest professional new music groups in the nation. The Contemporary Chamber Players, also known as "contempo", has given over eighty world premieres of established and emerging composers.

While teaching on the Committee on Social Thought, Professor Saul Bellow wrote several best-selling novels, including Herzog in 1964 and Humboldt's Gift in 1975, for which he was awarded the 1976 Pulitzer Prize for Fiction and Nobel Prize in Literature.

The University of Chicago also founded the Renaissance Society in 1915, which is devoted to the exhibition of contemporary art. The Society's 1934 exhibition of Alexander Calder's "mobiles" and its 1936 survey of paintings and drawings by Fernand Léger were the first solo exhibitions of these artists in the United States.

The Smart Museum was established in 1974 in association with the University of Chicago's Art History department. It was endowed by David A. Smart and his brother Alfred Smart. In 1983, the museum became a separate unit of the university devoted to serving the entire community, including educational outreach activities in local public schools. In 2000, it completed a $2 million renovation.

== 1950s–1980s ==
In the early 1950s, student applications declined as a result of increasing crime and poverty in the Hyde Park neighborhood. In response, the university became a major sponsor of a controversial urban renewal project for Hyde Park, which profoundly affected both the neighborhood's architecture and street plan. For details of this urban renewal effort, see Hyde Park.

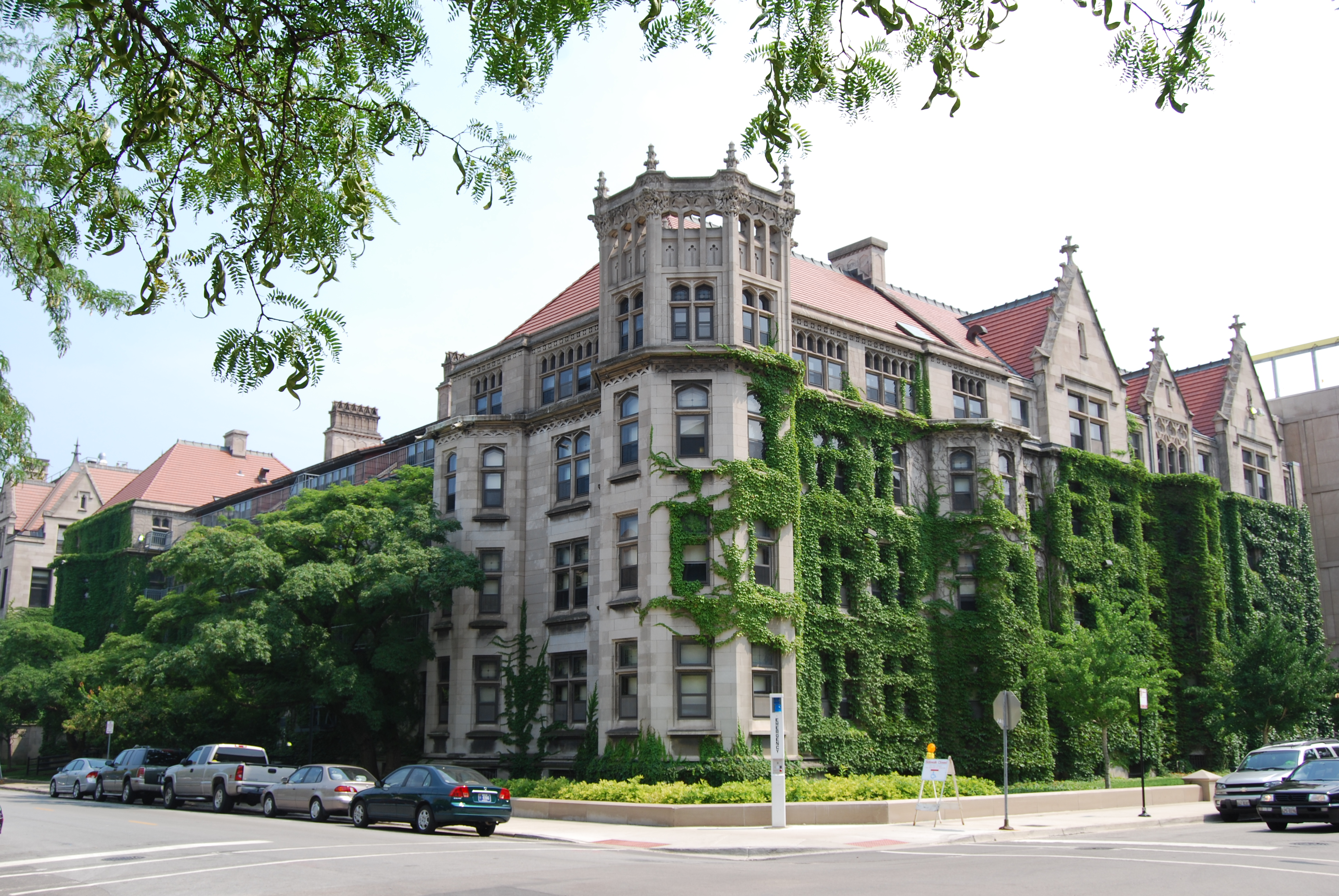
Snell and Hitchcock Halls, the oldest residence halls still in use on campus

The Spring 1958 edition of the university's literary journal the Chicago Review, edited by Irving Rosenthal and Paul Carroll, published excerpts from William S. Burroughs’ experimental novel Naked Lunch. The university was criticized for publishing fiction deemed obscene by a columnist in the Chicago Daily News and suppressed the Winter 1959 issue, which contained more material from the Naked Lunch manuscript. The university administration fired Rosenthal and Carroll, who regarded the university's attempt at suppressing Naked Lunch as censorship.

The university experienced its share of student unrest during the 1960s, beginning in 1962, when students occupied President George Beadle's office in a protest over the university's off-campus rental policies. In 1969, more than 400 students, angry about the dismissal of a popular professor, Marlene Dixon, occupied the Administration Building for two weeks. After the sit-in ended, when Dixon turned down a one-year reappointment, 42 students were expelled and 81 were suspended, the most severe response to student occupations of any American university during the student movement.

In 1978, Hanna Holborn Gray, then the provost of Yale University, became President of the University of Chicago, the first woman ever to serve as the full president of a major research university.

== 1990s–present ==
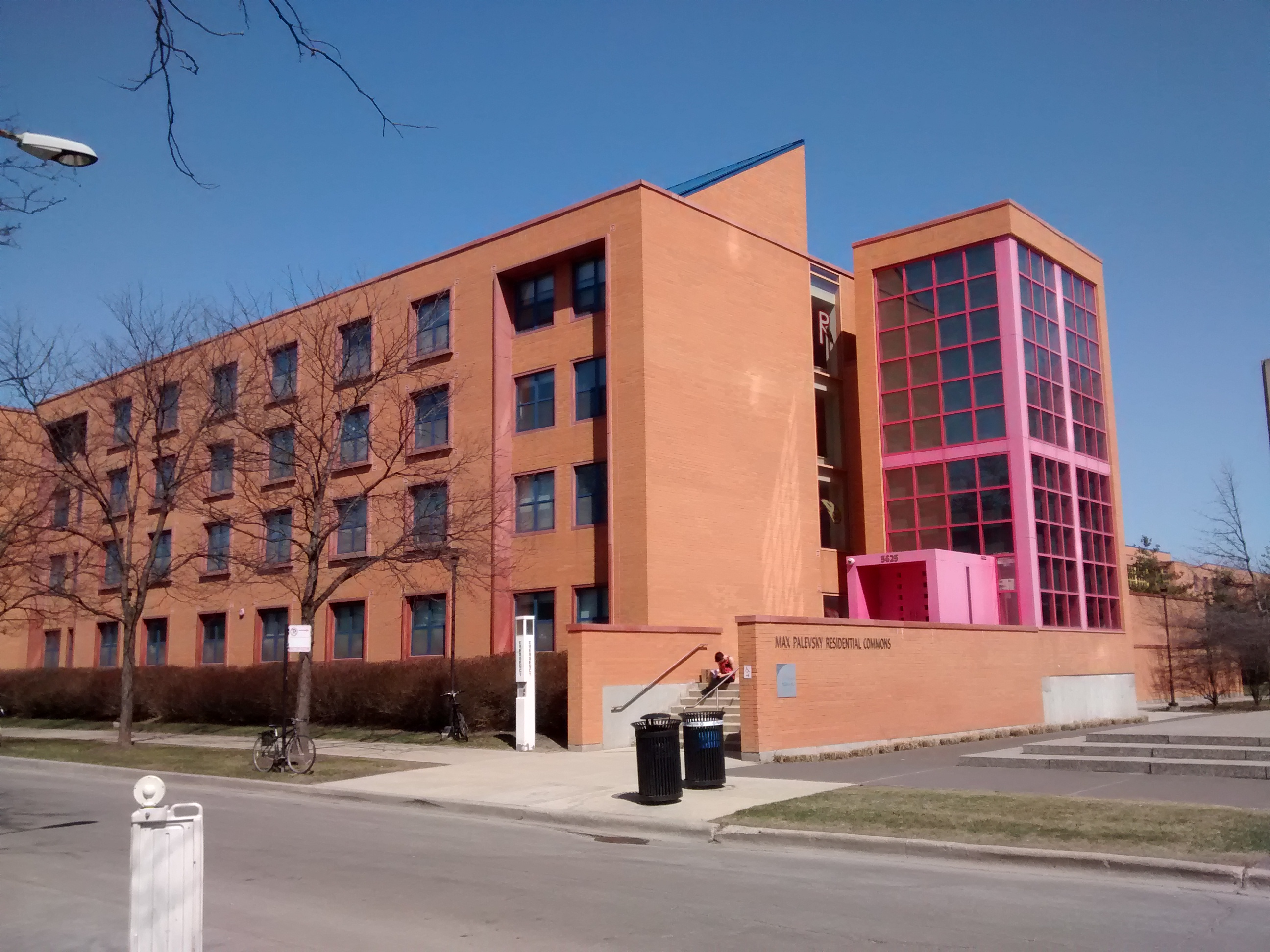
Max Palevsky Residential Commons, an undergraduate dormitory that opened in 2002.

In 1990, the Consortium on Chicago School Research (CCSR) was created after the passage of the Chicago School Reform Act that decentralized governance of the city's public schools. Researchers at the University of Chicago joined with researchers from Chicago Public Schools and other organizations to form the CCSR with the goal of studying this landmark restructuring and its long-term effects. Since then, the CCSR has undertaken research on many of Chicago's school reform efforts, some of which have been embraced by other cities as well. Thus, CCSR studies have also informed broader national movements in public education.

On May 21, 1991, Divinity School professor Ioan P. Culianu was assassinated in a bathroom stall on the third floor of Swift Hall.

In 1999, then-President Hugo Sonnenschein announced plans to relax the university's famed core curriculum, reducing the number of required courses from 21 to 15. When The New York Times, The Economist, and other major news outlets picked up this story, the university became the focal point of a national debate on education. The changes were ultimately implemented, but the controversy led to President Sonnenschein's resignation in 2000.

In 2006, the University of Chicago's Oriental Institute became the center of controversy when U.S. federal courts ruled to seize and auction its valuable collection of ancient Persian artifacts, the proceeds of which would go to compensate the victims of a 1997 bombing in Jerusalem that the United States believes was funded by Iran. The ruling threatens the university's invaluable collection of ancient clay tablets held by the Oriental Institute since the 1930s but officially owned by Iran.

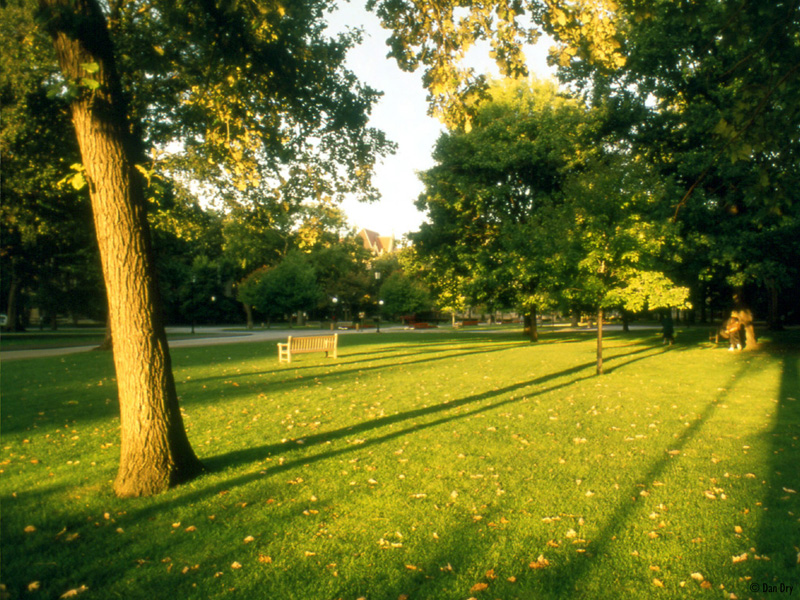
The quadrangles of the University of Chicago were modeled after Oxford and Cambridge universities.

In 2007, the University of Chicago received a $35 million donation from David and Reva Logan to be used toward the construction of the Reva and David Logan Center for the Arts. The new arts center "will be a venue for the artistic expression and multidisciplinary inquiry, performance and production of our faculty and students", said President Robert Zimmer in his May 3 note. The building was constructed next to Midway Studios, which was the personal residence and studio for sculptor Lorado Taft. The university selected the firm of Tod Williams Billie Tsien Architects to design the center.

Later in 2007, the University of Chicago received a donation of $100 million from anonymous donor known only as "Homer". The donation will be used as the cornerstone of a $400 million undergraduate student aid initiative. Beginning in the fall of 2008, students became eligible for enhanced financial aid packages called Odyssey Scholarships, which aim to eliminate student loans entirely among students whose annual family income is less than $75,000 and to eliminate half the student loan packages among students whose annual family income is between $75,000 and $90,000. The college expected nearly a quarter of the entire College population to benefit from the program.

In 2008, the University of Chicago announced plans to establish the Milton Friedman Institute. Friedman, a Nobel Laureate in economics, received his A.M. in economics from the university in 1933 and was a professor at the University of Chicago for over thirty years. The institute cost around $200 million and occupies the buildings of the Chicago Theological Seminary. Some faculty members and students petitioned against these plans. During the same year, investor David G. Booth donated $300 million to the university's Graduate School of Business, which is the largest gift in the university's history and the largest gift ever to any business school.

Also in 2008, the University of Chicago and particularly its surrounding neighborhood of Hyde Park attracted international media attention because of former Law School lecturer Barack Obama's election as President of the United States.

== See also ==
- List of University of Chicago people
- Chicago school of economics
  - Becker Friedman Institute for Research in Economics, since 2011
  - Milton Friedman Institute for Research in Economics, 2008–2011
- Chicago school (sociology)
- Committee on Social Thought, interdisciplinary intellectual history, since 1941
- Crown Family School of Social Work, Policy, and Practice
- The Institute for the Study of Ancient Cultures, West Asia & North Africa (ISAC); before 2023 it was "the Oriental Institute," established in 1919.
- Pritzker School of Medicine
  - University of Chicago Medical Center
- Regenstein Library, the main library since 1970.
  - University of Chicago Graduate Library School, 1928–1989, now closed
- Smart Museum of Art
  - Renaissance Society, art museum on campus; since 1915, an independent affiliate
- University of Chicago Booth School of Business
- University of Chicago Divinity School
- University of Chicago Hong Kong, since 2018
- University of Chicago Laboratory Schools, for pre-K to grade 12
- University of Chicago Law School
- Harris School of Public Policy
- University of Chicago Press
  - List of University of Chicago Press journals
