= Chad Syverson =

American professor of economics

Academic background
- Education: University of North Dakota (BA), University of Maryland (PhD)
- Doctoral advisor: John Haltiwanger; John Shea

Academic work
- Discipline: Industrial organization
- Institutions: University of Chicago
- Awards: Distinguished Fellow Award, Industrial Organization Society (2025)
- Website: Information at IDEAS / RePEc

Chad Syverson is an economics professor at the University of Chicago. His research forces on industrial organization and productivity. In 2020 he was named the George C. Tiao Distinguished Service Professor of Economics at the Chicago Booth School of Business. In 2025, he became Deputy Director of the Becker Friedman Institute for Research in Economics.

== Early life and education ==
Syverson grew up in Fargo and Grand Forks, North Dakota. He attended the University of North Dakota and earned bachelors degrees in both economics and mechanical engineering. Of the relationship between these fields, he said, “My engineering background definitely spurred my research interest in productivity. I like to visit factories and investigate how things are put together, what can go wrong when they are, and what factors influence companies’ operating success.”

Syverson earned a Ph.D. in economics at the University of Maryland in 2001. One advisor was John Haltiwanger, with whom he continued to coauthor.

== Career ==
Syverson began as an assistant professor of economics at the University of Chicago in 2001, and has remained there. He joined the Chicago Booth business school faculty as well, in 2008. He was appointed to a series of named chairs at the university: the J. Baum Harris Professor of Economics] from 2013-18, the Eli B. and Harriet B. Williams Professor of Economics from 2018-20, and since 2020 has been the George C. Tiao Distinguished Service Professor of Economics at the Chicago Booth School of Business. In 2025, Syverson also became the Deputy Director of Chicago's Becker Friedman Institute for Economics.

Syverson has been an editor of several academic journals, including the Journal of Political Economy, The RAND Journal of Economics, and the Journal of Industrial Economics.

He also coauthored with Austan Goolsbee and Steven Levitt Levitt a college textbook, Microeconomics, first published in 2013 and now in its fourth edition.

Syverson's research was recognized with the Distinguished Fellow Award of the Industrial Organization Society in 2025.

== Research ==
Syverson's academic research is empirical and generally focuses on industrial organization and U.S. productivity, and productivity measurement.
