= Erika McEntarfer =

American labor economist (born 1973)

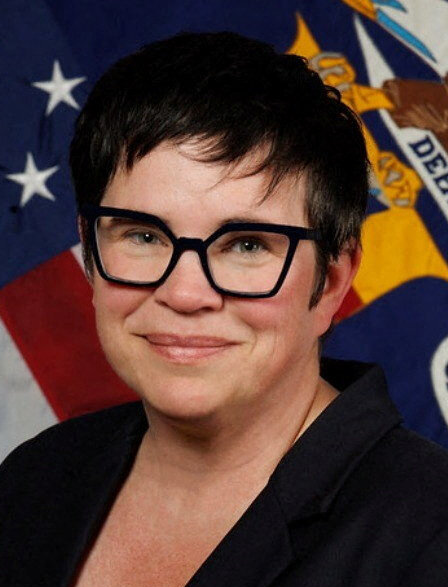
- Official portrait, 2024

16th Commissioner of Labor Statistics
- In office January 29, 2024 – August 1, 2025
- President: Joe Biden; Donald Trump
- Preceded by: William Beach
- Succeeded by: Brett Matsumoto

Personal details
- Born: Erika Lee McEntarfer; January 1973 (age 53)
- Education: Bard College (BA); Virginia Tech (PhD)

Erika Lee McEntarfer (born January 1973) is an American labor economist who served as the commissioner of labor statistics from 2024 to 2025.

McEntarfer graduated from Bard College with a bachelor's degree in social science and from Virginia Tech with a doctorate in economics. She worked in the United States Department of the Treasury's Office of Tax Policy before becoming an economist in the Census Bureau's Center for Economic Studies. In the Biden administration, McEntarfer was a senior economist in the Council of Economic Advisers.

In July 2023, President Joe Biden nominated McEntarfer to serve as Commissioner of Labor Statistics at the Bureau of Labor Statistics. She was confirmed by the Senate in January 2024. On August 1, 2025, President Donald Trump controversially fired McEntarfer as commissioner, hours after a weak jobs report from the Bureau. Without evidence, Trump said McEntarfer had manipulated the jobs numbers, an allegation dismissed by economists. The firing was condemned by economists who saw it as politicizing national statistics and undermining trustworthiness of government data produced under the Trump administration. A 2026 NBER paper estimated that Trump's firing of McEntarfer cost the US economy $20 billion by creating economic policy uncertainty and undermining trust in official statistics, altering behaviors by investors, businesses, and households.

== Early life and education ==
McEntarfer was born in January 1973. She graduated from Bard College with a bachelor's degree in social science and from Virginia Tech with a PhD in economics.

== Career ==
=== Early work in the Federal government ===
From 2002–2008, McEntarfer worked as an economist at the Census Bureau's Longitudinal Employer–Household Dynamics Program; from 2018–2019 she was head of research for the program. From 2010, she was a lead Labor Markets economist in the Census Bureau's Center for Economic Studies. In periods when she was away from the Census Bureau, McEntarfer had been on the economic staff of the Treasury Department's Office of Tax Policy in 2008–2010, and immediately before her appointment to the BLS had been on the nonpolitical staff of the White House Council of Economic Advisers for a year.

=== Commissioner of Labor Statistics (2024–2025) ===
In July 2023, President Joe Biden nominated McEntarfer to serve as Commissioner of Labor Statistics at the Bureau of Labor Statistics (BLS). She was confirmed by the Senate Committee on Health, Education, Labor and Pensions in October 2023, and by the full United States Senate on an 86–8 vote in January 2024.

As commissioner, McEntarfer moved to reduce the sample size of the household survey in the monthly jobs report by five thousand households due to budget constraints. After the Department of Labor determined that the Bureau of Labor Statistics was "not sufficiently focused" on its process to disseminate sensitive economic information, she led the Bureau's response to follow the department's review.

==== Firing by Donald Trump ====
Trump fired McEntarfer soon after a downward revision to the July 2025 employment statistic, but subsequent months showed no net improvement over July's number.

On August 1, 2025, President Donald Trump announced that he had directed his staff to fire McEntarfer, hours after the Bureau's July jobs report, which included a substantial downward revision of reported job creation from the prior two months and weaker-than-expected job creation for July. In a post on Truth Social, Trump accused McEntarfer, without evidence (according to the Financial Times), of incompetence and of having an ulterior motive for allegedly altering employment figures in order to discredit him and Republicans, and to help Democratic nominee Kamala Harris in the 2024 United States presidential election. McEntarfer received notice of her firing hours later.

Trump's assertion that McEntarfer had manipulated the jobs numbers was without evidence and dismissed by economists.

==== Criticism of firing ====
The firing drew widespread criticism from former and current economists, including McEntarfer's predecessor as BLS commissioner, economist William Beach, who called the firing "totally groundless". According to economists, the firing of statisticians for publishing inconvenient data and replacing them with loyalists who might manipulate data served to politicize national statistics and undermine their trustworthiness, which would have adverse economic consequences. In an interview with Kasie Hunt on the Sunday talk show State of the Union, Beach said:

The commissioner doesn't do anything to collect the numbers. The commissioner doesn't see the numbers for until Wednesday before they're published. By the time the commissioner sees the numbers, they're all prepared.

Jed Kolko, a senior fellow at the Peterson Institute for International Economics, said the firing was a "five-alarm intentional harm to the integrity of US economic data and the entire statistical system." In an editorial, The Wall Street Journal commented that "Mr. Trump's data denial is one more reason fewer Americans will trust the government." Commentators pointed out that, with BLS security precautions, the commissioner does not have access to the systems that collect the data for these reports and could not alter the results without a large number of people knowing and possibly complaining publicly. A 2026 NBER paper estimated that McEntarfer's firing harmed the US economy to the tune of approximately $20 billion by introducing economic policy uncertainty and undermining the integrity and quality of official statistics, leading to shifting behaviors by investors, households, and businesses. McEntarfer herself stated that BLS data should still be trusted even despite her firing, as the same agency staff were still running the bureau and are "blowing a loud whistle if there is interference."

==== New nominee for commissioner of labor of statistics position ====
The Bureau's deputy commissioner, William Wiatrowski, was named as McEntarfer's acting successor. On August 11, Trump nominated E.J. Antoni to replace McEntarfer as commissioner. In contrast to McEntarfer, Antoni had no experience in government, no substantive academic work, and a track record of echoing Trump rhetoric and lauding Trump, including having a since-deleted homophobic and misogynist Twitter account. After criticism of Antoni's nomination and Twitter account, Trump withdrew the nomination in September. Wiatrowski continued to serve as interim commissioner as of February 2026.

== Post‑government career ==
Following her dismissal as Commissioner of the Bureau of Labor Statistics in August 2025, McEntarfer joined the Stanford Institute for Economic Policy Research as a Research Scholar and Distinguished Policy Fellow, focusing on labor economics, economic policy, and the interpretation of government data.

She has delivered public lectures and participated in academic events emphasizing the importance of independent and credible economic statistics, including talks at her alma mater, Bard College, on the role of official data in evaluating economic conditions.

McEntarfer has also provided commentary in the media on the risks of politicizing labor statistics and the need to maintain the integrity of federal statistical agencies, warning that interference in data reporting could undermine public trust in economic information.
