= Clifford Ando =

American classicist (born 1969)

Clifford Ando (born 1969) is an American classicist who specializes in Roman law and religion. He is currently the Robert O. Anderson Distinguished Service Professor of Classics, History and the College, at the University of Chicago. He also served as Chair of the Classics Department from 2017-2024.

His work deals primarily with law, religion, and government in the Imperial era, particularly issues of Roman citizenship, legal pluralism, and legal procedure. In the history of law, his work addresses the relations among civil law, public law, and international law.

Ando is also a research fellow in the Department of Classics and World Languages at the University of South Africa, and the recipient of several fellowships, grants, and prizes. He has held fellowship and visiting professorships in Canada, France, Germany, New Zealand, and South Africa. He earned his bachelor's degree from Princeton University in 1990, and his doctorate from the University of Michigan in 1996.

In 2008, he was among faculty members who questioned the establishment of the Milton Friedman Institute at the University of Chicago. More recently, Ando has been critical of the University's fiscal management, charging that university administrators have sacrificed the historic values, teaching quality, and commitment to the humanities that once defined the University.

== Major works ==
- Imperial Ideology and Provincial Loyalty in the Roman Empire (2000), winner of the 2003 Goodwin Award from the American Philological Association
- Editor, Roman Religion (2003)
- Co-editor with Jörg Rüpke, Religion and Law in Classical and Christian Rome (2006)
- The Matter of the Gods (2008)
- Law, Language and Empire in the Roman Tradition (2011)
- Le Droit et l'Empire. Invention juridique et réalités politiques à Rome (2012)
- Imperial Rome: The Critical Century (A.D. 193–284) (2012)
- Religion et gouvernement dans l'Empire romain (2012)
- Roman Social Imaginaries. Language and thought in contexts of empire (2015)

Ando has also published numerous articles, essays, and reviews.
