= Robert S. Haltiwanger =

- Citizenship: United States
- Education: Duke University
- Known for: Glycobiology, O-fucose & O-glucose Modifications
- Relatives: Kathryn H. Schmitz (sister); John Haltiwanger (brother)
- Awards: 2015 Karl Meyer Lectureship Award (Society for Glycobiology)
- Scientific career
- Fields: Glycobiology, Mass Spectrometry, Biochemistry, Biology
- Workplaces: Johns Hopkins University, Stony Brook University, University of Georgia
- Doctoral advisor: Robert L. Hill (biochemist)

Robert S. Haltiwanger is professor and Georgia Research Alliance Eminent Scholar in Biomedical Glycoscience at the Complex Carbohydrate Research Center at the University of Georgia. He was previously professor and chair of The Department of Biochemistry and Cellular Biology at Stony Brook University. Haltiwanger received his Bachelor of Science from Duke University and then his doctorate from the same institution under Robert L. Hill. His post-doctoral work was at Johns Hopkins University under Gerald Hart. His primary field of interest is glycobiology with a focus on O-fucose and O-glucose glycans, NOTCH receptor signaling, and related projects.
