= William Beach (economist) =

American government official

Bill Beach
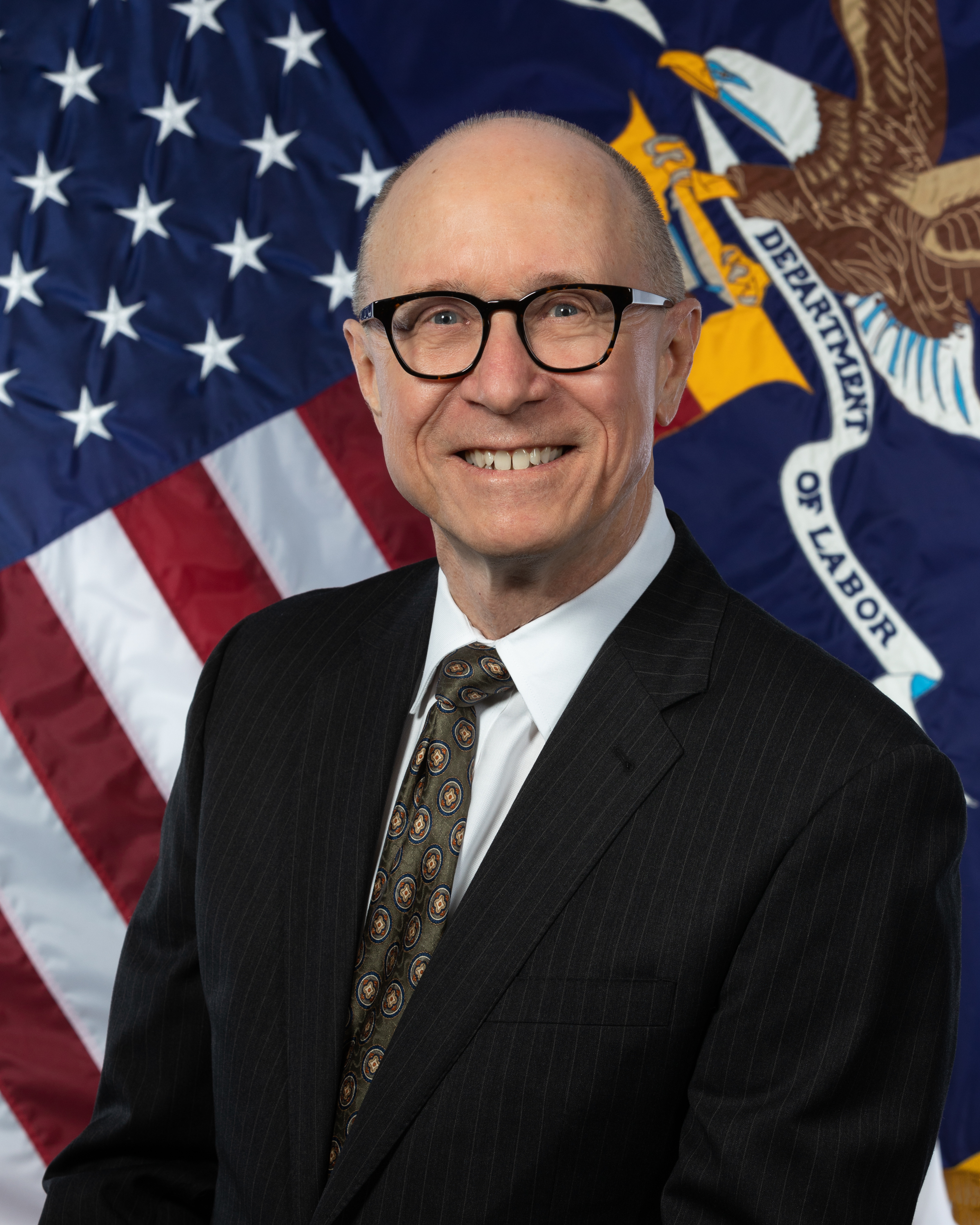

Commissioner of Labor Statistics
- In office March 28, 2019 – March 27, 2023
- President: Donald Trump; Joe Biden
- Preceded by: Erica Groshen
- Succeeded by: Erika McEntarfer

Personal details
- Education: Washburn University (BA); University of Missouri (MA); Buckingham University (PhD)

William W. Beach is the former Commissioner of Labor Statistics and head of the U.S. Bureau of Labor Statistics (BLS), an independent U.S. government fact-finding agency focused on labor economics and statistics, inflation, and productivity.

Beach was nominated for the position in October 2017 and confirmed by the U.S. Senate on March 13, 2019, to serve a four-year term.

== Education ==
Beach holds a BA degree from Washburn University, a master's degree from the University of Missouri in Columbia, Missouri and a PhD in economics from the University of Buckingham.

== Career ==
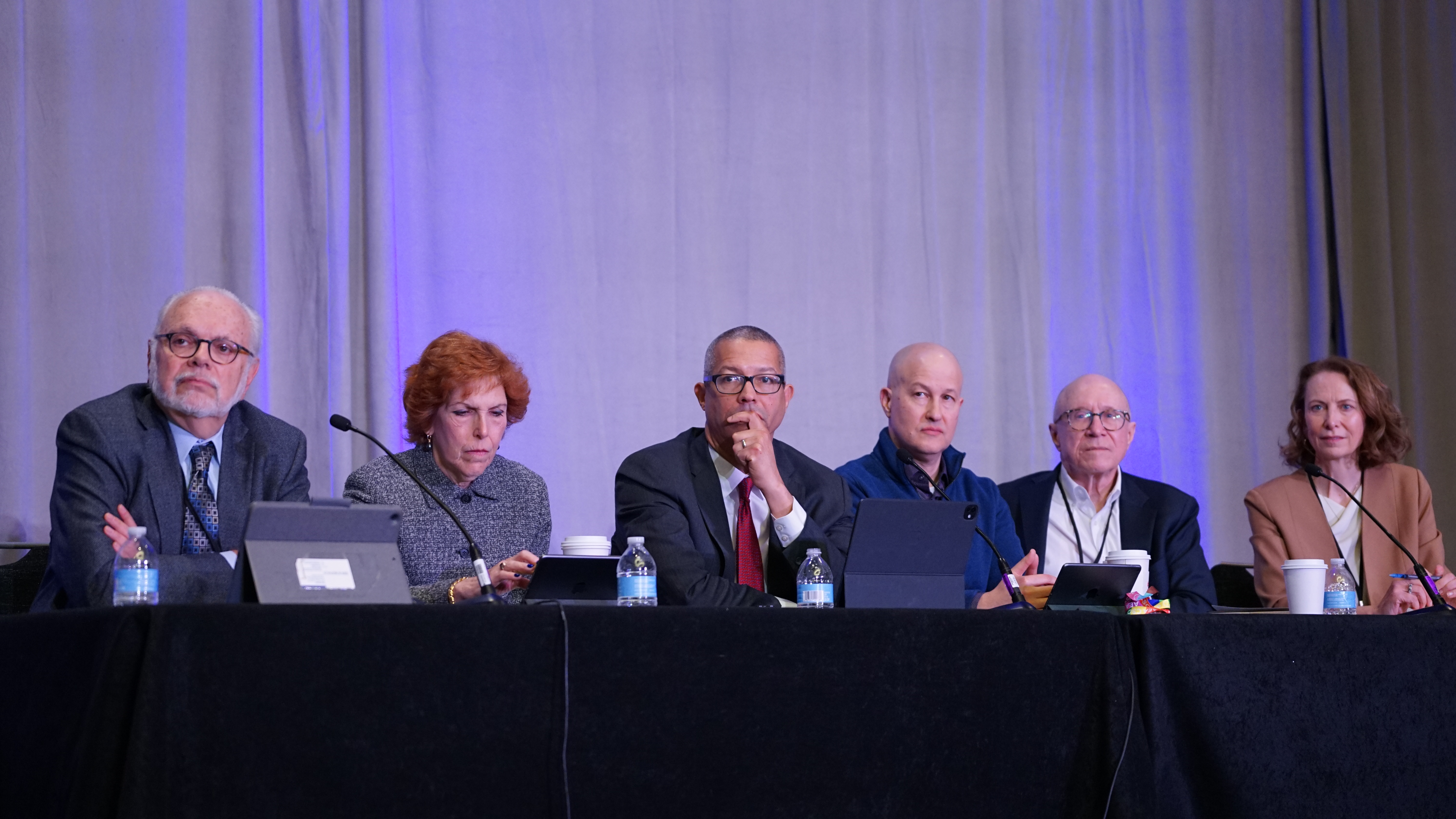
David Wessel, Loretta Mester, Seth Carpenter, Jed Kolko, Beach, Karen Dynan at ASSA 2026

Beach was previously Vice President for Policy Research at the Mercatus Center of George Mason University, Chief Economist for the Senate Budget Committee, Republican Staff, and Lazof Family Fellow in Economics at The Heritage Foundation and director of the Foundation's Center for Data Analysis.

=== Selected works ===
- Beach, William W., and Tim Kane. "Methodology: Measuring the 10 economic freedoms." 2008 Index of economic freedom (2008): 39–55.
- Beach, William W., and Marc A. Miles. "Explaining the factors of the index of economic freedom." 2006 Index of Economic Freedom (2006): 55–76.
- Beach, William W., and Gareth G. Davis. Social Security's rate of return. Heritage Foundation, 1998.
- Beach, William W., Aaron B. Schavey, and Isabel M. Isidro. How Realiable are IMF Economic Forecasts?. Heritage Foundation, 1999.
- Butler, Stuart M., William W. Beach, and Paul L. Winfree. Pathways to economic mobility: Key indicators. Economic mobility project, 2008.
