= John Haltiwanger =

American economist (born 1955)

John C. Haltiwanger
- Born: December 12, 1955 (age 70)
- Known for: longitudinal firm-level microdata
- Spouse: Lucia Foster
- Relatives: Kathryn H. Schmitz (sister); Robert S. Haltiwanger (brother)

Academic background
- Education: Johns Hopkins University; Brown University

Academic work
- Institutions: University of Maryland-College Park
- Doctoral students: Chad Syverson

John Couch Haltiwanger (born December 12, 1955) is an American economist who has served since 2013 as the Dudley and Louisa Dillard Professor of Economics Economics at the University of Maryland, College Park. He is best known for his work developing and studying longitudinal firm-level microdata, which formed the foundation of his influential work on the determinants of firm-level job creation, job destruction, and economic performance.

== Biography ==
Haltiwanger received a B.S. in applied mathematics and economics from Brown University in 1977 and a Ph.D. in economics from Johns Hopkins University in 1981.

Prior to arriving at the University of Maryland-College Park in 1987, he held positions on the faculty at the University of California-Los Angeles and The Johns Hopkins University. He is also a research associate at the Center for Economic Studies at the U.S. Bureau of the Census, and served as Chief Economist of the U.S. Bureau of the Census between 1997 and 1999.

In addition these positions, Haltiwanger is a senior research fellow of the Census Bureau's Longitudinal Employer-Household Dynamics (LEHD) Program, which he helped to found along with John M. Abowd and Julia Lane. He is a member of the Federal Economics Statistics Advisory Council and a research associate at both the Institute for the Study of Labor (IZA) and the National Bureau of Economic Research (NBER).

Haltiwanger served as chief economist of the U.S. Bureau of the Census between 1997 and 1999. He was also previously a member of the Committee on National Statistics for the National Academy of Sciences, a consultant for the Conference Board, and a member of the Brookings Panel on Economic Activity. He was elected a Fellow of the Econometric Society in 2016, and was elected to the American Academy of Arts and Sciences in 2025.

He is married to Lucia Foster.

== Work ==
Haltiwanger is known for his influential work using firm-level longitudinal data to explore the dynamics of job creation, job destruction, and economic performance. In his 1996 book Job Creation and Destruction (co-authored with Steven Davis and Scott Schuh), he uses plant-level data from the manufacturing industry to examine how businesses and workers respond to changes in their economic environments. Among the most striking findings in the book are the large and persistent gross job flows, which dwarf the net job flows that are commonly observed in employment data. Job Creation and Destruction laid the groundwork for subsequent research that not only confirmed the existence of such large gross job flows in other time periods, sectors, and countries, but also delved into the mechanisms and theories that would explain these flows.

In a review published in the Journal of Economic Literature in 1997, David Blanchflower concluded that Job Creation and Destruction "is an important piece of work. Not many books start literatures. This one is likely to. Buy it." (page 1400). In a review published in Economica in 1998, Jonathan Haskel noted that Job Creation and Destruction "is a definitive documentation of job creation and destruction in the United States and has already proved to be the starting point for a rich body of work. How many other books can claim to be so influential in their field?" (page 156). Job Creation and Destruction was a Choice Outstanding Academic Title in 1996.

More recently, Haltiwanger has empirically explored the basis for the conventional view that small firms are responsible for the majority of growth in the U.S. economy. His research on the subject suggests that it is young firms, not small firms per se, that create the disproportionate number of jobs.

Haltiwanger has also published widely cited articles in the Quarterly Journal of Economics, the American Economic Review, the Review of Economic Studies, the Review of Economics and Statistics, the Journal of Economic Literature, and other major economics and statistics journals.

== Honors and awards ==
- 2014 Roger Herriot Award (with John Abowd and Julia Lane)
- 2013 Julius Shiskin Memorial Award
- Choice Outstanding Academic Title (1996), Job Creation and Destruction (co-authored with Steven Davis and Scott Schuh)
- Choice Outstanding Academic Title (2007), Economic Turbulence: Is A Volatile Economy Good for America? (co-authored with Clair Brown and Julia Lane)
- 2020 Global Award for Entrepreneurship Research

== Selected works ==
=== Books ===
- Davis, S., J. Haltiwanger, and S. Schuh. 1996. Job Creation and Destruction. Cambridge: MIT Press.
- Brown, C., J. Haltiwanger, and J. Lane. 2006. Economic Turbulence: Is A Volatile Economy Good for America? Chicago: University of Chicago Press.
