= Kathryn H. Schmitz =

American exercise physiologist

- Relatives: John Haltiwanger (brother); Robert S. Haltiwanger (brother)

Academic background
- Education: BA, Economics, 1984, University of North Carolina; MSEd, Exercise Physiology, Queens College, City University of New York; PhD, 1998, MPH, 1999, University of Minnesota

Mary Kathryn "Katie" Haltiwanger Schmitz is an American exercise physiologist. She is the Associate Director of Population Sciences at Penn State University College of Medicine and a Full Professor at the Perelman School of Medicine at the University of Pennsylvania.

== Early life and education ==
Growing up in New York, Schmitz was a dancer with the Martha Graham Dance Ensemble and a personal trainer and manager of the Salomon Brothers executive fitness center. While working at the fitness center, Schmitz realized she was often unable to answer clients questions due to a lack of knowledge. As a result, Schmitz decided to earn a master's degree in exercise science from Queens College, City University of New York and an MPH and doctorate in exercise physiology from the University of Minnesota.

== Career ==
Upon receiving her PhD, Schmitz joined the University of Minnesota's School of Public Health faculty before accepting a position at the University of Pennsylvania (UPenn). She later recalled that she chose to switch institutions for family reasons. While at the University of Minnesota, Schmitz conducted a small scale study on women with or without lymphedema and strength training. The results found that lymphedema symptoms got better in women who did strength training, as well as improved their strength, body fat percentage, and their quality of life. Importantly, contrary to clinical guidelines at the time, the slowly progressive resistance training program did not result in any onset or worsening of breast cancer related lymphedema. As an assistant professor of epidemiology at the University of Pennsylvania, Schmitz's research continued to focus on understanding the connection between physical activity and cancer. In 2007, she published results of the SHE study, which demonstrated that twice weekly supervised strength training over two years on attenuated visceral fat gains among midlife overweight and obese women. Her research began to gain more attraction when she published her randomized trial of weight lifting for breast cancer survivors. Results from this trial reversed prior clinical guidelines from the American Cancer Society, Susan G Komen Foundation, and the National Cancer Institute, which all guided women to avoid lifting anything heavier than 5-15 pounds ever again after breast cancer, to avoid onset or worsening of lymphedema. The trial demonstrated no risk for women at risk and a reduction of worsening of lymphedema among women already diagnosed with the condition. Her research was recognized by the National Lymphedema Network with the awarding of the Catalyst Award for "being a researcher whose work has stimulated thought, discussion, and debate that leads to improvement in patient care for those with lymphedema."

As an associate professor in the department of biostatistics and epidemiology at UPenn, she was appointed the lead author of the first American College of Sports Medicine Roundtable on Exercise for Cancer Survivors, which published the first guidelines for exercise testing and prescription for cancer survivors.

In 2011, the National Cancer Institute granted Dr. Schmitz, then an associate professor at the Perelman School of Medicine, a $10 million grant to establish a new center focusing on the relationship between exercise, weight loss, and improving the length and quality of life. Schmitz was the principal investigator of the center, called the Penn TREC Survivor Center, as well as the leader of one trial in the center which focused on examining the relationship between lymphedema and weight loss in overweight breast cancer survivors. She became a full professor at UPenn in 2013. In 2016, she transferred her Transdisciplinary Research on Energetics and Cancer (TREC) Center grant to the Penn State University and became the associate director of population sciences. In 2017, Schmitz became the president-elect of the American College of Sports Medicine (ACSM). She served the 50,000 member organization as president-elect, president, and then immediate past-president from 2017-2020.

While she served as president of ACSM, Dr. Schmitz started an initiative called Moving Through Cancer, which has a bold goal of making exercise standard of care in the setting of oncology by 2029. The Moving Through Cancer task force, made up of oncology clinicians, behavioral scientists, implementation scientists, physical therapists, and exercise scientists, contributed to updates of the National Accreditation Program for Breast Centers standards, adding exercise recommendations for breast cancer patients. The task force focuses on workforce development, program development, stakeholder awareness, policy, and research. Taskforce members updated the ACSM/American Cancer Society credential for exercise professionals to be prepared to meet the needs of people living with and beyond cancer. The task force has developed a free online registry of over 2300 exercise oncology and oncology rehabilitation programs across the U.S. and abroad that is searchable. The registry includes a triage tool that recommends programming appropriate for a given survivor’s needs. The task force has also developed a stakeholder awareness brochure that is freely available and written at a low literacy level. It is also available in Spanish. Policy efforts have included presenting information to the Centers for Medicare and Medicaid Services to advocate for coverage of exercise oncology programming and presenting information to American College of Surgeons Commission on Cancer to advocate for exercise oncology standards.

In 2017, she was nominated for Penn State's Innovator of the Year Award. While she was serving as associate director, Schmitz co-developed updated ACSM guidelines and exercise recommendations for people living with cancer or survivors of the disease. In 2022, she received the prestigious award of American Cancer Society Clinical Research Professor in recognition of her contributions to the field of exercise oncology.

In 2022, Dr. Schmitz moved her laboratory to the University of Pittsburgh and the UPMC Hillman Cancer Center. At that time, she started three large exercise oncology trials funded by the National Cancer Institute, each of which is ongoing as of this writing, including: PA Moves, which aims to increase physical activity among rural Pennsylvanians for cancer prevention; Nurse AMIE, which aims to improve overall survival among rural advanced cancer patients with a tablet based supportive care intervention; and THRIVE-65, which aims to improve chemotherapy completion rates among older breast cancer patients receiving chemotherapy. She is an elected fellow of The Obesity Society, ACSM, National Academy of Kinesiology, the Society of Behavioral Medicine, and the Royal College of Surgeons Faculty of Sports and Exercise Medicine. She is the winner of numerous awards, including the Citation Award from ACSM, the Trish Greene Award for Quality of Life from the American Cancer Society, and the Presidential Council on Sports, Fitness, and Nutrition Lifetime Impact Award. She served as Associate Director of Population Science for UPMC Hillman Cancer Center from 2023–present. In January 2025, she was named Interim Director of UPMC Hillman Cancer Center, a position she filled through the end of October 2025. As of November 1, 2025, she has been named Deputy Director of UPMC Hillman Cancer Center. She is the founding president of the International Society of Exercise Oncology.
