= Robert L. Hill (biochemist) =

- Born: 1928; Kansas City, Missouri
- Died: November 29, 2012
- Scientific career
- Fields: Biochemistry
- Institutions: Duke University School of Medicine
- Doctoral advisor: Russell Mills
- Doctoral students: Robert S. Haltiwanger

Robert L. Hill (1928-2012) was a biochemist who spent most of his career on the faculty at Duke University School of Medicine, from which he retired as the James B. Duke Professor Emeritus. Hill's research focused on the chemistry of enzymes, with particular specialization in glycosyltransferases and glycobiology.

Hill was elected to the American Academy of Arts and Sciences in 1974, the National Academy of Sciences in 1975, the Institute of Medicine in 1978. He served on the editorial board of the scientific journal Journal of Biological Chemistry beginning in 1965 and as associate editor from 1988 to 2012, where he initiated a regular feature series called "Classics" in which the journal reprinted selected papers of high historical significance. Hill died on November 29, 2012.

== Early life and education ==
Hill was born in Kansas City, Missouri in 1928. He was an undergraduate at the University of Kansas and received a B.S. in chemistry in 1949. He remained there for graduate work under the supervision of Russell Mills, and received his Ph.D. in 1954. He then worked as a postdoctoral fellow at the University of Utah with Emil L. Smith.

== Academic career ==
Hill joined the faculty at the University of Utah in 1956. Philip Handler, then chair of the biochemistry department at Duke University School of Medicine, recruited Hill to move to Duke. Hill moved in 1961 and remained at Duke for the rest of his career. He was named to the James B. Duke professorship in 1965 and served as department chair from 1969 to 1993, succeeding Handler after the latter assumed the presidency of the National Academy of Sciences.

Hill was active in service and leadership roles in scientific societies, particularly the American Society for Biochemistry and Molecular Biology, of which he was president in 1976. He served on the editorial boards of several journals and had a particularly long association with the Journal of Biological Chemistry. He joined the editorial board in 1965 and became associate editor in 1988, a role he kept after his retirement from Duke and until shortly before his death in 2012. At JBC he initiated and co-curated the JBC Classics series, which reprinted papers from the journal archives of particularly high scientific impact. Along with Smith and Handler, Hill co-edited a foundational textbook in biochemistry from 1968 to 1978.

== Research ==
Hill developed an interest in protein chemistry during his postdoctoral work and became known for his studies of hemoglobin while at Utah. He made major contributions to the study of immunoglobulin structure and was particularly influential in the field of glycobiology, which became a major focus of his work after he and collaborating scientists discovered that lactose synthetase contains a glycosyltransferase enzyme.

== Awards and honors ==
- Elected to the American Academy of Arts and Sciences, 1974
- Elected to the National Academy of Sciences, 1975
- Elected to the Institute of Medicine, 1978
- Received the North Carolina Gold Medal in 1985
- Received the American Society for Biochemistry and Molecular Biology's William C. Rose Award, 2001
- Received the Society for Glycobiology's Karl Meyer Award, 2001
