= Lucia Foster =

American economist

- Born: Lucia Smith Foster
- Education: Georgetown University (B.A.), University of Maryland (Ph.D)
- Occupation: Economist
- Known for: Chief Economist, U.S. Census Bureau
- Spouse: John Haltiwanger

Lucia Smith Foster is the Chief of the Center for Economic Studies (CES) and the Chief Economist at the U.S Census Bureau in Washington, D.C.

== Biography ==
Foster received a B.A. in economics from Georgetown University in 1983 and a Ph.D. in economics from the University of Maryland in 1988.

Foster worked as a research assistant at the Congressional Budget Office between 1983 and 1986, working on forecasts of the U.S. economy, and as an assistant economist at the Federal Reserve Board during the years 1986–1990, working primarily on forecasts of U.S. international trade. Between 1986 and 1990, she worked at the Federal Reserve Board as an Assistant Economist working primarily on the forecast of U.S. international trade. Foster joined the Census Bureau as a research assistant in the Center for Economic Studies (CES) while she was completing her Ph.D. at the University of Maryland. She joined CES full time in 1998 after completion of her studies. In 2008, she became the CES Director of Research. She has served as the Chief Economist of the U.S. Census Bureau and Chief of the Center for Economic Studies (CES) since 2011.

She is married to John Haltiwanger.

== Work ==
As Chief Economist of the U.S. Census Bureau, Foster is responsible for identifying gaps in understanding of the U.S. economy and developing new data products, as well as improving and enhancing existing data production, in collaboration with Census Bureau staff and external experts.

In her research, Foster uses Census microdata to research firm dynamics, productivity, and management practices. Foster and a team of other researchers proposed and established the Annual Survey of Entrepreneurs, first fielded in 2014. Foster was instrumental to the effort to have the Management and Organizational Practices Survey (MOPS) added as a supplement to the Annual Survey of Manufactures. She is one of the key Census Bureau members of the Collaborative Micro-Productivity Project, a joint project with the Bureau of Labor Statistics, which has created the public use dataset Dispersion Statistics on Productivity (DiSP)

== Honors and awards ==
Commerce Department Gold Medal for Leadership

2016 Bronze Medal Award for Superior Federal Service – Annual Survey of Entrepreneurs

2010 Bronze Medal Award for Superior Federal Service – Decennial Analysis Team

== Selected publications ==
- Foster, Lucia, John C. Haltiwanger, and Chad Syverson. 2016. "The Slow Growth of New Plants: Learning About Demand?" Economica, 83, 91–129.
- Foster, Lucia and Patrice Norman. 2015. "The Annual Survey of Entrepreneurs: An Introduction." CES Working Paper.
- Foster, Lucia, Cheryl Grim, and John Haltiwanger. 2016. "Reallocation in the Great Recession: Cleansing or Not?" Journal of Labor Economics, 34(S1): S293-S331. DOI:10.1086/682397 .
- Foster, Lucia, Cheryl Grim, and John Haltiwanger. 2014. "Reallocation in the Great Recession: Cleansing or Not?" NBER Working Paper, No. 20427 (Prior version Center for Economic Studies Discussion Paper, 13–42).
- Foster, Lucia, John C. Haltiwanger, Shawn D. Klimek, C.J. Krizan, and Scott Ohlmacher. 2016. "The Evolution of National Retail Chains: How We Got Here." In Handbook on the Economics of Retailing and Distribution, ed. Emek Basker (ed.), 7-37.
- Buffington, Cathy, Lucia Foster, Ron Jarmin, and Scott Ohlmacher. 2016. "The Management and Organizational Practices Survey (MOPS): An Overview." Journal of Economic and Social Measurement, 42(1).
- Bloom, Nick, Erik Brynjolfsson, Lucia Foster, Ron Jarmin, and Itay Saporta-Eksten. 2013. "Management in America." Center for Economic Studies Working Paper, No. 13-01.
- Foster, Lucia, Cheryl Grim, and John Haltiwanger. 2013. "Reallocation in the Great Recession: Cleansing or Not?" Center for Economic Studies Discussion Paper Series, No. 13-42.
- Foster, Lucia, John Haltiwanger, and Chad Syverson. 2012. "The Slow Growth of New Plants: Learning about Demand?" Center for Economic Studies Working Paper, No. 12-06.
- Foster, Lucia and Cheryl Grim. 2010. "Characteristics of the Top R&D Performing Firms in the U.S.: Evidence from the Survey of Industrial R&D." Center for Economic Studies Discussion Paper, 10–33.
- Foster, Lucia, Ron Jarmin, and Lynn Riggs. 2010. "Resolving the Tension between Access and Confidentiality: Past Experience and Future Plans at the U.S. Census Bureau." Statistical Journal of the IAOS: Journal of the International Association for Official Statistics, Vol. 26 (3–4).
- Foster, Lucia, John Haltiwanger, and Chad Syverson. 2008. "Reallocation, Firm Turnover, and Efficiency: Selection on Productivity or Profitability?" American Economic Review, No. 98(1), 394–425.
- Foster, Lucia, C.J. Krizan, Kristin Fairman, and Ian Rucker. 2008. "An Analysis of Key Difference in Micro Data: Results from the Business List Comparison Project." American Statistical Association, Business and Economics Statistics Section (CD-ROM).
- Foster, Lucia, John Haltiwanger, and Namsuk Kim. 2006. "Gross Job Flows for the U.S. Manufacturing Sector, 1973-1998." Center Economic Studies, WP No. 08-28.
- Foster, Lucia, C.J. Krizan, David Talan, and Joel Elvery. 2006. "Preliminary Micro Data Results from the Business List Comparison Project." Proceedings of the American Statical Associations, Business and Economics Statistics Section (CD-ROM).
- Foster, Lucia, C.J. Krizan, and John Haltiwanger. 2006. "Market Selection, Reallocation, and Restructuring in the U.S. Retail Trade Sector in the 1990s." Review of Economics and Statistics, Vol. 88, No. 4, Pages 748–758.
