= The Journal of Industrial Economics =

- Discipline: Industrial economics
- Language: English
- Edited by: Matthew Mitchell

Publication details
- History: 1952–present
- Publisher: Wiley-Blackwell
- Frequency: Quarterly
- Impact factor: 1 (2024)

Standard abbreviations
- ISO 4: J. Ind. Econ.

Indexing
- ISSN: 0022-1821 (print); 1467-6451 (web)
- LCCN: 59031498
- JSTOR: 00221821
- OCLC no.: 924714325

Links
- Journal homepage; Online access; Online archive

The Journal of Industrial Economics is a quarterly peer-reviewed academic journal on industrial economics topics. It was established in 1952 to advance the analysis of modern industrial economics so the focus is on topics related to oligopoly theory, product differentiation, industrial structural change, corporate theory, market regulation, monopoly theory, mergers and acquisitions and technology policy. According to the Journal Citation Reports, the journal has a 2024 impact factor of 1.

== Editors ==
The editor-in-chief is Matthew Mitchell (University of Toronto).

== See also ==
- List of economics journals
