= Jed Kolko =

American economist

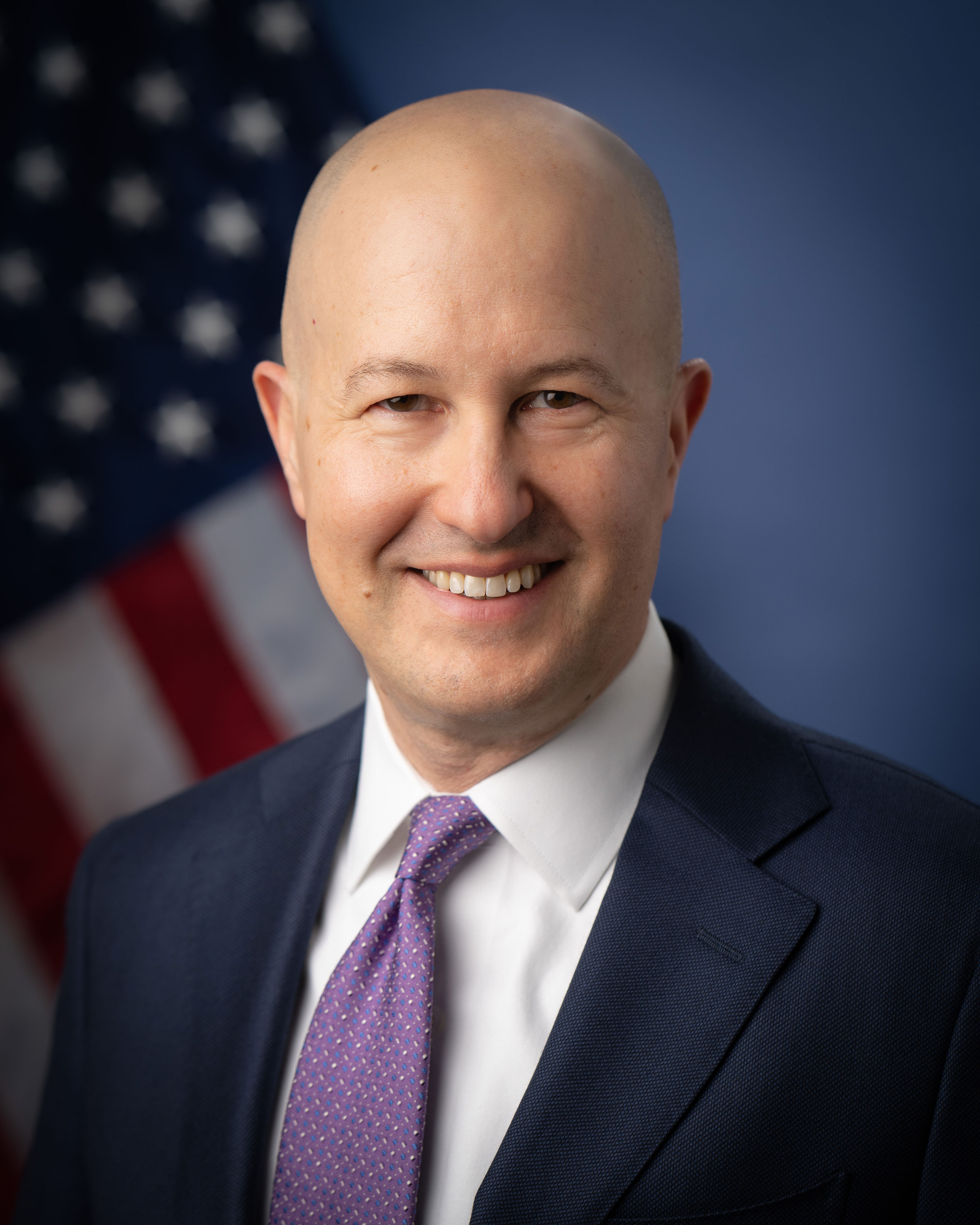

Under Secretary of Commerce for Economic Affairs
- In office April 19, 2022 – February 2, 2024
- President: Joe Biden
- Preceded by: Karen Dunn Kelley
- Succeeded by: Joyce Meyer

Personal details
- Born: Jed David Kolko
- Spouse: Eric Rice (m. 2008)
- Education: Harvard University (AB, PhD)

Jed David Kolko is an American economist who served as the Under Secretary of Commerce for Economic Affairs in the Biden administration.

== Early life and education ==
Kolko was raised in Rochester, New York. He earned a Bachelor of Arts degree in social studies and a PhD in economics from Harvard University.

== Career ==
Kolko began his career as vice president and research director of Forrester Research. From 2006 to 2011, he was the associate director of research at the Public Policy Institute of California. He was the chief economist and vice president of analytics for Trulia from 2011 to 2015, research advisor for Bloomberg Beta from 2015 to 2017, and an advisor at Orbital Insight from 2015 to 2019. Kolko has also been a senior fellow at the University of California, Berkeley Terner Center for Housing Innovation. He worked as the chief economist for Indeed from 2016 to 2022. Kolko has been featured as an economic specialist on NPR, CNN, and MSNBC.

=== Biden administration ===
On September 13, 2021, President Joe Biden nominated Kolko to be Under Secretary of Commerce for Economic Affairs. Hearings were held on Kolko's nomination in the Senate Commerce Committee on December 4, 2021. The committee favorably reported his nomination to the Senate floor on December 15, 2021. Kolko's initial nomination expired at the end of the year and was returned to President Biden on January 3, 2022.

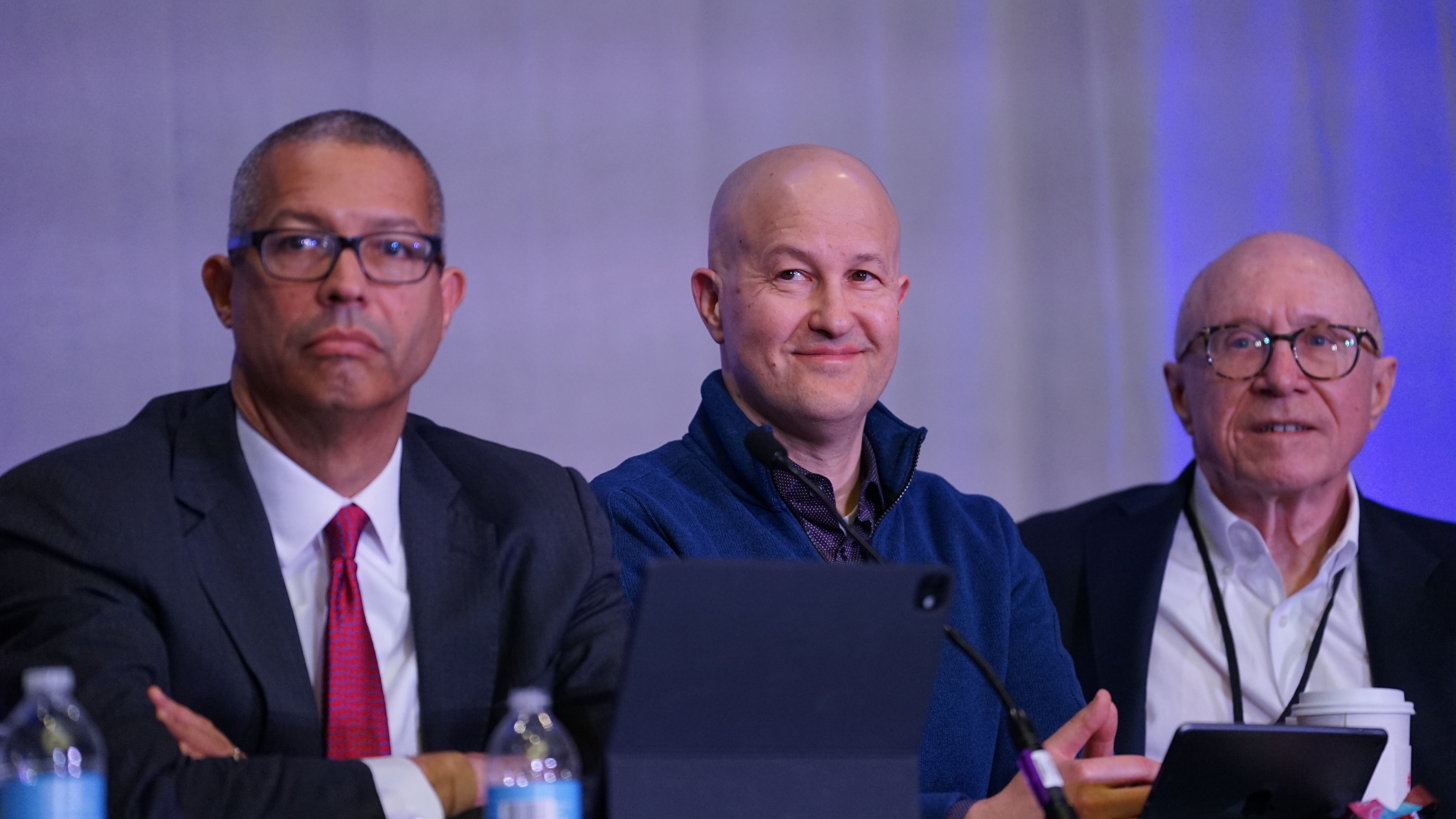
Seth Carpenter, Kolko, William Beach at ASSA 2026

President Biden renominated Kolko the following day. On February 2, 2022, the committee favorably reported his nomination to the Senate floor. His nomination was confirmed by the entire Senate on April 7, 2022, via voice vote. He was sworn in by Secretary of Commerce Gina Raimondo on April 19, 2022.

Kolko resigned from his position in February 2024.

== Personal life ==
Kolko married Eric Rice, also an economist, in 2008. They live in San Francisco.
