= E.J. Antoni =

American economist (born 1987)

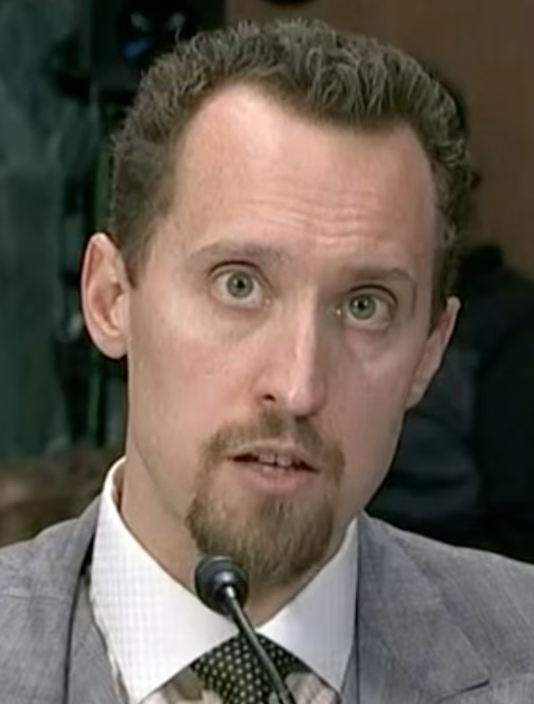
- Antoni in 2023
- Born: Erwin John Antoni III; October 1987 (age 38)
- Education: St. Charles Borromeo Seminary (BA); Northern Illinois University (MA, PhD)

Academic background
- Thesis: Fiscal Triumvirate: Analyses of Crowding Out from Deficit Spending, of Domestic Migration from State Taxes, and of the Irrelevance of Credit Ratings on Municipal Debt Yields (2020)
- Doctoral advisor: Carl Campbell

Academic work
- Discipline: Fiscal policy, labor economics

Erwin John Antoni III (born October 1987) is an American economist. Since May 2025, he is the chief economist for The Heritage Foundation.

Antoni contributed to Project 2025. In August 2025, Donald Trump nominated Antoni as Bureau of Labor Statistics commissioner, after having fired Erika McEntarfer; facing criticism across the political spectrum, he withdrew the nomination in September.

Antoni is a frequent commentator on Fox channels.

== Early life and education ==
Erwin John Antoni III was born in October 1987. He graduated from Lansdale Catholic in 2006, and from St. Charles Borromeo Seminary in 2010 with a Bachelor of Arts. He was enrolled at the seminary until 2012, and after six years of study Antoni left before completing the program, without achieving ordination into the ministerial priesthood. He then graduated from Northern Illinois University with a Master of Arts and later a doctorate in economics in 2020.

== Career ==
Antoni taught college-level courses, worked as an economist at the Texas Public Policy Foundation, and testified before Congress and state legislatures. In 2022, he joined The Heritage Foundation, working as a research fellow. Antoni has also been a senior fellow at the Committee to Unleash Prosperity, co-founded by Stephen Moore. Antoni contributed to Project 2025. He was promoted to chief economist for The Heritage Foundation in May, 2025.

Antoni is a Fox News commentator.

== Commissioner of Labor Statistics nominee ==
In August 2025, president Donald Trump dismissed the Commissioner of Labor Statistics, Erika McEntarfer, hours after the Bureau of Labor Statistics released updated employment figures that suggested a slowing economy. Trump complained about the report's downward revision, which showed job losses and a stalling labor market. Trump alleged that McEntarfer had manipulated the Bureau's data for political purposes. Steve Bannon, a former senior advisor to Trump, suggested that Antoni should be nominated as Commissioner of Labor Statistics. That month, The Wall Street Journal reported that Antoni was among several candidates being interviewed to replace McEntarfer.

On August 11, 2025, Trump named Antoni as his nominee for Commissioner of Labor Statistics. The Wall Street Journal noted that "Past BLS commissioners have had extensive research experience, and many have climbed the ranks of the agency itself. Antoni doesn’t fit that profile." He has not published any formal research papers since his graduation, and Antoni's fiscal policy dissertation that is on file at Northern Illinois University "has earned one citation, by the Texas Public Policy Foundation in 2021, while he worked there", according to reporting by The Wall Street Journal. The National Review has said that "Antoni is nowhere near qualified to be BLS commissioner", suggesting that Trump wants to hire a loyalist for the position, because what "Trump would like is a BLS that is biased in his favor". The New York Times noted that economists from across the political spectrum "found Dr. Antoni's history of distorting economic statistics to support partisan positions" was more concerning than his lack of experience. The Nation has written that "[Antoni's] track record is so alarming that many conservative economists" have denounced the nomination, including Kyle Pomerleau from the American Enterprise Institute, AEI colleague Stan Veuger, and Dave Herbert of the American Institute for Economic Research.

Following Antoni's nomination, images resurfaced of him in attendance at the January 6 United States Capitol attack. The White House described Antoni as a "bystander to the events" and denied that he was involved in anything "inappropriate or illegal." The White House withdrew Antoni's nomination in September 2025; CNN reported that "GOP Sens. Susan Collins and Lisa Murkowski had declined to meet with Antoni, potentially raising concerns that his nomination was in trouble."

== Views ==
In the summer of 2024, during a presentation that he led at the Heritage Foundation, Antoni told interns that "women's IQs generally clustered around average scores, while men's IQs varied more between 'geniuses' and low-intelligence individuals", according to sources who spoke with the Washington Post. Heritage Foundation's vice president, Mary Vought, said that Antoni was referring to a Darwinian concept called the "greater male variability hypothesis".

According to the Washington Post, Antoni "repeatedly referred to Social Security as a 'Ponzi scheme' in a [2024] radio interview". Antoni has also appeared on a podcast in 2024 where he advocated for sunsetting the Social Security program, saying "you'll need a generation of people who pay Social Security taxes but never actually receive any of those benefits". He further stated that "The people who are going to retire 10, 20, even 30, or certainly 40 years from now—I'm sorry, but the program is not going to be viable at that time".

In May 2025, Antoni described the Bureau of Labor Statistics's reports as a "random number generator" and criticized the agency's performance in the Biden administration, describing the agency's numbers as being from "the magical world of make-believe". Appearing on Steve Bannon's podcast, War Room in July, Antoni stated that a commissioner of labor statistics appointed by Trump would result in more accurate information from the bureau. In an interview with Fox Business in August, he suggested that the bureau should report job statistics quarterly instead of monthly, after backing down from previous suggestions to suspend the reports altogether. According to CNN, "In the absence of a monthly jobs report, the Federal Reserve would be missing data to support one half of its dual mandate (price stability and full employment), which in turn would ... thoroughly disrupt businesses' abilities to plan."

Antoni has frequently used a painting of the German warship Bismarck as a background when conducting interviews. He once described the Nazi-era ship, which was sunk by Allied Forces in 1941, as "hard not to love".

On August 18, 2025, Wired first reported that in the months prior to the January 6 United States Capitol attack, Antoni ran a Twitter account under "Dr. Erwin J. Antoni III" that promoted "election denial conspiracy theories while talking about violent threats to those who stood in Trump's way". The account "repeatedly used violent rhetoric to declare how far it was willing to go to ensure Trump secured a second term in office"; one of the final posts made just hours before the assault on the Capitol commenced used "violent religious rhetoric". CNN described the now-deleted Twitter account as having "featured sexually degrading attacks on Kamala Harris, derogatory remarks about gay people, conspiracy theories, and crude insults aimed at critics of President Donald Trump". CNN also reported that Antoni allegedly used "anonymous aliases [which] shared strikingly similar biographical details" and that he left a digital trail on Twitter which "reveals a pattern of incendiary rhetoric that veered frequently into conspiracy theories and misogyny".

== See also ==
- List of contributors to Project 2025
