= Becker Friedman Institute for Research in Economics =

Research center at the University of Chicago

Coordinates: 41°47′24″N 87°35′52″W

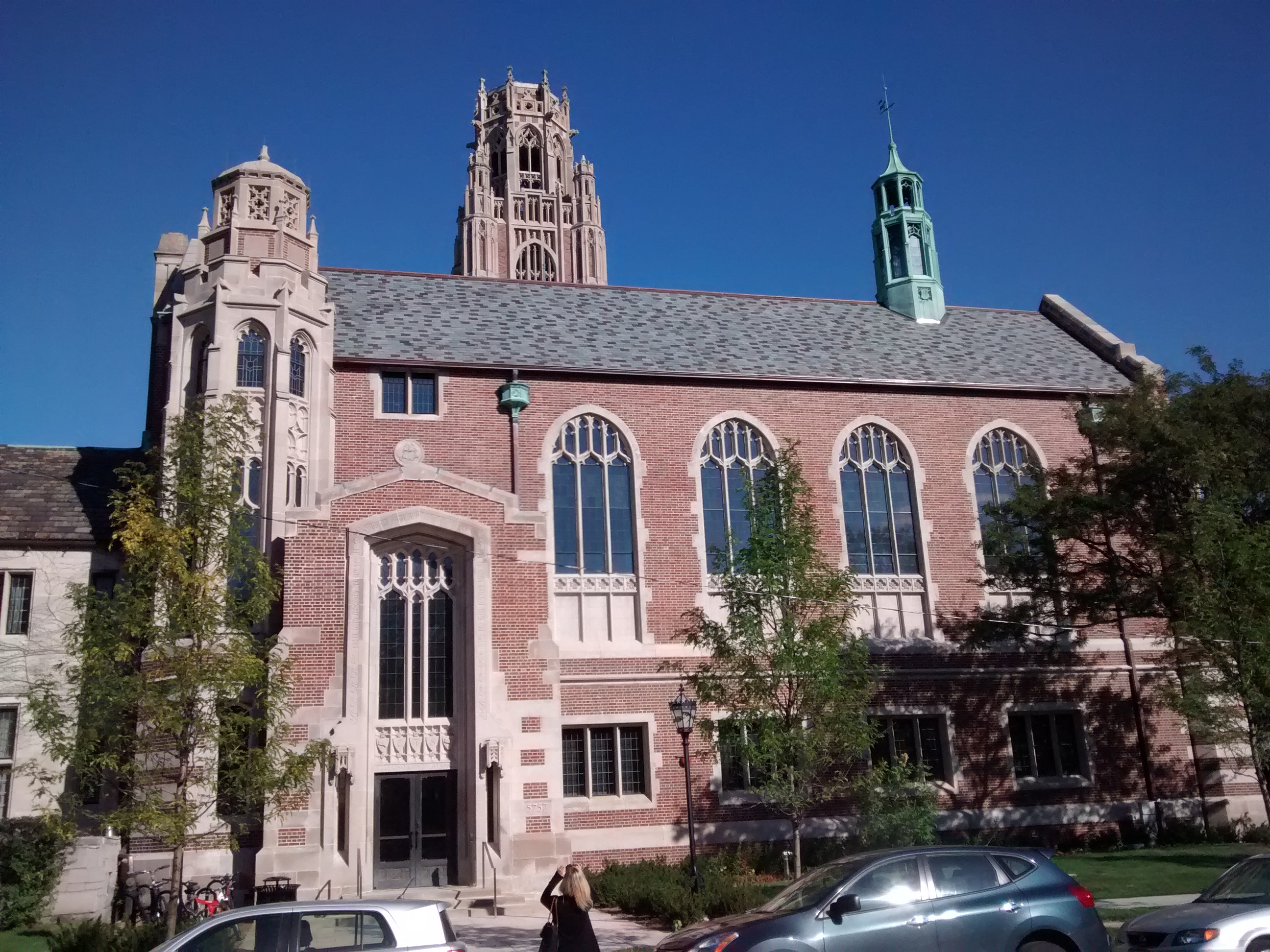
Saieh Hall for Economics, location of the Becker Friedman Institute

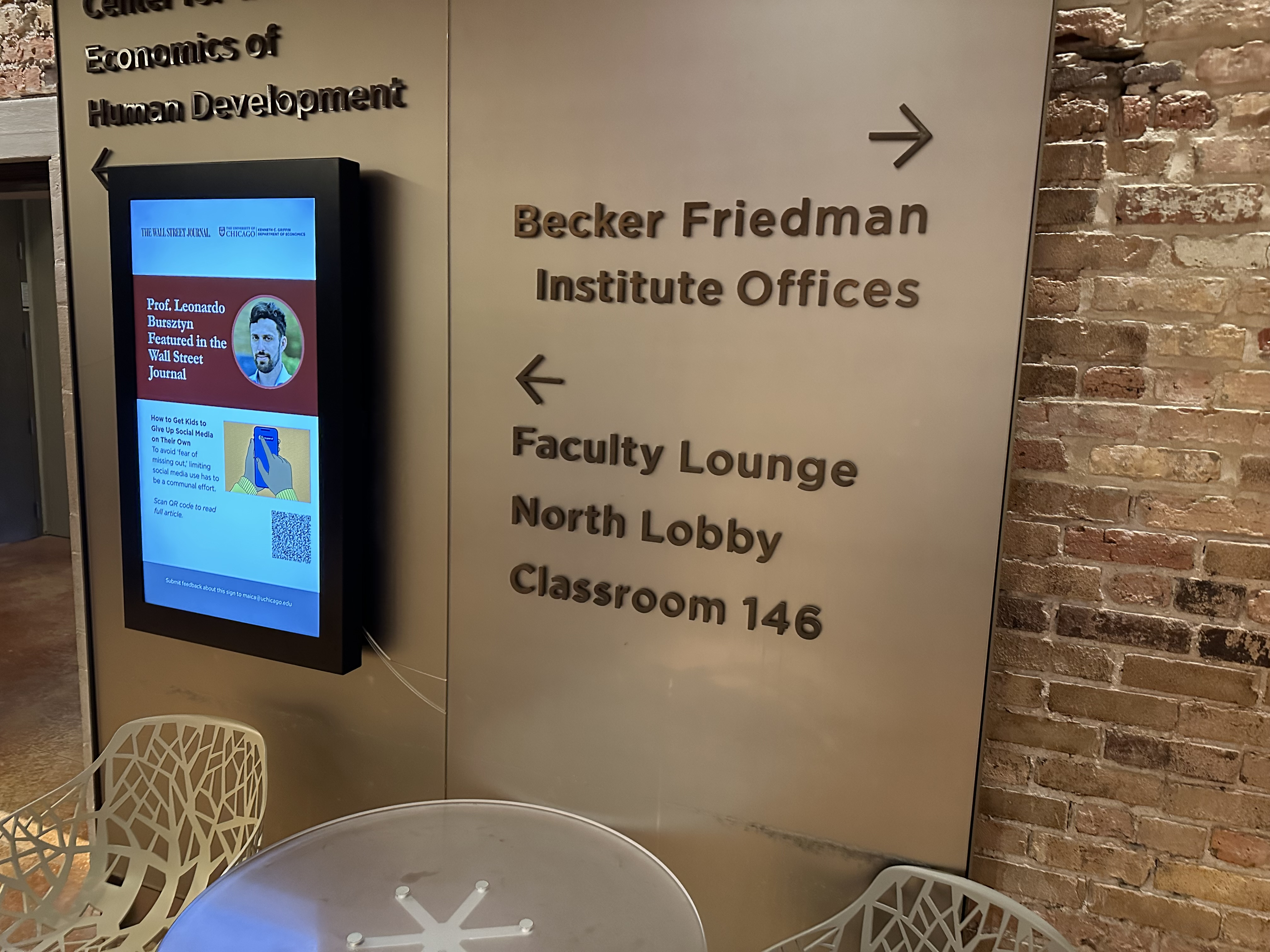
Sign for institute within Saieh Hall

The Gary Becker Milton Friedman Institute for Research in Economics is a collaborative, cross-disciplinary center for research in economics. The institute was established at the University of Chicago in June 2011. It brought together the activities of two formerly independent economic research centers at the university: the Milton Friedman Institute for Research in Economics and the Becker Center on Chicago Price Theory.

The institute is named for two globally influential economists: Gary S. Becker (1930–2014) and his mentor, Milton Friedman (1912–2006), both winners of the Nobel Memorial Prize in Economic Sciences. While they pursued different scholarly paths, Becker and Friedman shared a fundamental belief that economics, grounded in empirical research, is a powerful tool to understand human behavior. While Friedman is known for his lasting contributions to macroeconomics and monetary economics, Becker is recognized for extending microeconomic analysis to a wide range of fields and topics such as marriage, the family, criminal behavior, and racial discrimination.

A collaboration of the University of Chicago's Booth School of Business, Law School, Department of Economics, and the Harris School of Public Policy, the institute builds bridges across disciplines and subfields of economics. Its research conferences, workshops, and initiatives bring economists and scholars from related fields together to share perspectives and refine ideas. The institute also sponsors an active visiting scholars program and offers programs and support for students and promising young researchers.

The institute supports research initiatives in traditional Chicago strengths such as price theory, law and economics, and human capital, as well as topical inquiries into important policy issues such as fiscal imbalance, systemic risk, policy uncertainty, and economics of the family, and newer areas like field experiments in economics.

The institute is directed by John A. List, with Chad Syverson serving as deputy director. An Institute Research Council of distinguished faculty from collaborating university units advises the institute.
