= Center for Economic Studies (U.S. Census Bureau) =

The Center for Economic Studies (CES) is a division of the U.S. Census Bureau that undertakes research and development activities that benefits Census products and programs. CES staff conduct research in economics and other social sciences that have led to discoveries not possible using publicly available data, create new public-use data and internal research data from existing data, and run the Federal Statistical Research Data Centers. The Center for Economic Studies includes a staff of around 50 economists and other social scientists, and additional support staff, and works with customer both within and outside the Census Bureau for research and development of data products.

The center was established in 1982 in the Census Bureau's Economic Directorate, and currently operates in the Census Bureau's Research and Methodology Directorate, headed by the Chief Economist of the Census Bureau, Lucia Foster.

The Center for Economic Studies was recognized by Robert Coase in his 1991 Nobel address: "And we can also hope to learn much more in future from the studies of the activities of firms which have recently been initiated by the Center for Economic Studies of the Bureau of the Census of the United States."

== Public Use Data Products ==
Its public use data products include:

- Business Dynamics Statistics (BDS) provides annual measures of business dynamics for the U.S. economy (such as job creation and destruction, establishment births and deaths, and firm startups and shutdowns), and aggregated by establishment and firm characteristics. The BDS have been used to show that business formation in the U.S. has been declining during the last few decades.
- Business Formation Statistics (BFS) provide high-frequency information on new business applications and formations in the United States.
- LEHD Origin-Destination Employment Statistics (LODES) are annual employment statistics linking home and work locations at the Census block-level. The LODES data are available via the OnTheMap webtool, including a specialized interface for natural and other disasters, OnTheMap for Emergency Management.
- Quarterly Workforce Indicators (QWI) are a set of economic indicators including employment, job creation, earnings, and other measures of employment flows.

== Research ==
The CES Discussion Paper series is hosted by RePEc, and publishes papers written with public use and restricted Census microdata written by the researchers in CES and researchers in the Federal Statistical Research Data Centers.
