= Milton Friedman Institute for Research in Economics =

Former center at the University of Chicago

Coordinates: 41°47′23.5″N 87°35′50.0″W

Between 2008 and 2011, the Milton Friedman Institute for Research in Economics was an academic center established at the University of Chicago as a collaborative, cross-disciplinary site for research in economics.

The Institute aimed to advance, refine, and share research that applied the tools of economic analysis to real-world issues. The institute was named in honor of former Chicago economics professor, Milton Friedman, who is widely recognized for his many enduring contributions to economic analysis. The institute was a collaboration of the University of Chicago Booth School of Business, Department of Economics, and Law School and fostered inquiry across a wide range of topics and subfields. The institute aimed to advance and preserve the unique University of Chicago economic tradition of combining theory and data in rigorous analysis–an approach exemplified by Friedman and others.

The Institute hosted visiting scholars working in subfields of economics, business, law, and related fields such as public policy and medicine. It hosted workshops, seminars, and lectures on fundamental questions across these fields. The Institute also supported advanced professional training for post-doctoral students, as well as expanded opportunities for University of Chicago graduate students. When announcing the creation of the institute in 2008, University President Robert J. Zimmer said its goal was to create "a primary intellectual destination for economics by creating a robust forum for engagement of our faculty and students with scholars and policymakers from around the world." The university had initially planned to invest $200 million in the institute, with half of that in the form of an operating endowment; though the majority of funds were to be raised through donations.

The institute was an object of intense controversy at the university, as many faculty objected both to its objectives as originally framed and to the naming of an institute after Friedman, who was viewed as "polarizing". The announcement of the institute drew a response from more than 170 of the faculty at the university, who argued that to found such an institute would constitute "a symbolic endorsement of his views by the University" and that the proposal reflected "a very narrow research scope even within the field of economics, not to speak of the complete disregard for other disciplines involved in the study of 'economy and society'".

In June 2011, the institute and the Becker Center on Chicago Price Theory were joined to form the new Becker Friedman Institute for Research in Economics.

== See also ==
- Chicago Boys
