= William McBride =

William McBride may refer to:

- William McBride (doctor) (1927–2018), Australian physician
- Will McBride (photographer) (1931–2015), American photographer based in Germany
- Bill McBride (politician) (1945–2012), 2002 candidate for Florida governor
- William V. McBride (1922–2022), general in the United States Air Force, Vice Chief of Staff of the United States Air Force
- William McBride (artist), African-American artist, designer and collector
- Bill McBride (blogger), author of Calculated Risk
- Willie John McBride (William James McBride, born 1940), former rugby union footballer
- William Leon McBride (1938–2026), American philosopher

== See also ==
- "No Man's Land" (Eric Bogle song), a 1976 song also known as "Willie McBride"
