= Doris Dungey =

American writer (1961-2008)

Doris J. Dungey (November 15, 1961 – November 30, 2008) was an American blogger who wrote extensively about the United States housing bubble for the blog Calculated Risk under the pseudonym Tanta.

== Early life and work ==
Born in Oxnard, California to Byron and Eileen Dungey in 1961, she was raised in Bloomington-Normal, Illinois. She earned a master's degree in English from the University of Wisconsin, where she taught until 1989. She then returned to Bloomington, where she wrote the training manual for a local rape crisis center. She worked in the mortgage industry for many years, starting at Champion Federal Savings and Loan Association where she was a trainer and technical writer. Her work for her last employer, Mortgage Dynamics, included securitization due diligence, contract review and technical writing.

== Writing career ==
The blog Calculated Risk was started in 2005 by Bill McBride, a former technology executive who believed that the United States housing market was near its peak, and he posted articles and statistics to his blog to support his argument. Dungey started posting to the blog, using the pseudonym Tanta, a family nickname, because she hoped to return to work in the mortgage business. As Tanta, Dungey used her inside knowledge of the mortgage industry and humor to post corrections and analysis of her own about mortgage financing. December 2006 marked her first post to the blog, criticizing a Citigroup report that was confident that the mortgage industry would "rationalize" in 2007.

Her work for the blog included The Compleat ÜberNerd, a series of 13 articles that provided an in-depth summary of the mortgage business from origination and servicing, to mortgage-backed securities, negative amortization and foreclosure, which was called a "definitive word on the subject" by The New York Times.

She was quoted by CBS News in April 2008, emphasizing that the subprime mortgage crisis was not the result of the inherent complexity of instruments like collateralized debt obligations, but was caused by excessive leverage that was part of efforts to "goose the yield" of mortgage securities to offer higher interest rates to investors by creating "complex cash-flow structures hedged by complex rate swaps". The Federal Reserve cited her in its 2008 paper Understanding the Securitization of Subprime Mortgage Credit.

Her posts influenced a number of economists and journalists through their wit and clarity. In 2007 Felix Salmon, writing for Condé Nast Portfolio, called her "one of the best financial writers in the world". The week after her death, Alyssa Katz wrote for the Columbia Journalism Review that "journalism [has] lost its most incisive, stubbornly accurate, and unfailingly hilarious chronicler of the failings of the mortgage industry."

One of her final posts to the blog, in September 2008, criticized a proposed aspect of the 2008 bailout plan, which would have had the United States Department of the Treasury purchase bad loans directly from banks. As Tanta, she argued that bank executives should be forced to explain why they purchased the asset in the first place, what they learned from seeing the asset go bad and how they will ensure that the same mistake is not made in the future.

== Death ==
Dungey, who had lived in Upper Marlboro, Maryland, died at age 47 on November 30, 2008, of ovarian cancer.
