= Calculated Risk (blog) =

Finance and economics blog

Calculated Risk is a finance and economics blog. It was started in early 2005 by former technology executive Bill McBride (pseudonym Calculated Risk), with frequent posts by Doris Dungey (under the pseudonym Tanta) until her death on November 30, 2008 from ovarian cancer. As an early predictor of the United States housing bubble, Calculated Risk developed a "cult following" and influence over US fiscal policy. In January 2009, it received approximately 75,000 page views a day and was the top economics blog by traffic statistics.
