= False or misleading statements by Donald Trump =

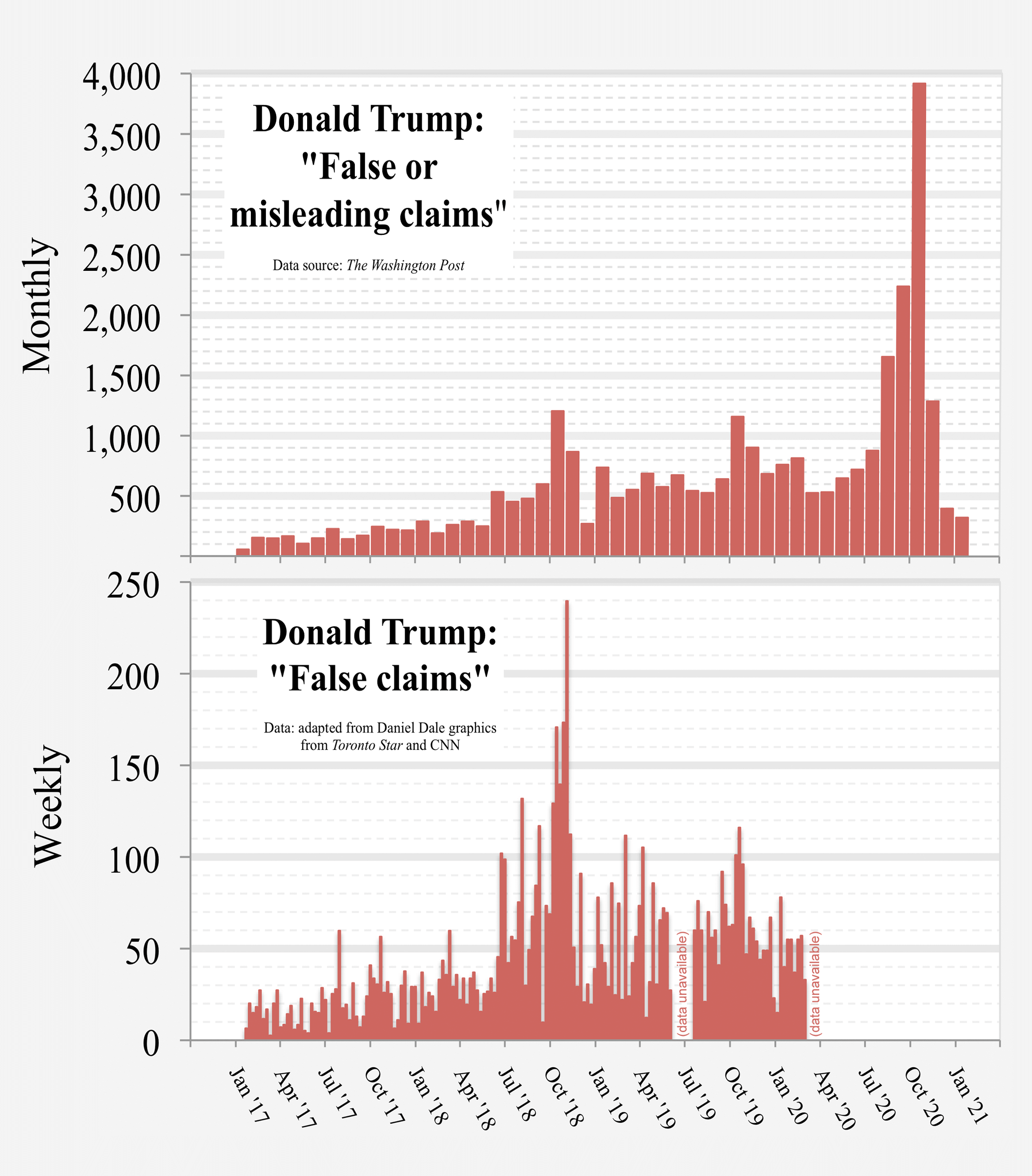
Fact-checkers from The Washington Post (top, monthly), the Toronto Star and CNN (bottom, weekly) compiled data on "false or misleading claims" and "false claims", respectively. The peaks corresponded in late 2018 to the midterm elections, in late 2019 to his impeachment inquiry, and in late 2020 to the presidential election. The Post reported 30,573 false or misleading claims in four years, an average of more than 20.9 per day.

During and between his terms as president of the United States, Donald Trump has made tens of thousands of false or misleading claims. Fact-checkers at The Washington Post documented 30,573 false or misleading claims during his first presidential term, an average of 21 per day. Commentators and fact-checkers have described Trump's lying as unprecedented in American politics, and the consistency of falsehoods as a distinctive part of his business and political identities. Scholarly analysis of Trump's tweets found significant evidence of an intent to deceive.

Many news organizations initially resisted describing Trump's falsehoods as lies, but began to do so by June 2019. The Washington Post said his frequent repetition of claims he knew to be false amounted to a campaign based on disinformation. Steve Bannon, Trump's 2016 presidential campaign CEO and chief strategist during the first seven months of Trump's first presidency, said that the press, rather than Democrats, was Trump's primary adversary and "the way to deal with them is to flood the zone with shit." In February 2025, a public relations CEO stated that the "flood the zone" tactic (also known as the firehose of falsehood) was designed to make sure no single action or event stands out above the rest by having them occur at a rapid pace, thus preventing the public from keeping up and preventing controversy or outrage over any specific action or event.

As part of their attempts to overturn the 2020 U.S. presidential election, Trump and his allies repeatedly falsely claimed there had been massive election fraud and that Trump had won the election. Their effort was characterized by some as an implementation of Hitler's "big lie" propaganda technique. In June 2023, a criminal grand jury indicted Trump on one count of making "false statements and representations", specifically by hiding subpoenaed classified documents from his own attorney who was trying to find and return them to the government. In August 2023, 21 of Trump's falsehoods about the 2020 election were listed in his Washington, D.C. criminal indictment, and 27 were listed in his Georgia criminal indictment. It has been suggested that Trump's false statements amount to bullshit rather than lies, as defined in the 1986 essay On Bullshit.

== Veracity and politics ==
Many academics and observers who study the American political scene have called Trump unique or highly unusual in his lying and its effect on political discourse. "It has long been a truism that politicians lie", wrote Carole McGranahan for the American Ethnologist in 2017, but "Donald Trump is different". He is the most "accomplished and effective liar" to have ever participated in American politics; moreover, his lying has reshaped public discourse so that "the frequency, degree, and impact of lying in politics are now unprecedented".

Historian Douglas Brinkley stated that U.S. presidents have occasionally "lied or misled the country", but none were a "serial liar" like Trump. Donnel Stern, writing in Psychoanalytic Dialogues in 2019, declared: "We expect politicians to stretch the truth. But Trump is a whole different animal", because Trump "lies as a policy", and "will say anything" to satisfy his supporters or himself.

Heidi Taksdal Skjeseth, writing for the Reuters Institute for the Study of Journalism in 2017, described how lies have "always been an integral part of politics". However, Trump was "delivering untruths on an unprecedented scale", during his campaign and presidency. Skjeseth commented that no one in French politics was comparable to Trump in his provision of falsehoods.

Jeremy Adam Smith wrote that "lying is a feature, not a bug, of Trump's campaign and presidency." Thomas B. Edsall wrote "Donald Trump can lay claim to the title of most prodigious liar in the history of the presidency." George C. Edwards III wrote: "Donald Trump tells more untruths than any previous president. There is no one that is a close second." CNN fact checker Daniel Dale wrote "it’s abundantly clear that there is no public official in Washington who lies like Trump" and calls him a "rare, very possibly once-in-a-lifetime political liar."

=== Repetition ===
Trump is conscious of the value of repetition to get his lies believed. He demonstrated this knowledge when he instructed Stephanie Grisham, his White House press secretary, to use his method of lying: "As long as you keep repeating something, it doesn't matter what you say."

Trump effectively uses the big lie technique's method of repetition to exploit the illusory truth effect, a tendency to believe false information to be correct after repeated exposure. Research has studied Trump's use of the effect.

New research published in Public Opinion Quarterly reveals a correlation between the number of times President Donald Trump repeated falsehoods during his presidency and misperceptions among Republicans, and that the repetition effect was stronger on the beliefs of people who consume information primarily from right-leaning news outlets.

The Washington Post fact-checker created a new category of falsehoods in 2018, the "Bottomless Pinocchio", for falsehoods repeated at least twenty times (so often "that there can be no question the politician is aware his or her facts are wrong"). Trump was the only politician who met the standard of the category, with 14 statements that immediately qualified. According to the Post Trump repeated some falsehoods so many times he had effectively engaged in disinformation. CNN fact-checker Daniel Dale notes that news outlets may initially check a false claim by Trump, but are unlikely to continue pointing out that it's false, "especially because he is constantly mixing in dozens of new lies that require time and resources to address. And so, by virtue of shameless perseverance, Trump often manages to outlast most of the media's willingness to correct any particular falsehood".

=== Bullshit ===
It has been suggested that Trump's apparent "avalanche of lies" consists of bullshit rather than of lying as strictly defined. According to Harry Frankfurt's influential 2005 book On Bullshit, the liar cares about the truth and attempts to hide it, while the bullshitter does not care whether what they say is true or false. Eduardo Porter writes in The Washington Post that Frankfurt's bullshitter definition fits Trump: "To subvert the truth, you must first know it, or at least think you do. That’s not Trump’s game." For example, Trump does not, in Porter's argument, have to check US unemployment or inflation statistics to assert that "we inherited from the last administration an economic catastrophe and an inflation nightmare", because for bullshit, the facts do not matter. On the contrary, by ignoring the facts, bullshit has the power to guide group beliefs in a politically desirable direction and thereby to shape group identities. As early as 2015, Jeet Heer wrote that Trump’s propensity to bullshit is not an aberration in his party: "Over the last two decades, the GOP as a party has increasingly adopted positions that are not just politically extreme but also in defiance of facts and science".

== Business career ==
=== Real estate ===
Within years of expanding his father's property development business into Manhattan in the early 1970s, Trump attracted the attention of The New York Times for his brash and controversial style, with one real-estate financier observing in 1976, "His deals are dramatic, but they haven't come into being. So far, the chief beneficiary of his creativity has been his public image." Der Scutt, the prominent architect who designed Trump Tower, said in 1976, "He's extremely aggressive when he sells, maybe to the point of overselling. Like, he'll say the convention center is the biggest in the world, when it really isn't. He'll exaggerate for the purpose of making a sale." A 1984 GQ profile of Trump quoted him stating he owned the whole block on Central Park South and Avenue of the Americas. GQ noted that the two buildings Trump owned were likely less than a sixth of the block.

The New York state attorney general, Letitia James, opened a civil investigation into Trump's business practices, especially regarding inflated property values. She joined the Manhattan district attorney's office in a criminal investigation into possible property tax fraud by the Trump Organization.

=== Other investments and debt ===
In 1984, Trump posed as his own spokesman John Barron and made false assertions of his wealth to secure a higher ranking on the Forbes 400 list of wealthy Americans, including by claiming he owned over 90% of his family's business. Audio recordings of these claims were released in 2018 by journalist Jonathan Greenberg.

Following the October 1987 stock market crash, Trump claimed to the press that he had taken no losses and sold all his stock a month before. Per SEC filings he owned large stakes in some companies during the crash. Forbes calculated that Trump had lost at least $19 million related to Resorts International stock, while journalist Gwenda Blair noted $22 million from stock in the Alexander's department store chain.

Challenging estimates of his net worth he considered too low, in 1989 Trump said he had very little debt. Reuters reported Trump owed $4 billion (~$8.7 billion in 2025) to more than 70 banks at the beginning of 1990. In 1997, Ben Berzin Jr., who had been tasked with recovering some of the $100 million (~$186 million in 2025) his bank had lent Trump, said "During the time that I dealt with Mr. Trump, I was continually surprised by his mastery of situational ethics. He does not seem to be able to differentiate between fact and fiction."

A 1998 New York Observer article reported that Jerry Nadler "flatly calls Mr. Trump a 'liar'", quoting Nadler stating, "Trump got $6 million [in federal money] in the dead of night when no one knew anything about it" by slipping a provision into a $200 billion federal transportation bill. During a 2005 deposition in a defamation lawsuit he initiated about his worth, Trump said: "My net worth fluctuates, and it goes up and down with markets and with attitudes and with feelings, even my own feelings ... and that can change rapidly from day to day".

=== Philanthropy ===
David Fahrenthold investigated Trump's claims about his charitable giving and found little evidence the claims are true. Following Fahrenthold's reporting, the Attorney General of New York opened an inquiry into the Donald J. Trump Foundation's fundraising practices, and issued a "notice of violation" ordering the Foundation to stop raising money in New York. The Foundation had to admit it engaged in self-dealing practices to benefit Trump, his family, and businesses.

=== Sports ===
In 1983, when Trump was forming a business relationship with the New Jersey Generals football team, he spoke about the team at a public forum. "He promised the signing of superstar players he would never sign. He announced the hiring of immortal coaches he would never hire. He scheduled a news conference the next day to confirm all of it, and the next day never came", CNN reporter Keith Olbermann recalled in 2021. Following the forum, Trump approached Olbermann and, rather than waiting for questions, began speaking into Olbermann's microphone about "an entirely different set of coaches and players than he had from the podium."

In 1987, during testimony regarding an antitrust case between the United States Football League (USFL) and the National Football League (NFL), Trump stated that he had had a meeting with NFL commissioner Pete Rozelle years earlier where Rozelle offered him an NFL franchise in exchange for keeping the USFL a spring-time league and not initiating a lawsuit with the NFL. Rozelle denied having made this offer and stated he was opposed to Trump becoming an NFL team owner, with a person present at the meeting between the two stating that Rozelle told Trump, "As long as I or my heirs are involved in the NFL, you will never be a franchise owner in the league".

In 1996, Trump claimed he wagered $1 million (~$1.89 million in 2025) on 20-to-1 odds boxing match between Evander Holyfield and Mike Tyson. The Las Vegas Sun reported that "while everyone is careful not to call Trump a liar", no one in a position to know about such a sizable wager was aware of it.

In a 2004 book, The Games Do Count: America's Best and Brightest on the Power of Sports, Trump claimed to have hit "the winning home run" when his school played Cornwall High School in 1964, garnering a headline "Trump Homers to Win the Game" in a local newspaper. Years later, a journalist discovered that Trump's high school did not play Cornwall that year, nor did any such local headline surface. A classmate recalled a separate incident in high school in which Trump had hit "a blooper the fielders misplayed", sending the ball "just over the third baseman's head", yet Trump insisted to him: "I want you to remember this: I hit the ball out of the ballpark!"

After purchasing the Trump National Golf Club in 2009, Trump placed a historical marker there asserting that during the American Civil War, the river "would turn red" with the blood of "many" soldiers who were killed at that spot. No such event ever took place at this site. One local historian, Craig Swain, cited the killing of two soldiers by citizens in 1861 as the only Civil War event that occurred on the island.

Two years later, on June 27–28, 1863, General J. E. B. Stuart led 4,500 Confederate soldiers north across the Potomac at Rowser's Ford from the Lowes Island area, on the ride to Gettysburg, but no fatalities were recorded.

According to the executive director of the Mosby Heritage Area Association, the only Civil War battle in the area was the Battle of Ball's Bluff, 11 miles (18 km) upriver. Other historians consulted by The New York Times for a story in 2015 agreed; one of them had written to the Trump Organization about the falsehood. Trump himself disputed the historians' statements:

That was a prime site for river crossings. So, if people are crossing the river, and you happen to be in a civil war, I would say that people were shot – a lot of them. "How would they know that?" Mr. Trump asked when told that local historians had called his plaque a fiction. "Were they there?"

Trump said that "numerous historians" had told him the story of the River of Blood, though he later changed that to say the historians had spoken to "my people". Finally he said, "Write your story the way you want to write it. You don't have to talk to anybody. It doesn't make any difference. But many people were shot. It makes sense."

Trump has repeatedly claimed he is an 18-time club championship winner at several clubs, none of which can be positively confirmed, and 16 of which were not official or all-member club championships. All these wins have been recorded at golf clubs owned or managed by The Trump Organization. Professional and amateur golfers, such as Buddy Marucci, have claimed that Trump would threaten to revoke the membership of anyone who won against him, thus allowing him to win club championships with little competition. Trump has claimed to have won the Trump International Golf Club West Palm Beach Club Championship in 1999, before the club was officially opened to membership, and the 2023 Senior Club Championship at the same course, despite not being present for the first day.

=== Other ===
In 1973, The New York Times ran its first profile of Trump, stating he had "graduated first in his class from the Wharton School of Finance" five years earlier. However, in 1984, The New York Times Magazine noted that "the commencement program from 1968 does not list him as graduating with honors of any kind."

After three Trump casino executives died in a 1989 helicopter crash, Trump claimed that he, too, had nearly boarded the helicopter. The claim was denied 30 years later by a former vice president of the Trump Organization.

Promoting his Trump University after its formation in 2004, Trump asserted he would handpick all its instructors. Michael Sexton, former president of the venture, stated in a 2012 deposition that Trump selected none.

During a 2018 interview, television personality Billy Bush recounted a conversation he had had with Trump, in which he refuted Trump's repeated false claims that The Apprentice was the top-rated television program in America. Bush recalled Trump responding, "Billy, look, you just tell them and they believe it. That's it: you just tell them and they believe. They just do."

=== Perceptions ===
Alair Townsend, a former budget director and deputy mayor of New York during the 1980s, and a former publisher of Crain's New York Business, said "I wouldn't believe Donald Trump if his tongue were notarized." Leona Helmsley later used this line as her own when she spoke about Trump in her 1990 interview in Playboy magazine.

Trump often appeared in New York tabloid newspapers. Recalling her career with New York Post's Page Six column, Susan Mulcahy told Vanity Fair in 2004, "I wrote about him a certain amount, but I actually would sit back and be amazed at how often people would write about him in a completely gullible way. He was a great character, but he was full of crap 90 percent of the time." (Trump told the magazine, "I agree with her 100 percent.") Barbara Res, a former Trump Organization vice president who worked for Trump from 1978 until 1998, said "he would tell the staff his ridiculous lies, and after a while, no one believed a single word he would say".

== In The Art of the Deal ==
Tony Schwartz is a journalist who ghostwrote Trump: The Art of the Deal. In July 2016, Schwartz was interviewed by Jane Mayer for articles in The New Yorker. He described Trump highly unfavorably, and described how he came to regret writing The Art of the Deal. When Schwartz wrote it, he created the phrase "truthful hyperbole", as an "artful euphemism" to describe Trump's "loose relationship with the truth". This passage provides context, written in Trump's voice: "I play to people's fantasies ... People want to believe that something is the biggest and the greatest and the most spectacular. I call it truthful hyperbole. It's an innocent form of exaggeration—and it's a very effective form of promotion". He said Trump "loved the phrase".

Schwartz said "deceit" is never "innocent". He also said, "'Truthful hyperbole' is a contradiction in terms. It's a way of saying, 'It's a lie, but who cares?'" Schwartz repeated his criticism on Good Morning America and Real Time with Bill Maher, saying he "put lipstick on a pig".

Schwartz described Trump's lying:

'Lying is second nature to him,' Schwartz said. 'More than anyone else I have ever met, Trump has the ability to convince himself that whatever he is saying at any given moment is true, or sort of true, or at least ought to be true.'

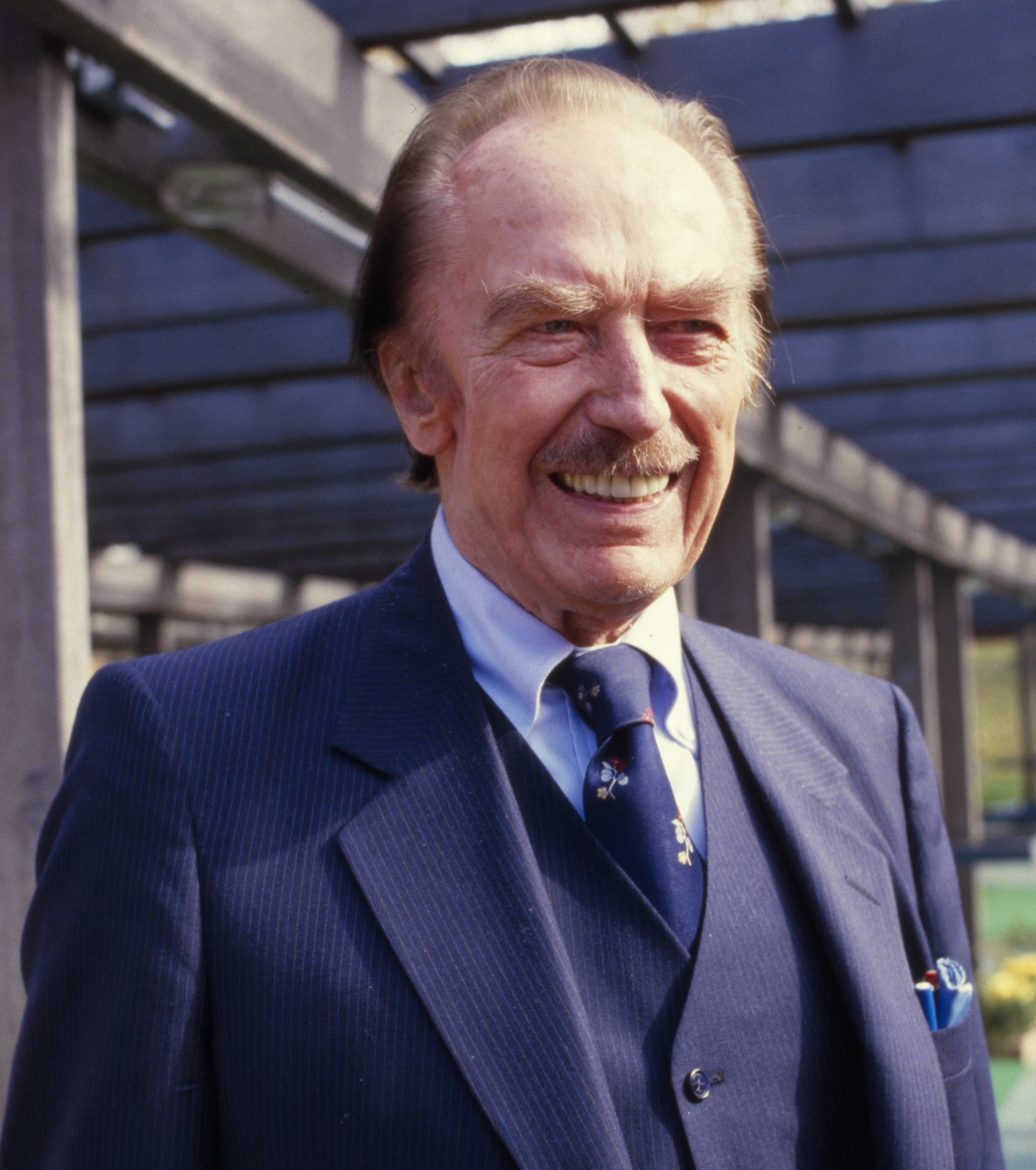
Donald Trump's father, Fred, c. 1986

Fearing that anti-German sentiments during and after World War II would negatively affect his business, Trump's father, Fred Trump, began claiming Swedish descent. Both parents of Fred Trump were born and raised in Kallstadt, Kingdom of Bavaria, now part of Germany. The falsehood was repeated by Donald to the press and in The Art of the Deal, where he claimed his grandfather, Friedrich Trump, "came here from Sweden as a child". In the same book, Donald said his father was born in New Jersey. When asked during his presidency why he upheld the false narrative about his father being Swedish, Trump said, "My father spent a lot of time [in Sweden]. But it was never really something really discussed very much." As president, Trump on at least three occasions claimed his father was born in Germany. Trump's father is of German descent but was born in the Bronx. In one case Trump said his father was "born in a very wonderful place in Germany", and another time stated, "I was raised by the biggest kraut of them all", invoking an ethnic slur for a German. The Guardian pointed out the irony of Trump supporting the "birtherism" conspiracy theory asserting Barack Obama was born in Africa.

Biographers, associates and fact-checkers have cast doubt on the book's version of events. To those with detailed knowledge of the projects, the singular hero of the book appeared instead as a fictional composite of the many power-brokers, doers and domain experts who actually made things happen. This omniscient persona faced exaggerated odds and won overstated profits. As biographer Gwenda Blair wrote in 2000, "In The Art of the Deal, [Trump] claims that business deals are what distinguish him ... but his most original creation is the continuous self-inflation." Still, those tracing out Trump's life could not discern the more limited reality all at once. Speaking 20 years later, Blair bemoaned her failure, as a biographer, to have "understood how fabricated [the book] was ... how that founding myth was so riddled with at best exaggeration."

Chapter four, "The Cincinnati Kid", tells the story of Trump's "first big deal". According to the book, Trump came up with the idea of buying Swifton Village, a struggling apartment complex in Cincinnati. He partnered with his father Fred to turn Swifton around; then, just as the neighborhood headed irretrievably downhill, tricked a buyer into overpaying: "The price was $12 million—or approximately a $6 million profit for us. It was a huge return on a short-term investment." Roy Knight, part of the Village's maintenance crew, told reporters that the project was actually Fred Trump's "baby"; biographers generally agree. Donald was cloistered at New York Military Academy when his father boarded a plane to Ohio and won the property at auction. He attended college while Fred turned things around. The younger Trump did visit on occasion, but only to do "yardwork and cleaning". Finally, the sale price was $6.75 million, $1 million more than the purchase price, representing little if any profit after eight years of expenses (estimated at $500,000) and interest.

Chapter six, "Grand Hyatt", tells the story of Trump's true first big deal. Without it, the book opined, "I'd probably be back in Brooklyn today, collecting rents." In his 1992 biography of Trump, journalist Wayne Barrett, who had covered the project in detail, took issue with many of the book's claims. In particular, he noted the absence of nearly all the key players—from New York governor Hugh Carey, a longtime Trump family associate, to city planners betting their careers on the novel private-public partnership, to Louise Sunshine, Carey's former chief fundraiser. "In The Art of the Deal," Barrett wrote, "it was as if Donald walked out onstage alone."

Chapter seven, "Trump Tower," opens with a fully hatched plan. "In order to put up the building I had in mind, I was going to have to assemble several ... adjacent pieces—and then seek numerous zoning variances." George Ross, one of Trump's lawyers on the project and later his lieutenant on The Apprentice, seasons 1–5, recalled the process differently. Where Trump depicted himself expertly poring over his "air-rights contract" and "discover[ing] an unexpected bonus," Ross wrote: "I enlightened Donald about the zoning laws that permitted one owner to sell and transfer unused building rights (commonly called air rights)." One key step involved the adjacent Tiffany's store. "Unfortunately, I didn't know anyone at Tiffany," Trump wrote, "and the owner, Walter Hoving, was known not only as a legendary retailer but also as a difficult, demanding, mercurial guy." Trump claimed that he cold-called Hoving and tricked him into a one-sided deal. Per Ross, however, the transaction was aboveboard and owed entirely to Fred Trump's business connections: "Donald's father and Walter Hoving had done some business together and Donald's father suggested to Donald that he could work out a fair deal with Hoving in a short period of time."

Based on Trump's tax returns between 1985 and 1994 which showed a loss greater than "nearly any other individual American taxpayer" during that period, co-author Schwartz suggested that the book might be "recategorized as fiction".

== September 11 attacks ==
On September 11, after at least one of the World Trade Center towers was destroyed, Trump said in an interview with WWOR-TV in New York: "40 Wall Street actually was the second-tallest building in downtown Manhattan, and it was actually, before the World Trade Center, was the tallest—and then, when they built the World Trade Center, it became known as the second tallest, and now it's the tallest." There was a building in Lower Manhattan that was taller than the 71-story Trump Building at 40 Wall Street: that was 70 Pine Street, taller by 25 feet (7.6 m). Two days after the attack, Trump stood near Ground Zero and told a television station he was paying two hundred of his employees to come "find and identify victims". No record of such work has ever been found. In 2023, he reposted the claim on Truth Social. In 2026, he told a crowd that he sent a construction crew to Ground Zero "right after" the attack and that "two firemen" had prompted him to evacuate from the U.S. Steel Building. He said: "They grabbed me under the arms and said, 'Gotta get out of here.' ... They lifted me up and started running with me." The New York Times wrote "There is no evidence backing up Mr. Trump’s claim."

At a rally in Columbus, Ohio, in 2015, Trump said "I have a view—a view in my apartment that was specifically aimed at the World Trade Center." He added "and I watched those people jump and I watched the second plane hit ... I saw the second plane hit the building and I said, 'Wow that's unbelievable.'" At the time of the attack, Trump lived in Trump Tower more than four miles (6 km) away from the World Trade Center towers. His campaign did not respond to inquiries about how it was possible for him to see people jumping from that far away.

In another rally in 2015, Trump claimed seeing "thousands and thousands" of Arab Americans in New Jersey cheering during the collapse of the World Trade Center. News organizations like the Associated Press (AP), The Washington Post, and The Star-Ledger reported rumors of 9/11 celebrations in New Jersey, but they were found to be unfounded, unsourced, or finding that people were memorializing the event. Nobody else was known to remember seeing masses of thousands of people celebrating after 9/11. Furthermore, Trump would not have been able to clearly see people cheering in New Jersey from his residence.

On predicting 9/11 to Pete Hegseth

History will never forget that it was the SEALs who stormed the compound at^{[sic]} Osama bin Laden and put a bullet in his head. Remember that. And please remember I wrote about Osama bin Laden exactly one year ago, one year before he blew up the World Trade Center. And I said, ‘You got to watch Osama bin Laden.’ I said one year before to Pete Hegseth. I said one year before. Where’s Pete? In the book I wrote—whatever the hell the title, I can’t tell you. But I can tell you there’s a page in there devoted to the fact that I saw somebody named Osama bin Laden, and I didn’t like it, and you got to take care of him. They didn’t do it. A year later, he blew up the World Trade Center.

— Trump at Naval Station Norfolk Pier 14, Norfolk, Virginia
October 5, 2025

During his 2016 campaign, Trump falsely claimed to have predicted the attacks in his 2000 book The America We Deserve (ghostwritten by Dave Shiflett), that Osama bin Laden was not well known when the book was published, and that it called for the U.S. to "take him out". The book does contain two separate passages that mention bin Laden (who had been on the FBI's Ten Most Wanted Fugitives list since June 7, 1999) and suggest an incident worse than the 1993 World Trade Center bombing may occur, but it does not call for the preemptive killing of bin Laden nor suggest he would be the one to orchestrate such an event if not killed. The ghostwriter, Shiflett, has called The America We Deserve "[his] first work of fiction".

During his second presidency on October 5, 2025, Trump reiterated the falsehood at an event in Norfolk, Virginia celebrating the upcoming 250th anniversary of the US Navy's founding (October 13). Bringing up the 2011 killing of Osama bin Laden under the Obama administration, Trump subsequently claimed to have warned his incumbent Secretary of Defense Pete Hegseth of bin Laden's activity before the September 11th attacks in 2000 (or erroneously in 2024). In 2000, 19-year-old Hegseth enrolled at Princeton University, most likely never meeting Trump during his enrollment. Hegseth would not become the United States Secretary of Defense until January 25, 2025 at age 44, over two decades after the attack and less than ten months before Trump made this version of the false claim.

== 2016 presidential campaign ==
Trump promoted conspiracy theories that have lacked empirical support. These have included "birther" theories that Barack Obama was not born in the US. In 2011, Trump took credit for the release of Obama's "long-form" birth certificate, while raising doubt about its legitimacy, and in 2016 admitted that Obama was a natural-born citizen from Hawaii. He then falsely stated that Hillary Clinton started the conspiracy theories.

In 2015, Boing Boing reproduced newspaper articles from 1927 reporting that Trump's father had been arrested at a Ku Klux Klan march and been discharged. Multiple articles on the incident list Fred Trump's address in Jamaica, Queens, as do the 1930 census and a 1936 wedding announcement. Trump admitted to The New York Times that the address was "where my grandmother lived and my father, early on." When asked about the 1927 story, he denied his father had ever lived at that address and said the arrest "never happened", and "There was nobody charged."

Within six months of Trump's announcement of his presidential campaign, FactCheck.org declared Trump the "King of Whoppers", stating, "In the 12 years of FactCheck.org's existence, we've never seen his match. He stands out not only for the sheer number of his factually false claims, but also for his brazen refusals to admit error when proven wrong." In 2016, Trump suggested that Ted Cruz's father was involved in the assassination of John F. Kennedy. He also accused Cruz of stealing the Iowa caucuses during the 2016 Republican Party presidential primaries.

Trump claimed that his father had given him "a small loan of a million dollars", which he used to build "a company that's worth more than $10 billion", denying Marco Rubio's allegation that he had inherited $200 million. A 2018 New York Times exposé on Fred and Donald Trump's finances concludes that Donald "was a millionaire by age 8", and that he had received $413 million (adjusted for inflation) from his father's business empire over his lifetime, including over $60 million ($140 million in 2018 currency) in loans, which were largely unreimbursed.

Trump claimed repeatedly on the campaign trail in 2015 that the actual unemployment rate of around 5% "isn't reflective [of reality] ... I've seen numbers of 24%, I actually saw a number of 42% unemployment". PolitiFact rated this claim "Pants on Fire", its rating for the most egregious falsehoods. Jeremy Adam Smith, writing for the Greater Good Magazine, said Trump's falsehoods may be "blue lies", which are "told on behalf of a group, that can actually strengthen the bonds among the members of that group". As a result, he posited, Trump's dishonesty does not lose the support of his political base, even while it "infuriates and confuses almost everyone else".

In 2015, BuzzFeed News's Andrew Kaczynski reported that Trump, despite having claimed to have the best memory in the world, had a history of "conveniently forgetting" people or organizations in ways that benefit him. In July 2016, PolitiFact's Linda Qiu pointed out that Trump "seems to suffer bouts of amnesia when it comes to his own statements". Kaczynski and Qiu cited examples of Trump's stating he did not know anything about former Ku Klux Klan leader David Duke, despite statements showing he clearly knew who Duke was. Over three months before the 2016 presidential election, Trump claimed it was going to be "rigged".

In 2016, Trump said repeatedly that he would jail Hillary Clinton. In an interview with Will Cain on Fox & Friends Weekend in June 2024, he denied ever having said so. He blamed his supporters for chanting that message: "I didn't say 'lock her up,' but the people said 'lock her up, lock her up'." He suggested he "could have done it, but I felt it would have been a terrible thing." On June 4, he called into Newsmax, claiming he always believed it would have been "terrible to throw the president's wife and the former secretary of state ... into jail", yet this time adding the threat: "It's very possible that it's going to have to happen to them."

=== Border wall with Mexico ===
Throughout his campaign and into his presidency, Trump repeatedly claimed the US would "build the wall and make Mexico pay for it". President of Mexico Enrique Peña Nieto said his country would not pay, and never did. While not unusual for a campaign promise to not pan out, Trump's insistence Mexico would pay was a central element of his campaign and continued for years. At the 2020 Conservative Political Action Conference, Trump reiterated saying, "Mexico is paying for it and it's every bit—it's better than the wall that was projected."

== Sanewashing of Donald Trump ==
During the 2024 presidential campaign, the unlikelihood of some of Trump's falsehoods—for example, that images of Harris's campaign crowds were generated by AI; that in Springfield, Ohio, illegal immigrants were eating neighbors' pets; or that schoolchildren were receiving surgery to change their gender—and the incoherence of his answers and unscripted addresses drew attention from experts and the media, who questioned Trump's mental state and fitness to serve.

On September 5, 2024, Trump addressed the Economic Club of New York, where he was asked, "If you win in November, can you commit to prioritizing legislation to make childcare affordable, and if so, what specific piece of legislation would you advance?" A commentator from The Independent characterized Trump's two-minute, 362-word tariff-centered response as "word salad", and a CNN commentator remarked that it "could accurately be described as a ramble without an answer". Several news media reports about the event did not mention or comment on that answer, including The New York Times.

That kind of characterization (or lack thereof), plus previous occasions in which the media interpreted Trump's answers instead of transcribing (and fact-checking) them, has been denounced as "sanewashing."

On September 12, 2024, the Poynter Institute defined "sanewashing" as "the act of packaging radical and outrageous statements in a way that makes them seem normal", and proposed ways to avoid doing it. On October 6, 2024, The New York Times published an article reviewing Trump's public statements. A computer analysis found out that Trump's speeches last longer, and include more all-or-nothing, negative, and curse terms, all of which point at cognitive changes since 2015. The analysis found that the complexity of Trump's speeches remained relatively steady in recent years, at a fourth-grade level (equivalent to a nine- or ten-year-old child). The article presents testimonies of former collaborators and acquaintances, plus comparisons of his present addresses with recordings from years earlier, "clearer and more comprehensible than now, and balanced with flashes of humor." The article notes that the Trump campaign has refused to release his medical records, and ends with a quote of his from a rally: "Trump is never wrong. I am never, ever wrong." On October 15, The Washington Post noted that recent polls showed that Trump's age and mental acuity were of increasing concern for voters, though it is not clear whether the same applies to swing voters.

After the election, mainstream media continued to be criticized and accused of sanewashing Trump's most controversial statements.

== Numbers ==
Glenn Kessler, a fact checker for the Washington Post, noted that many of the over 30,000 documented false or misleading first term Trump pronouncements involved numbers. A 2026 NPR report showed that Trump's figures will often shift from day to day and, at times are mathematically impossible. One cited example is a false Trump claim that drug prices would be reduced 1,500%.

Noting voluminous false statistics Trump frequently states on the subjects of polls, inflation, investments, and crowd sizes among others, CNN fact checker Daniel Dale wrote in 2026 that "all of Trump's numbers are suspect."

In addition, the New York Times noted Trump's tendency to question statistics of others, falsely calling numbers that run counter to his narrative "fake", "phony" and "a fraud."

== "Two weeks" ==
Analysts have noted Trump's frequent use of a time limit of "two weeks" for taking action, a deadline which does usually not come to fruition. He has used such a time period in statements about Ukraine and Russia, Iran, and tariffs. The habit has been observed since Trump's first term, and has originated video compilations of the phrase, pronounced in multiple circumstances.

Jen Psaki criticised "a number of the nation's largest newspapers" for having taken "the words of the Trump administration at face value and spit them right back out to the American public without context, without much of anything", because "'I'll get to it in two weeks' is one of Donald Trump's absolute favorite tactics. He literally uses it all the time (...) And honestly, it's a bit maddening that this tactic can still spark headlines." Sam Stein of The Bulwark noted that the "two weeks" time frame is also incorporated in some of Trump's executive orders, in which he gave states and agencies 14 days to "get things done."

This tendency of Trump to set "two weeks" deadlines and not fulfill them led the media to link the phrase to the TACO acronym.

Trump's use of "two weeks" in the days leading up to the strikes on Iran was characterized by retired Brigadier General John Teichert as the President being "very intentional about being ambiguous". The Atlantic called it a "smoke screen", and Jonathan Lemire characterized it as a "deliberate feint."

The Hindustan Times noted that in 2002 Trump had appeared in a movie called Two Weeks Notice.

== "Sir" and "crying men" stories ==
Media and fact checkers (specifically, Daniel Dale) describe Trump's "sir" stories as a specific sign for unverifiable or demonstrably false anecdotes, which many times develop as follows: a "big, strong, tough" man (such as military officers, blue-collar workers, or chief executive officers; people who supposedly never cry) approaches Trump, calls him "sir" with tears in his eyes, and expresses profound gratitude for a policy or action. Occasionally, Trump has used crying as a "weapon of shame" against political adversaries. Media and late-night shows have produced compilations and parodies of "sir" and "crying men" stories.

Examples of debunked "sir" and "crying men" stories are:

- In January and June 2019, Trump claimed that in a 2017 event involving farmers and ranchers, they wept with gratitude when he signed an executive order to rescind a water regulation. He described a "strong, tough" man who purportedly had not cried even as a baby, but approached him saying, "Sir, you gave me back my life." Footage showed that while people were present at the event, nobody was crying.
- In August 2025, Trump claimed that Maryland Governor Wes Moore approached him and said, "Sir, you're the greatest president of my lifetime." The encounter was recorded by a Fox News documentary crew; the footage showed that Governor Moore did not say anything resembling the quote. Despite the evidence, Trump later repeated the claim, falsely asserting that the cameras had "caught" Moore saying it.

== Cheating at golf ==
Trump's cheating at golf has been described in detail by sportswriter Rick Reilly, who in his 2019 book Commander in Cheat: How Golf Explains Trump notes that Trump cheats and also makes false claims about his performance. Other false claims about Trump's play have been reported by the media.

Relatedly, at least since 2011, Trump criticized President Obama’s golfing habits and his trips to Hawaii on Air Force One to play golf. Trump promised that when he became president, he wouldn’t spend time golfing. Media and fact-checkers have declared that, as president, Trump has spent more time and tax money on golf than Obama. Furthermore, Obama used to play at Joint Base Andrews, near Washington, D.C., which he reached by motorcade, while Trump uses Air Force One to travel to his properties in Florida, New Jersey, Scotland, and Ireland.

== Public opinion ==
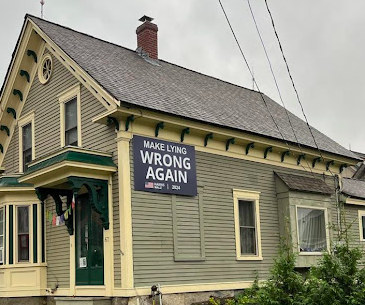
A house in Goffstown, New Hampshire displays a sign endorsing Kamala Harris in the 2024 Presidential Election which parodies "Make America Great Again" as "Make Lying Wrong Again" in response to Trump's record of misinformation.

A June 2019 Gallup poll found that 34% of American adults think Trump "is honest and trustworthy". In July 2026, an Economist/YouGov found that the number of American who would describe Trump as “honest and trustworthy” had declined to 28%.

A March 2020 Kaiser Family Foundation poll estimated that 19% of Democrats and 88% of Republicans trusted Trump to provide reliable information on COVID-19.

A May 2020 SRSS poll for CNN concluded that 36% of people in the U.S. trusted Trump on information about the COVID-19 outbreak: 4% of Democrats compared to 84% of Republicans.

In April 2022, Trump stated at a rally in Selma, North Carolina: "I think I'm the most honest human being, perhaps, that God ever created", prompting laughter from the crowd.

In two 2023 polls, Trump was thought to be "honest" by 29% of respondents (March 2023; a low since Quinnipiac University first asked this question of registered voters in November 2016) and 36% of respondents (November 2023; George Washington University Politics Poll).

In a September 2024 Associated Press/NORC at the University of Chicago survey, a majority (57%) of Americans believed that claims from Trump and his campaign are "rarely" or "never" based on facts.

Pew Research Center polling between November 2024 and April 2026 found that the share of Americans who say Trump "keeps his promises" declined from 51% to 38%, and the share who describe him as "honest" declined from 42% to 34%.

== See also ==
- Battery theory
- Opinion polling on the first Trump presidency
- Opinion polling on the second Trump presidency
- Pathological lying
- Post-truth politics
- Reality distortion field
- Trump derangement syndrome
- Trumpism
- Truth sandwich
- Veracity of statements by Boris Johnson

== Sources ==
- Blair, Gwenda (2000). Donald Trump: Master Apprentice. New York City: Simon & Schuster. pp. 138–139. ISBN 0743275101.
- Chang, Sena (January 24, 2025). "From Princeton to the Pentagon: The many faces of Pete Hegseth '03". The Daily Princetonian. Archived from the original on January 25, 2025.
- Hauslohner, Abigail; Goodwin, Liz; Kornfield, Meryl (January 25, 2025). "Pete Hegseth confirmed as defense secretary after Vance breaks tie". The Washington Post. Archived from the original on January 24, 2025.
- Trump, Donald J.; Schwartz, Tony (1987). Trump: The Art of the Deal. New York City: Random House. ISBN 9780394555287.
