= False or misleading statements by Donald Trump (between terms) =

Between his terms as president of the United States, Donald Trump made several false or misleading claims.

== Refusal to accept 2020 election loss ==
CNN fact checker Daniel Dale reported that through June 9, 2021, Trump had issued 132 written statements since leaving office, of which "a third have included lies about the election", more than any other subject.

At 2 am on Wednesday, November 4, 2020, with the election results still unclear, Trump held a press conference at the White House in which he stated: "This is a fraud on the American public. This is an embarrassment to our country. We were getting ready to win this election. Frankly, we did win this election." The statement was condemned almost immediately. The statement was also described as having been months in the making. At 9 am on Thursday, November 5, 2020, Trump tweeted "STOP THE COUNT!" However, at that time Biden was already leading in enough states such that stopping the count would have resulted in a Biden victory. After all major news organizations declared Biden the President-elect on November 7, Trump refused to accept his loss, declaring "this election is far from over" and alleging election fraud without providing evidence. Privately, according to reporting by Maggie Haberman, he told one aide "I'm just not going to leave", and he told another aide, "We're never leaving. How can you leave when you won an election?"

== 2021 California gubernatorial recall election ==
Before the 2021 California gubernatorial recall election, Trump claimed without evidence that the election was "probably rigged" and said, "Does anybody really believe the California recall election isn't rigged?" After polls closed, he said there was "rigged voting".

== COVID-19 healthcare discrimination against white people ==
In reference to a New York policy that allows race to be a consideration when dispensing oral antiviral treatments, Trump lied at a rally that white people don't get the vaccine and "have to go to the back of the line" for COVID-19 care.

== Spygate conspiracy theory ==
In a new iteration of the Spygate conspiracy theory, in February 2022, Trump falsely claimed Hillary Clinton spied on him during the Russia investigation.

== Drop boxes in the 2020 presidential election in Wisconsin ==
Following a Wisconsin Supreme Court ruling declaring ballot drop boxes illegal, Trump claimed this ruling retroactively applies to the 2020 presidential election in Wisconsin. He also suggested he was the legitimate winner of that election.

== Federal prosecution (government documents case) ==
Declassification of documents

There doesn't have to be a process, as I understand it. You're the president of the United States, you can declassify just by saying it's declassified, even by thinking about it. ... In other words, when I left the White House, they were declassified."

— Donald Trump on September 21, 2022
Interview with Fox News

Following the FBI search of Mar-a-Lago in August 2022, Trump made false, misleading, unsubstantiated, and contradictory claims about the investigation into his handling of classified material. Among these, he suggested, without evidence, that President Biden played a role in the search, the FBI planted evidence, the search was unnecessary, and the classified documents in his possession were already declassified. He stated that as a US president, he was not required to follow the prescribed legal process, but could simply declassify them just "by thinking about it", and "because you're sending it to Mar-a-Lago or wherever you're sending it. There doesn't have to be a process. There can be a process, but there doesn't have to be."

On June 8, 2023, a grand jury indicted Trump. The 37th count was for "False statements and representations", specifically alleging that Trump hid documents from his own attorney, Evan Corcoran. The government had subpoenaed Trump for any classified documents he might have, so Corcoran searched the boxes for documents with classified markings. Because Trump deliberately misled him, Corcoran drafted a "sworn certification" that all subpoenaed documents had been returned, and another attorney, Christina Bobb, provided it to "the grand jury and the FBI". On June 27, 2023, responding to the revelation that in 2021 he showed off a classified document and told the writers in the room to "look" at it, Trump described his own audiotaped words as "bravado, if you want to know the truth... I was talking and just holding up papers... but I had no documents."

== Federal prosecution (2020 election case) ==
The August 1, 2023 indictment listed 21 election-related lies Trump told.

== Claim of intervening in 2018 Florida vote count ==
On November 10, 2022, Trump alleged that Democrats had perpetrated "ballot theft" four years earlier in the Florida gubernatorial election. He claimed that, as president, he had intervened to support Republican candidate Ron DeSantis over his Democratic rival Andrew Gillum. "I sent in the FBI and the U.S. Attorneys", Trump claimed, when it seemed that DeSantis had been "running out of the votes necessary to win." Trump said he had thereby "fixed" the DeSantis campaign. Gillum filed in court to demand further information from Trump, as it sounded like an admission of wrongdoing; meanwhile, Florida's Broward County elections office denied that any such thing had happened during the 2018 election. The FBI said in March 2023 that it had no records to support Trump's claim.

== 2022 announcement speech ==
On November 15, 2022, almost two years in advance of the 2024 election, Trump announced his candidacy for a second term as president. His announcement speech at Mar-a-Lago was "full of exaggerated and false talking points" and at least "20 false and misleading claims", uttering the first inaccurate claim "about two minutes in and a few minutes later, tick(ing) off at least four hyperbolic claims about his own accomplishments". The New York Times Fact Check stated that "Mr. Trump repeated many familiar exaggerations about his own achievements, reiterated misleading attacks on political opponents and made dire assessments that were at odds with reality."

Trump's first inaccurate claim, about two minutes in, was that his administration "built the greatest economy in the history of the world", a claim that was inaccurate even for recent American history. Trump wrongly claimed Americans surrendered $85 billion worth of military equipment to the Taliban in the Afghanistan withdrawal; the Defense Department estimate was $7.1 billion, some which was rendered inoperable before the withdrawal. Trump claimed that his administration "filled up" the Strategic Petroleum Reserve but that under Biden it has been "virtually drained"; in fact, the reserve was not "virtually drained" under Biden, and it actually contained less when Trump left office than when he took office. He falsely claimed that climate scientists "say the ocean will rise 1/8 of an inch over the next 200 to 300 years"; NOAA estimated average sea level rise along the U.S. coastline will be 10–12 inches in the next 30 years.

Speaking of border crossings by undocumented aliens, he said "I believe it's 10 million people coming in, not three or four million people", a claim for which there is no empirical basis. Likewise, his claim that the U.S.-Mexico border had been "erased" since Biden was sworn in, was also baseless. Trump falsely heralded completion of his border wall; in fact, the vast majority of the "new" barriers reinforced or replaced existing structures, and only about 47 miles were new primary barriers along the 1,900-mile border.

Trump said "I've gone decades, decades without a war, the first president to do it for that long a period"; however, he presided over U.S. involvement in wars in Afghanistan, Iraq and Syria, and was commander-in-chief for dozens of U.S. airstrikes. He claimed that when he began his term the U.S. had jet fighters that were 48 years old (and) bombers that were 60 years old—but not anymore"; in fact, the military continues to use B-52 bombers that are being outfitted with new Rolls-Royce engines to prolong their life even further. Trump was wrong in claiming that the U.S. takes longer than "any" country to count votes, belied by longer times in Indonesia (more than a month in 2019), Afghanistan (five months after a September 2019 vote), and Bosnia (weeks in fall 2022).

== 2023 CNN town hall ==
During the May 10, 2023 CNN Republican Town Hall, Trump repeated his false claims about the 2020 presidential election, the January 6 Capitol attack and his handling of classified documents. He also falsely claimed he had never met E. Jean Carroll and that the jury in her lawsuit against him had ruled that "he didn't rape her". Trump also falsely claimed that Brazil had seen a significant decline in gun-related violence after loosening its gun laws; criminologists consulted by The Washington Post cited an aging population, investment in policing and recessions in drug cartel conflicts as more likely explanations for the decline. He also promoted false claims about aid given to Ukraine for Russia's invasion, abortion and the economy during his presidency.

== 2024 presidential campaign ==
To sow election doubt, Trump escalated use of "rigged election" and "election interference" statements in advance of the 2024 election compared to the previous two elections—the statements described as part of a "heads I win; tails you cheated" rhetorical strategy.

During his 2024 presidential campaign, Trump has made numerous false and misleading statements. The large amount of lies and false statements have been attributed to Trump's rhetorical style described as using the big lie and firehose of falsehood propaganda technique. During a 64 minute news conference on August 8, 2024, NPR counted Trump making over 162 "misstatements, exaggerations and outright lies" averaging more than two per minute. They described the amount of Trump's lies as "stunning" and "beyond the bounds of what most politicians would do". CNN has called Trump's claims a "bombardment of dishonesty" and a "campaign of relentless lying". The Washington Post has described Trump's speeches as a "bacchanalia of lies and mistruths".

== False and misleading statements by topic ==
=== 2024 presidential election ===
Trump has made a variety of false claims aimed at sowing doubt in the election's integrity and setting up an election challenge should he lose the 2024 presidential election. He has repeatedly said that he can only lose the election through cheating, that it was "unconstitutional" for the Democratic party to make Kamala Harris the nominee, that all of the legal cases against him constitute election interference organized by Biden and Harris, and that extensive voter fraud is occurring, including through non-citizen voting, mail-in ballots, and early voting.

=== Immigration and crime ===
In March and April 2023, on several occasions, Trump claimed that all the psychiatric patients in an unnamed "South American country" had been sent to the United States; he said he had "read a story" in which an unnamed "psychologist or psychiatrist" in that country said all his patients had disappeared. When CNN asked the Trump campaign to substantiate this, a spokesperson responded by providing unrelated information. Trump has repeated this assertion throughout his campaign, falsely stating that foreign leaders are deliberately emptying insane asylums to send "prisoners, murderers, drug dealers, mental patients, terrorists" across America's southern border as migrants.

Trump has made false claims of a "migrant crime wave" that are not supported by national data. He claimed that "13,000 convicted murderers" had entered the U.S. during the Biden-Harris administration and "freely and openly roam" the country, when that number is for immigrants who'd committed a variety of crimes and entered the country during several administrations, many of whom are jailed. Trump has falsely claimed that crime in several South American countries has decreased because their leaders are sending criminals into the United States. Trump has painted America as violent and crime-ridden on the campaign trail. Trump has falsely stated that FBI statistics showing that homicides have dropped by 6% in 2022 and 13% in 2023 are "a lie". Trump has repeatedly claimed that crime in America is only going up. In reality, crime is going down. Trump falsely alleged that immigrants commit crimes because they have "bad genes", invoking what science writer Daniel Vergano describes as "the deeply dishonest scientism" of eugenics.

Trump has falsely claimed America "had the most secure border" when he was President. In reality, illegal immigration was higher than it was during both of Obama's terms. Trump has falsely claimed that illegal immigration has only increased under the Biden administration. In reality, by June 2024, illegal immigration reached a three-year low and decreased to levels not seen since September 2020 when Trump was in office.

Trump has falsely claimed that 107% of jobs are taken by illegal immigrants. In reality, native-born Americans have gained more jobs than illegal immigrants during Biden's administration. The 107% makes no mathematical sense. Research has repeatedly found that illegal immigrants do not depress wages or take jobs from Americans.

Trump has falsely claimed that immigrants take social security benefits and are decreasing the life of the program. In reality, immigrants cannot take social security benefits but pay taxes, thus increasing the life of the program.

The Bulwark uploaded a satirical video showing and debunking clips of Trump blaming migrants for "all problems", including "hurricane damage, bribery prosecutions, veteran homelessness, missing pets, and, the decline of little league baseball."

=== Global warming and climate change ===
...not our problem

When people talk about global warming, I say the ocean is going to go down 100th of an inch within the next 400 years. That's not our problem.

— Presidential candidate Donald Trump,
September 2024

Trump's opposition to wind power involves repeated claims that "windmills" "kill the birds", but cats in the U.S. actually kill on the order of 10,000 times as many birds as wind turbines.

Trump has "routinely" dismissed climate change. In 2012, Trump tweeted that "global warming was created by and for the Chinese in order to make U.S. manufacturing non-competitive". In December 2013, he tweeted that "I'm in Los Angeles and it's freezing. Global warming is a total, and very expensive, hoax!"—conflating global climate and local weather. In January 2016 Trump told Fox News that he had been joking in the China tweet, but in a September 2016 presidential election debate he altogether denied having said the content of the tweet.

In 2018, Trump told 60 Minutes that he does not believe that climate change is a hoax, but that "it'll change back again". Similarly, during the 2020 California wildfires, Trump assured that "It'll start getting cooler, you just watch. [...] I don't think science knows, actually"—without justifying how he knew that things would get cooler but that scientists did not know things would get warmer. While campaigning in September 2024, Trump said, "when people talk about global warming, I say the ocean is going to go down 100th of an inch within the next 400 years. That's not our problem"; in fact the IPCC forecast in 2019 that, even with significantly lower greenhouse gas emissions, the average sea level will rise 0.3 metres (0.98 ft) to 0.6 metres (2.0 ft) by 2100.

During his campaign speeches, Trump erroneously asserted that the Biden administration was in the process of converting U.S. Army tanks into electrically powered vehicles.

=== Foreign policy ===
In rallies and interviews, Trump has repeatedly asserted that multiple events since the 2020 election would not have happened if he had won the election, those being the 2023 October 7 attacks on Israel and the 2022 Russian invasion of Ukraine. Experts have stated that such events likely would still have happened even if Trump won the 2020 election. Jonathan Schanzer of the Foundation for Defense of Democracies and Natan Sachs, the director of the Center for Middle East Policy at the Brookings Institution have stated that there was no Trump-era policy that would have stopped the Hamas attack on Israel. Scholars have also estimated that Russia's invasion of Ukraine would likely still have occurred and that Trump's statements towards NATO and Russia would likely have made an initial unified response to the Russian invasion "implausible" and may have resulted in an early Russian victory.

In October 2024, Trump suggested in an interview with Hugh Hewitt that he had visited the Gaza Strip; there was no record of him visiting Gaza. A Trump campaign aide later acknowledged that he had visited Israel, but incorrectly stated that "Gaza is in Israel."

=== Healthcare ===
Trump has falsely claimed that he was responsible for lowering insulin costs to $35 for those on Medicare, and has falsely claimed that Biden is taking credit for his accomplishment. Trump has falsely claimed that he was responsible for the VA Choice law passed by Obama.

=== Abortion ===
Trump has falsely claimed that Democratic states are passing laws to allow executing babies after birth.

==== Roe v. Wade ====
At various times in 2024, Trump has claimed that everyone wanted Roe v. Wade to be overturned, including all legal scholars and people throughout the political spectrum. Legal scholar Kimberly Mutcherson called the assertion "mind-numbingly false" and other legal scholars concur. Similarly, many polls have shown that the majority of Americans did not want Roe overturned.

=== LGBTQ claims ===
Trump has falsely claimed that schools are secretly sending children to have sex-change surgeries.

=== Indictments ===
On July 18, 2023, Trump said in an Iowa speech that, before he was indicted on 88 felony charges, "I didn't know practically what a subpoena was and grand juries and all of this—now I'm like becoming an expert." (He and his businesses had been involved in over 4,000 legal cases even before he was elected president seven years earlier.) He also suggested he was facing jail time for having "sa[id] something about an election", whereas the charges had to do with attempts to overturn it.

In August 2023, 27 of Trump's falsehoods about the 2020 election were listed in his Georgia indictment.

=== Music Modernization Act ===
On February 11, 2024, Trump claimed on Truth Social that he "signed and was responsible" for the 2018 Music Modernization Act. Dina LaPolt, an entertainment attorney who helped advance the law, told Variety "Trump did nothing on [the] legislation except sign it, and doesn't even know what the Music Modernization Act does."

=== Real vs. AI-generated images ===
On August 7, Vice President Kamala Harris arrived at Detroit Metropolitan Airport for a rally, where she was received by a large crowd. On August 11, Trump posted claims on social media that the crowd was not real, but AI-generated: "Trump (...) made the fabricated claim that Harris had been "turned in" by an airport maintenance worker who "noticed the fake crowd picture." He then said Harris should be "disqualified" from the 2024 election "because the creation of a fake image is ELECTION INTERFERENCE. Anyone who does that will cheat at ANYTHING!""

These claims generated responses from fact-checkers, news outlets, and technology-related articles debunking him, eliciting opinions and discussions about Trump's mental state. When later asked about these claims, while Trump did not concede that the crowd in Michigan was real, he did not say again that the images were AI-generated: "Well, I can't say what was there, who was there. I can only tell you about ours. We have the biggest crowds ever in the history of politics (...)"

Shortly thereafter, Trump himself would post several AI-generated images and videos on social media, which showed him dancing with Elon Musk, falsely suggested that he had been endorsed by singer-songwriter Taylor Swift and her fans, and depicted Kamala Harris speaking at a communist rally; many of these images were posted ahead of the first day of the 2024 Democratic National Convention. When later asked whether he was worried that Taylor Swift would sue him, Trump stated: "I don't know anything about them, other than somebody else generated them." Swift would later endorse Harris in the general election.

=== Hurricane Helene ===
CNN and PBS NewsHour reported in the aftermath of the September 2024 hurricane that Trump had engaged in several days of spreading lies, distortions, disinformation and conspiracy theories about the federal response, which public officials said created confusion and hindered recovery efforts. Among the false claims were that Biden wouldn't take calls from Georgia's governor; that Harris had stolen Federal Emergency Management Agency funds to house undocumented migrants; that the Biden administration was providing only $750 to people whose homes had been destroyed by the hurricane; and that no attempts had been made to rescue people.

== Events ==
=== Biden vs. Trump presidential debate ===
On June 27, 2024, Biden and Trump debated in Atlanta. Fact-checking found that both debaters had made false or misleading statements, with most of them adjudicated to Trump.

=== Speech at the Republican Convention ===
On July 18, 2024, the fourth day of the Republican Convention (Milwaukee), Trump addressed the audience at accepting the nomination. Fact-checking found he made several false statements.

=== CPAC Speech ===
In what CNN described as a "lie-filled CPAC speech" in February 2024, Trump repeated false claims about the 2020 election and the border wall.

=== NABJ interview ===
On July 31, 2024, Trump was interviewed at the National Association of Black Journalists annual convention, in Chicago. According to fact-checkers, he made several false statements.

Statements that caused special controversy were one about immigrants: "Coming from the border are millions and millions of people that happen to be taking Black jobs", and one about Kamala Harris: "I've known her a long time indirectly, not directly very much. And she was always of Indian heritage, and she was only promoting Indian heritage. I didn't know she was Black until a number of years ago, when she happened to turn Black, and now she wants to be known as Black. So, I don't know, is she Indian or is she Black?". Harris has always identified as both Indian-American and Black, attended Howard University (an historically Black university), and was a member of Alpha Kappa Alpha, a historically Black sorority.

=== Mar-a-Lago news conference ===
On August 8, 2024, Trump gave a news conference at his Mar-a-Lago residence, that NPR fact-checked and reported to contain "at least 162 misstatements, exaggerations and outright lies in 64 minutes." Other fact-checkers also discussed the falsehoods.

Two claims that drawn attention were that his January 6 crowd had been bigger than Martin Luther King Jr.'s attendance to his "great speech", and, the story about having been in a helicopter flight with former San Francisco Mayor Willie Brown, where Mr. Brown told him "terrible things" about Kamala Harris, and which ended in an emergency landing. It was discussed whether Trump had confused Willie Brown with former California Governor Jerry Brown, but Politico established that the Trump's helicopter flight that ended in an emergency landing happened in 1990, having as passengers former city councilmember and state senator from Los Angeles Nate Holden, Barbara Res, Robert Trump, and attorney Harvey Freedman. There was no mention of Harris in that occasion.

=== Elon Musk interview ===
On August 12, Elon Musk interviewed Donald Trump via X Spaces. The conversation start was delayed by technical issues; it was listened to live by an audience calculated in more than a million people. Trump's campaign claimed that a billion people had listened to the conversation.

Fact-checking found multiple and familiar false or misleading statements.

=== Howell, Michigan speech ===
In a campaign speech in Howell, Michigan, on August 20, 2024, Trump falsely accused Harris of a "vicious, violent overthrow" in replacing Biden as the Democratic presidential nominee. After Biden voluntarily resigned under political pressure, his replacement followed Democratic Party rules and was without violence. Trump also repeated a false claim that no one was killed in the January 6 United States Capitol attack. Trump incorrectly attributed reclassification of some state crimes to Harris (who as Attorney General of California did not have the power to do so), including those reclassified by voters in 2014 California Proposition 47.

=== Harris vs. Trump presidential debate ===
On September 10, 2024, Harris and Trump debated in Philadelphia. During the debate, differently from what CNN did in the previous debate with Joe Biden, the moderators fact-checked live several of Trump's claims. Fact-checkers found that Trump made many false or misleading statements, while Harris made one false statement, and several misleading statements.

Among other false claims, Trump repeated a debunked hoax spread by neo-Nazi groups, right-wing politicians and media figures that immigrants were eating pets in Springfield, Ohio. Moderator David Muir debunked it again on the spot. On September 11, Trump called into Fox & Friends and suggested ABC News should lose its broadcasting license because the moderators fact-checked him. The claim that the moderators' fact-checking demonstrated the debate was rigged against Trump was also spread by his supporters, and itself fact-checked.

On September 18, at Fox News' show Gutfeld!, Trump claimed that the debate's audience had gone "crazy" about him being fact-checked, despite the debate having no live audience; it was unclear whether he was meaning the TV ratings or the TV audience.

== See also ==
- False or misleading statements by Donald Trump (first term)
- False or misleading statements by Donald Trump (second term)
