= False or misleading statements by Donald Trump (first term) =

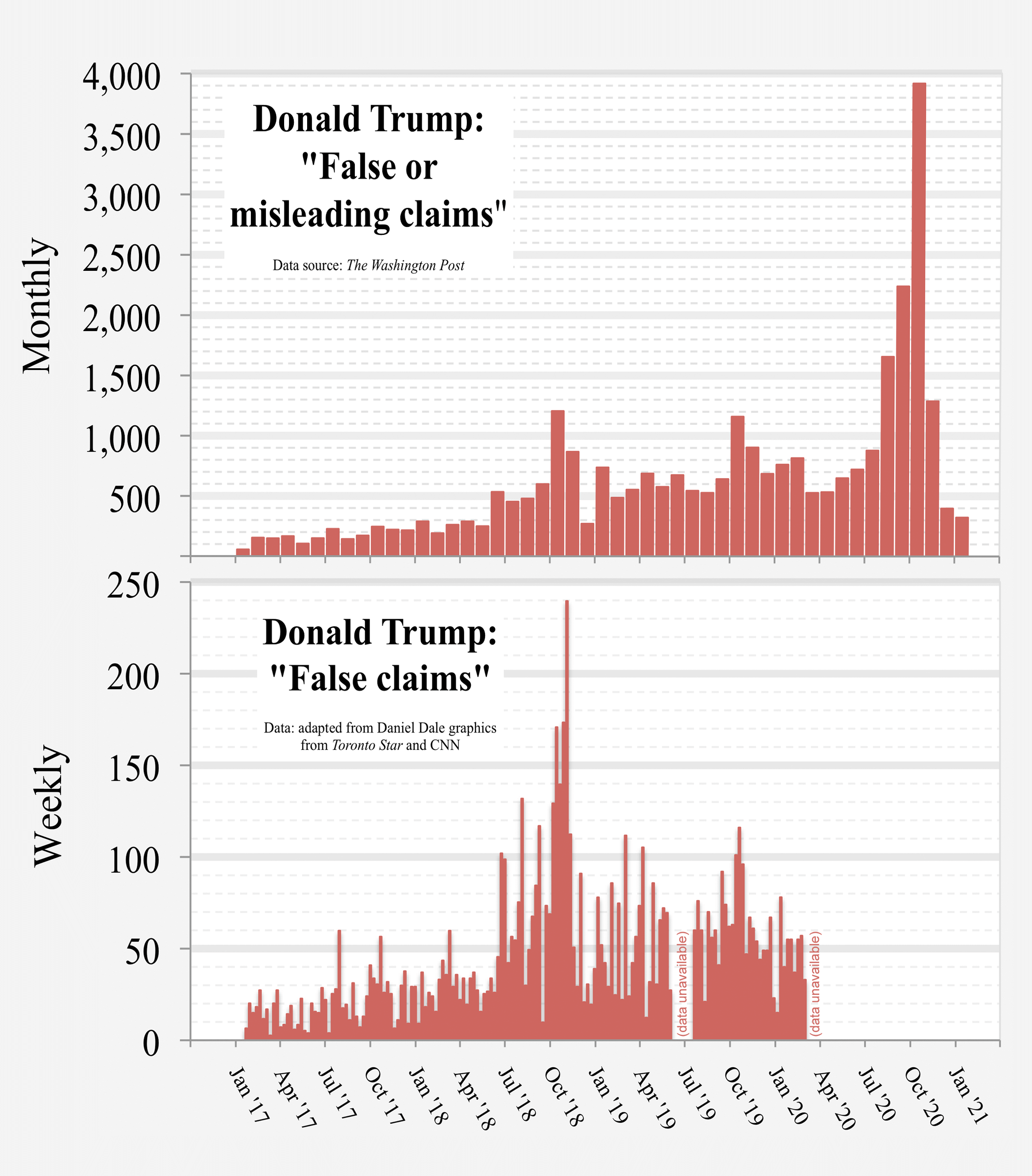
Fact-checkers from The Washington Post (top, monthly), the Toronto Star and CNN (bottom, weekly) compiled data on "false or misleading claims" and "false claims", respectively. The peaks corresponded in late 2018 to the midterm elections, in late 2019 to his impeachment inquiry, and in late 2020 to the presidential election. The Post reported 30,573 false or misleading claims in four years, an average of more than 20.9 per day.

During his first term as President of the United States, Donald Trump made tens of thousands of false or misleading claims.

During the first two-and-a-half years (January 2017–June 2019), the Toronto Star tallied 5,276 false claims, an average of six per day.

Across all four years, fact-checkers at The Washington Post documented 30,573 false or misleading claims, an average of 21 per day.

== Fact-checking Trump ==
Trump's statements as president engaged a host of fact-checkers. Tony Burman wrote: "The falsehoods and distortions uttered by Trump and his senior officials have particularly inflamed journalists and have been challenged—resulting in a growing prominence of 'fact-checkers' and investigative reporting." The situation got worse, as described by Pulitzer Prize-winning Ashley Parker: "President Trump seems to be saying more and more things that aren't true."

Glenn Kessler said in 2017 as a fact-checker for The Washington Post there was no comparison between Trump and other politicians. Kessler gave his worst rating to other politicians 20% of the time, but gave it to Trump 64% of the time. Kessler wrote that Trump was the most fact-challenged politician he had ever encountered and lamented that "the pace and volume of the president's misstatements means that we cannot possibly keep up". Kessler and others have described how Trump's lying has created an alternate reality. David Zurawik says we should "just assume Trump's always lying and fact check him backwards" because that's "how to cover a habitual liar".

The Washington Post fact-checker created a new category of falsehoods in 2018, the "Bottomless Pinocchio", for falsehoods repeated at least twenty times (so often "that there can be no question the politician is aware his or her facts are wrong"). Trump was the only politician who met the standard of the category, with 14 statements that immediately qualified. According to The Washington Post, Trump repeated some falsehoods so many times he had effectively engaged in disinformation. Glenn Kessler wrote:

The president keeps going long after the facts are clear, in what appears to be a deliberate effort to replace the truth with his own, far more favorable, version of it. He is not merely making gaffes or misstating things, he is purposely injecting false information into the national conversation.

Professor Robert Prentice summarized the views of many fact-checkers:

Here's the problem: As fact checker Glenn Kessler noted in August, whereas [Hillary] Clinton lies as much as the average politician, President Donald Trump's lying is "off the charts." No prominent politician in memory bests Trump for spouting spectacular, egregious, easily disproved lies. The birther claim. The vote fraud claim. The attendance at the inauguration claim. And on and on and on. Every fact checker – Kessler, Factcheck.org, Snopes.com, PolitiFact – finds a level of mendacity unequaled by any politician ever scrutinized. For instance, 70 percent of his campaign statements checked by PolitiFact were mostly false, totally false, or "pants on fire" false.

At the end of 2018, Kessler provided a run-down summary of Trump's accelerating rate of false statements during the year:

Trump began 2018 on a similar pace as last year. Through May, he generally averaged about 200 to 250 false claims a month. But his rate suddenly exploded in June, when he topped 500 falsehoods, as he appeared to shift to campaign mode. He uttered almost 500 more in both July and August, almost 600 in September, more than 1,200 in October and almost 900 in November. In December, Trump drifted back to the mid-200s.

Several major fact-checking sites regularly fact-checked Trump, including:

- PolitiFact, which awarded Trump its "Lie of the Year" in 2015, 2017 and 2019.
- FactCheck.org, which dubbed Trump the "King of Whoppers" in 2015.
- The Washington Post said in January 2020 that Trump had made more than 16,241 false or misleading claims as president, an average of about 15 such statements per day.
- The Toronto Star which said that, as of June 2019, Trump had made 5,276 false statements since his inauguration.

As late as June 2018, the news media were debating whether to use the word "lie" to describe Trump's falsehoods. That month, however, many news organizations, including CNN, Financial Times, Los Angeles Times, Chicago Tribune, The New Yorker, and Foreign Policy began describing some of Trump's false statements as lies. The Toronto Star was one of the first outlets to use the word "lie" to describe Trump's statements, and continues to frequently. Some organizations continue to shy away from the term.

On June 5, 2019, Paul Farhi wrote that Glenn Kessler, author of The Washington Post's "Fact Checker" column, had used the word lie only once to describe Trump's statements, although he has sometimes used other terminology that implies lying. Since then, The Washington Post's fact-checking team has written the 2020 book Donald Trump and His Assault on Truth: The President's Falsehoods, Misleading Claims and Flat-Out Lies.

By October 9, 2019, The Washington Post's fact-checking team documented that Trump had "made 13,435 false or misleading claims over 993 days". On October 18, 2019, the Washington Post Fact Checker newsletter described the situation:

A thousand days of Trump.
We often hear from readers wondering how President Trump's penchant for falsehoods stacks up in comparison to previous presidents. But there is no comparison: Trump exists in a league of his own. Deception, misdirection, gaslighting, revisionism, absurd boasts, and in some cases, provable lies, are core to his politics.

After departing the White House, January 20, 2021, Trump gave a farewell address at Joint Base Andrews in Maryland prior to departing on Air Force One for his residence in Palm Beach, Florida. The AP fact-checked his speech, and reported that it included false statements about his presidency and administration's accomplishments. These included statements that he passed the largest tax cuts in history; that the U.S. economy during his tenure was the greatest in U.S. history; that he achieved record job creation; that his administration rebuilt both the U.S. military and the American manufacturing industry; that he destroyed the ISIS caliphate; and a reiteration of his previously repeated falsehood that he, and not former President Barack Obama, had passed the Veterans Choice Act. These falsehoods added to the 30,573 falsehoods that The Washington Post's fact-checker had tallied by the end of Trump's presidency, an average of 21 falsehoods a day.

Scholarly analysis of Trump's tweets found "significant evidence" of an intent to deceive:

Analyzing Trump's tweets with a regression function designed to predict true and false claims based on their language and composition, it finds significant evidence of intent underlying most of Trump's false claims, and makes the case for calling them lies when that outcome agrees with the results of traditional fact-checking procedures.... We argue, based on our findings here, that intent to deceive is a reasonable inference from most of Trump's false tweets, and that drawing that conclusion when the evidence warrants could help scholars and journalists alike better explain the strategic functions of political falsehoods.

== Credibility polling ==
According to a September 2018 CNN-SSRS poll of 1,003 respondents, only 32% percent found Trump honest and trustworthy, the worst read in CNN polling history. The number was 33% on election day, November 8, 2016. In June 2020, a Gallup poll of 1,034 adults within the U.S. found that 36% found Trump honest and trustworthy. By comparison, 60% of respondents found President Obama honest and trustworthy in June 2012 during his re-election campaign.

== Re-election campaign ==
During the Trump's re-election campaign, he defended his actions and criticized the media. At a rally in February 2017, he referred to a nonexistent incident ("last night in Sweden ...") while criticizing the asylum policies of several European countries. After backlash from the press and the Swedish government, Trump said he was referring to a Fox News program aired the previous day.

== Commentary and analysis ==
As president, Trump frequently made false statements in public speeches and remarks. Trump uttered "at least one false or misleading claim per day on 91 of his first 99 days" in office according to The New York Times, and 1,318 total in his first 263 days in office according to the "Fact Checker" political analysis column of The Washington Post. By the Post's tally, it took Trump 601 days to reach 5,000 false or misleading statements and another 226 days to reach the 10,000 mark. For the seven weeks leading up to the midterm elections, it rose to an average of 30 per day from 4.9 during his first 100 days in office. The Post found that Trump averaged 15 false statements per day during 2018.

The New York Times editorial board frequently lambasted Trump's dishonesty. In September 2018, the board called him "a president with no clear relation to the truth". The following month, the board published an opinion piece titled, "Donald Trump Is Lyin' Up a Storm".

James Comey had frequent discussions with Trump, and in his first major interview after his firing he described Trump as a serial liar who tells "baffling, unnecessary" falsehoods:

Sometimes he's lying in ways that are obvious, sometimes he's saying things that we may not know are true or false and then there's a spectrum in between ... he is someone who is—for whom the truth is not a high value.

The Washington Post commentator Greg Sargent pointed out eight instances where government officials either repeated falsehoods or came up with misleading information to support falsehoods asserted by Trump, including various false claims about terrorists crossing or attempting to cross the Mexican border, that a 10% middle class tax cut had been passed, and a doctored video justifying Jim Acosta's removal from the White House press room.

James P. Pfiffner, writing for The Evolving American Presidency book series, wrote that compared to previous presidents, Trump tells "vastly" more "conventional lies" that politicians usually tell to avoid criticism or improve their image. However, Pfiffner emphasized that "the most significant" lies told by Trump are instead "egregious false statements that are demonstrably contrary to well-known facts", because by causing disagreements about what the facts are, then people cannot properly evaluate their government: "Political power rather than rational discourse then becomes the arbiter."

Selman Özdan, writing in the journal Postdigital Science and Education, describes that "many" of Trump's statements in interviews or on Twitter "may now be classed as bullshit", with their utter disregard for the truth, and their focus on telling "a version of reality that suits Trump's aims". She added that these statements are "often" written in a way which criticizes or mocks others, while offering a misleading version of Trump's accomplishments to improve his image.

Daniel Dale, writing for The Washington Post, described fact-checking Trump as being "like fact-checking one of those talking dolls programmed to say the same phrases for eternity, except if none of those phrases were true", noting that Trump had repeatedly and falsely claimed that he had passed the Veterans Choice Act and that U.S. Steel was building six, seven, eight or nine plants (the company had invested in two existing plants). Dale added: "Many of Trump's false claims are so transparently wrong that I can fact-check them with a Google search." In 2019, Dale noted that Trump had a tendency to use large inaccurate numbers instead of smaller accurate ones.

Susan Glasser wrote that falsehoods are "part of his political identity" and quoted Glenn Kessler's description of them as "Trump's political 'secret sauce'". She described how "The White House assault on the truth is not an accident—it is intentional." When comparing Trump to Richard Nixon, she quoted Barry Goldwater, who described Nixon as "the most dishonest individual I ever met in my life", but she did not stop there. She spoke to Morton Halperin "who oversaw the writing of the Pentagon Papers and then served on Nixon's National Security Council staff... Halperin insisted, strongly, that Nixon wasn't nearly as damaging to the institution of the Presidency as Trump has been. 'He's far worse than Nixon,' Halperin told me, 'certainly as a threat to the country'."

=== Purpose and effect ===
Google Trends topic searches for "gaslighting" began a substantial increase in about 2016, around the time of the campaign for the U.S. presidential election. Numerous journalists have used the term to describe Trump's statements.

Though the term fake news was known before the 2016 election, since Trump started using it soon after the election, it has been used continuously by Trump, other leaders, political operatives, journalists and ordinary people. Trump weaponized the term as a rhetorical tool to dismiss and discredit unfavorable reporting, undercutting journalism's truth-telling function and delegitimizing journalism for a large part of the electorate.

A few days after Trump's January 20, 2017, inauguration, some experts expressed serious concerns about how Trump and his staff showed "arrogance" and "lack of respect...for the American people" by making "easily contradicted" false statements that rose to a "new level" above the "general stereotype that politicians lie". They considered the "degree of fabrication" as "simply breathtaking", egregious, and creating an "extraordinarily dangerous situation" for the country.

They elaborated on why they thought Trump and his team were so deceptive: he was using classic gaslighting in a "systematic, sophisticated attempt" as a "political weapon"; he was undermining trust and creating doubt and hatred of the media and all it reports; owning his supporters and implanting "his own version of reality" in their minds; creating confusion so people are vulnerable, don't know what to do, and thus "gain more power over them"; inflating a "sense of his own popularity"; and making people "give up trying to discern the truth".

If Donald Trump can undercut America's trust in all media, he then starts to own them and can start to literally implant his own version of reality.

== Specific topics ==
=== Inaugural crowd ===
Trump's presidency began with falsehoods originating from Trump. On the day after his inauguration, he falsely accused the media of lying about the size of the crowd. He then exaggerated the size, and White House press secretary Sean Spicer backed up his claims. When Spicer was accused of intentionally misstating the figures, Kellyanne Conway, in an interview with NBC's Chuck Todd, defended Spicer by saying he merely presented alternative facts. Todd responded by saying, "Alternative facts are not facts; they're falsehoods."

In September 2018, a government photographer admitted he, at Trump's request, edited pictures of the inauguration to make the crowd appear larger: "The photographer cropped out empty space 'where the crowd ended' for a new set of pictures requested by Trump on the first morning of his presidency, after he was angered by images showing his audience was smaller than Barack Obama's in 2009."

=== 2016 presidential election ===
Despite claims he won "in a landslide", Trump won the 2016 and 2024 elections with respectively 56.9% and 58% of the electoral college—placing the wins in approximately the 23rd and 28th percentiles of all presidential elections.

Trump claimed he won the 2016 electoral vote in a "landslide", but he ranks below most presidents in both the electoral vote (then 46th out of 58 elections; accompanying chart) and popular vote (near the bottom of all elections; shown in chart).

Trump went on to claim his electoral college victory in 2016 was a landslide; that three of the states he did not win in the 2016 election had "serious voter fraud"; and that he didn't win the popular vote because Clinton received 3–5 million illegal votes. Trump made his Trump Tower wiretapping allegations in March 2017, which the Department of Justice twice refuted. In January 2018, Trump claimed texts between FBI employees Peter Strzok and Lisa Page were tantamount to "treason", but The Wall Street Journal reviewed them and concluded they "show no evidence of a conspiracy against" Trump.

=== Denial of Russian hacking and election interference ===
Trump frequently denied or sowed doubt that Russian intelligence hacked the DNC and interfered in the 2016 election. He made many different claims, such as that there was no hacking, other countries than Russia did it, or the DNC hacked itself and that Seth Rich was involved. He has said Russia did not try to get him elected and often called allegations of Russian meddling "a hoax". "Trump is fond of tossing out conspiracy theories, even if just to add a sliver of doubt. His supporters have embraced his conspiracy theories, especially when it comes to Mueller's investigation." The Russia investigation conclusively proved Russian intelligence was behind the hackings.

Robert Mueller, who led a Special Counsel investigation, concluded Russian interference was "sweeping and systematic" and "violated U.S. criminal law", and he indicted 26 Russian citizens and 3 Russian organizations. The investigation led to indictments and convictions of Trump campaign officials and associated Americans. The Mueller report, made public in April 2019, examined contacts between the Trump campaign and Russian officials but concluded that, though the Trump campaign welcomed the Russian activities and expected to benefit from them, there was insufficient evidence to bring any conspiracy or coordination charges against Trump or associates.

=== Denial of collusion with Russia ===
Trump repeatedly claimed he and his campaign did not collude with Russia, and Republicans and many otherwise reliable sources have repeated that false claim even though Mueller said that he did not investigate "collusion", only "conspiracy" and "coordination". The claim that there was no collusion has been described as a myth.

In a January 2019 interview, Trump's attorney, Rudy Giuliani undermined Trump's claim when he "claimed Wednesday night that he 'never said there was no collusion' between President Trump's campaign and Russia leading up to the 2016 presidential election."

Giuliani: [complained about] 'false reporting' on the Russia investigation.
Cuomo: 'Mr. Mayor, false reporting is saying that nobody in the campaign had any contacts with Russia. False reporting is saying that there has been no suggestion of any kind of collusion between the campaign and any Russians.'
Giuliani: 'You just misstated my position. I never said there was no collusion between the campaign, or between people in the campaign.'
Cuomo: 'Yes, you have.'

After his comments, Giuliani made statements that NPR described as an "apparent reversal" from his TV interview: He said "'there was no collusion by President Trump in any way, shape or form' and that he had 'no knowledge of any collusion by any of the thousands of people who worked on the campaign'."

The investigation found there were at least 140 contacts between Trump or 18 of his associates with Russian nationals and WikiLeaks or their intermediaries, though the contacts were insufficient to show an illegal "conspiracy".

=== Dismissal of FBI director ===
On May 9, 2017, Trump dismissed James Comey, the director of the Federal Bureau of Investigation, saying he had accepted the recommendations of U.S. attorney general Jeff Sessions and deputy attorney general Rod Rosenstein to dismiss Comey. In their respective letters, neither Trump, Sessions nor Rosenstein mentioned the issue of an FBI investigation into the links between Trump associates and Russian officials, with Rosenstein writing that Comey should be dismissed for his handling of the conclusion of the FBI investigation into the Hillary Clinton email controversy, a rationale seconded by Sessions. On May 11, Trump said in an NBC News interview: "Regardless of recommendation, I was going to fire Comey ... in fact, when I decided to just do it, I said to myself, I said, you know, this Russia thing with Trump and Russia is a made-up story". On May 31, Trump tweeted, "I never fired James Comey because of Russia!"

=== Personal lawyer ===
In 2017 and in the first half of 2018, Trump repeatedly praised his attorney Michael Cohen as "a great lawyer", "a loyal, wonderful person", "a good man" and someone Trump "always liked" and "respected". In the second half of 2018, with Cohen testifying to federal investigations, Trump attacked Cohen as a "rat", "a weak person, and not a very smart person" and described Cohen as "a PR person who did small legal work, very small legal work ... He represented me very little".

In 2018, Trump told reporters on Air Force One that he did not know about a payment of $130,000 that Cohen made to porn actress Stormy Daniels or where Cohen had obtained the money from. Glenn Kessler of The Washington Post described this statement as a lie, as Trump had personally reimbursed Cohen. On May 30, 2024, a New York City jury found Trump guilty of 34 counts of falsifying business records to conceal these reimbursement payments.

In 2021, several lawyers who had previously worked with Trump, reportedly declined to assist him in asserting executive privilege over the subpoenas served by the House Select Committee on January 6. One of these was William Burck, who had represented 11 Trump associates regarding the Mueller investigation. When Trump was asked about the refusal of his former lawyers to involve themselves in his legal battle, he said: "I don't even know who they are... I am using lawyers who have been with us from the beginning."

=== Spygate conspiracy theory ===
In May 2018, Trump developed and promoted the false Spygate conspiracy theory alleging that the Obama administration planted a spy inside Trump's campaign to help Clinton win the 2016 election, specifically to gather information on the Trump campaign and share it with the Clinton campaign team.

Political commentators and high-ranking politicians from both main parties dismissed Trump's allegations as lacking evidence and maintained that the FBI's use of Halper as a covert informant was in no way improper. Trump's claims about when the counterintelligence investigation was initiated have been shown to be false. A December 2019 Justice Department Inspector General report "found no evidence that the FBI attempted to place any [Confidential Human Sources] within the Trump campaign, recruit members of the Trump campaign as CHSs, or task CHSs to report on the Trump campaign."

=== 2018 California wildfires ===
During the 2018 California wildfires which ultimately caused $3.5 billion (~$4.41 billion in 2025) in damages and killed 103 people, Trump misrepresented a method that Finland uses to control wildfires. After speaking with President of Finland Sauli Niinistö, Trump reported in November 2018, that Niinistö had called Finland a "forest nation" and "they spend a lot of time on raking and cleaning and doing things, and they don't have any problem." Trump's comments sparked online memes about raking leaves. Niinistö clarified there is "a good surveillance system and network" for forest management in Finland and he did not recall having mentioned raking.

=== Special counsel investigation ===
In March 2019, Trump asserted that the Mueller special counsel investigation was "illegal". Previously in June 2018, Trump argued that "the appointment of the Special Counsel is totally UNCONSTITUTIONAL!" However, in August 2018, Dabney Friedrich, a Trump-appointed judge on the DC District Court ruled the appointment was constitutional, as did a unanimous three-judge panel of the Court of Appeals for the DC Circuit in February 2019.

The Mueller Report asserted that Trump's family members, campaign staff, Republican backers, administration officials, and his associates lied or made false assertions, with the plurality of falsehoods from Trump himself, whether unintentional or not, to the public, Congress, or authorities, per a CNN analysis.

Also in March 2019, following the release of Attorney General William Barr's summary of the findings of the completed special counsel investigation, Trump tweeted: "No Collusion, No Obstruction, Complete and Total EXONERATION". However, Barr had quoted special counsel Mueller as writing that "while this report does not conclude that the President committed a crime, it also does not exonerate him" on whether he had committed obstruction of justice. Barr declined to bring an obstruction-of-justice charge against the President. In testimony to Congress in May 2019, Barr said he "didn't exonerate" Trump on obstruction as that was not the role of the Justice Department.

Trump, Republicans, and many otherwise reliable sources have repeatedly and falsely claimed that Mueller found "no collusion", even though Mueller said that he did not investigate "collusion", only "conspiracy" and "coordination". The claim has been described as a myth.

=== Economy ===
Through his first 28 months in office, Trump repeatedly and falsely characterized the economy during his presidency as the best in American history.

As of March 2019, Trump's most repeated falsehoods, each repeated during his presidency more than a hundred times, were that a U.S. trade deficit would be a "loss" for the country, that his tax cuts were the largest in American history, that the economy was the strongest ever during his administration, and that the wall was being built. By August, he had made this last claim at least 190 times. He also made 100 false claims about NATO spending, whether on the part of the U.S. or other NATO members.

Trump claimed during the campaign GDP could grow at "5 or even 6" percent under his policies. During 2018, the economy grew at 3%, the same rate as 2015 under Obama. Obama's advisers described growth limits as "sluggish worker productivity and shrinking labor supply as baby boomers retire".

Trump claimed in October 2017 he would eliminate the federal debt over eight years, even though it was $19 (~$25.00 in 2025) trillion at the time. However, the annual deficit (debt addition) in 2018 was nearly $800 billion, about 60% higher than the CBO forecast of $500 billion when Trump took office. The CBO January 2019 forecast for the 2018–2027 debt addition was 40% higher, at $13 trillion, rather than $9.4 trillion when Trump was inaugurated. Other forecasts place the debt addition over a decade at $16 trillion, bringing the total to around $35 trillion. Rather than a debt to GDP ratio in 2028 of 89% had Obama's policies continued, CBO estimated it at 107%, assuming Trump's tax cuts for individuals are extended past 2025.

Trump sought to present his economic policies as successful in encouraging businesses to invest in new facilities and create jobs. In this effort, he took credit on several occasions for business investments that began before he became president.

Trump repeatedly claimed that China or Chinese exporters were bearing the burden of his tariffs, not Americans, a claim PolitiFact rated as "false". Studies indicate U.S. consumers and purchasers of imports are bearing the cost and that tariffs are essentially a regressive tax. For example, CBO reported in January 2020 that: "Tariffs are expected to reduce the level of [U.S.] real GDP by roughly 0.5 percent and raise consumer prices by 0.5 percent in 2020. As a result, tariffs are also projected to reduce average real household income by $1,277 (in 2019 dollars) in 2020." While Trump has argued that tariffs would reduce the trade deficit, it expanded to a record dollar level in 2018.

Trump repeatedly claimed that the U.S. had a $500 billion annual trade deficit with China before his presidency; the actual deficit never reached $400 billion prior to his presidency.

The following table illustrates some of the key economic variables in the last three years of the Obama Administration (2014–2016) and the first three years of the Trump Administration (2017–2019). Trump often claimed the economy was doing better than it was, after he was elected.

Variable	2014	2015	2016	2017	2018	2019
President	Obama	Obama	Obama	Trump	Trump	Trump
Real GDP growth	2.5%	3.1%	1.7%	2.3%	3.0%	2.2%
Job creation per month (000s)	250	227	195	176	193	178
Unemployment rate (December)	5.6%	5.0%	4.7%	4.1%	3.9%	3.5%
Inflation rate (CPI-All, Avg.)	1.6%	0.1%	1.3%	2.1%	2.4%	1.8%
Real median household income $	$56,969	$59,901	$61,779	$62,626	$63,179	$68,703
Real wage growth %	0.4%	2.2%	1.3%	0.4%	0.6%	1.3%
Mortgage rate 30-yr fixed (Avg.)	4.2%	3.9%	3.7%	4.0%	4.5%	3.9%
Stock market annual % increase (SP 500)	11.4%	0.7%	9.5%	19.4%	6.2%	28.9%
Budget deficit % GDP	2.8%	2.4%	3.2%	3.5%	3.9%	4.6%
Number uninsured (millions)	35.7	28.4	28.2	28.9	30.1	30.4
Trade deficit % GDP	2.8%	2.7%	2.7%	2.8%	3.0%	2.9%

=== Family separation policy ===
President Trump repeatedly and falsely said he inherited his administration's family separation policy from Obama, his predecessor. In November 2018, Trump said, "President Obama separated children from families, and all I did was take the same law, and then I softened the law." In April 2019, Trump said, "President Obama separated children. They had child separation; I was the one that changed it." In June 2019, Trump said, "President Obama had a separation policy. I didn't have it. He had it. I brought the families together. I'm the one that put them together... I inherited separation, and I changed the plan". Trump's assertion was false because the Obama administration had no policy systematically separating migrant families, while "zero tolerance" was not instituted until April 2018. PolitiFact quoted immigration experts saying that under the Obama administration families were detained and released together and separations rarely happened.

=== E. Jean Carroll sexual assault accusation ===
In June 2019, writer E. Jean Carroll accused Trump of raping her in a department store in the mid-1990s. In an official statement, Trump said that (1) he had "never met [Carroll] in my life" although she provided a photograph of them socializing in 1987, and (2) the store shared security footage debunking the claim though in his 2022 deposition for the case, he denied having reached out to the company. Trump was also criticized for saying in 2019 that Carroll was "not [his] type" but in his deposition confusing her in the aforementioned photograph for his ex-wife Marla Maples.

=== Article II and unlimited executive power ===
In July 2019, during a speech addressing youth at Turning Point USA Teen Student Action Summit in Washington, The Washington Post reported that, while criticizing the Mueller investigation, Trump falsely claimed Article Two of the U.S. Constitution ensures, "I have the right to do whatever I want as president." The Post clarified that "Article II grants the president 'executive power'. It does not indicate the president has total power".

=== Hurricane Dorian ===
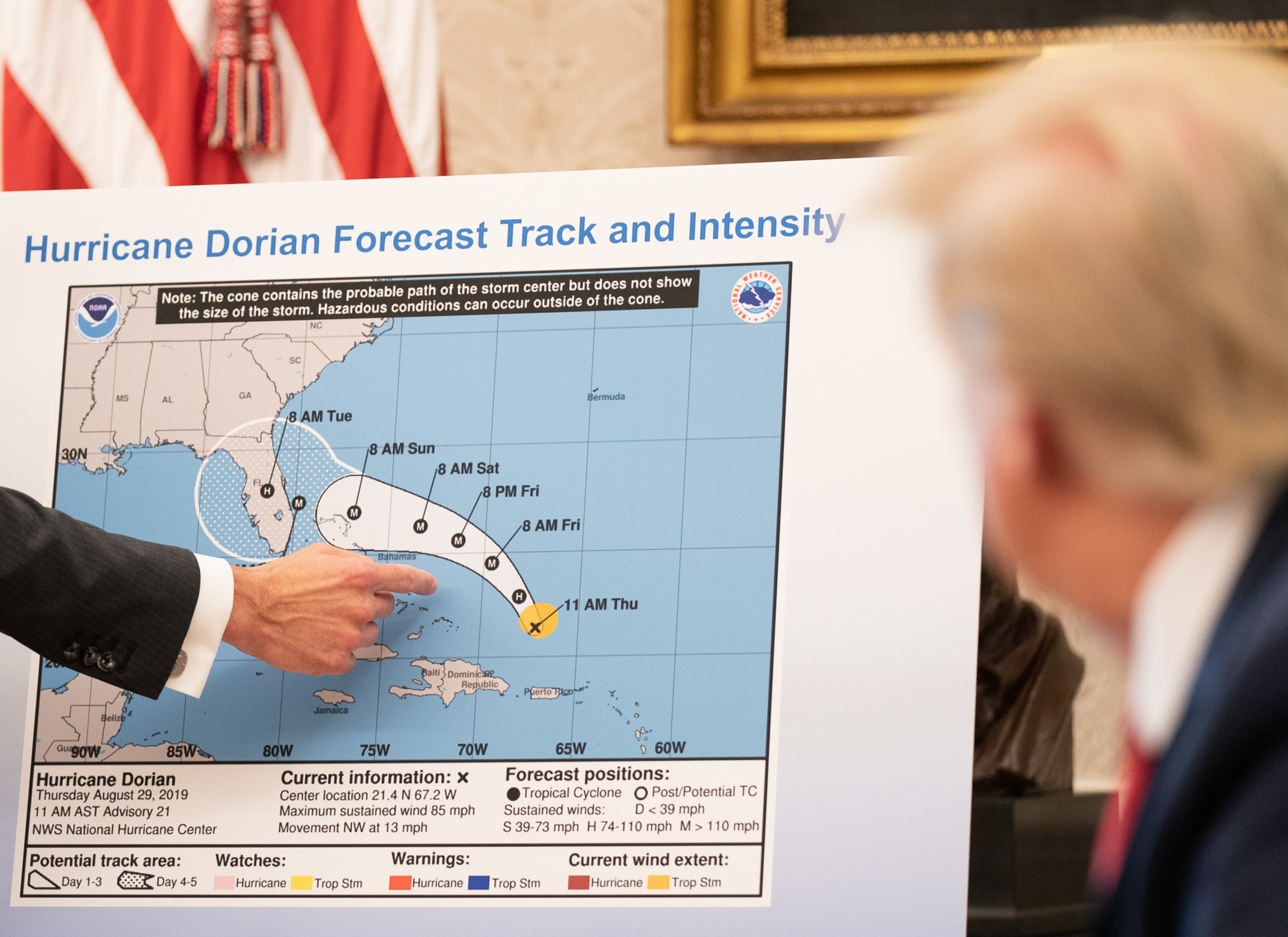
President Trump receives an update on Hurricane Dorian on August 29, 2019. This map was later altered to show the hurricane impacting Alabama.

President Trump displays the altered Hurricane Dorian map in a video published by the White House on September 4, 2019.

As Hurricane Dorian approached the Atlantic coast in August 2019, Trump presented himself as closely monitoring the situation, tweeting extensively as The New York Times reported he was "assuming the role of meteorologist in chief". On September 1, Trump tweeted that Alabama, among other states, "will most likely be hit (much) harder than anticipated". By that time, no forecaster was predicting Dorian would impact Alabama and the eight National Hurricane Center forecast updates over the preceding 24 hours showed Dorian steering well away from Alabama and moving up the coast. The Birmingham, Alabama office of the National Weather Service (NWS) contradicted Trump 20 minutes later, tweeting that Alabama "will NOT see any impacts from Dorian." After ABC News reporter Jonathan Karl reported the correction, Trump tweeted it was "Such a phony hurricane report by lightweight reporter @jonkarl".

On September 4, in the Oval Office, Trump displayed a modified version of an August 29 diagram by the National Hurricane Center of the projected track of Dorian. The modification was done with a black marker and extended the cone of uncertainty of the hurricane's possible path into southern Alabama. Modifying government weather forecasts is illegal in the U.S. Trump was known to use a Sharpie to write on documents, as well as speech notes and on the campaign trail. A White House official told The Washington Post Trump had altered the diagram with a Sharpie marker. Trump said he did not know how the map came to be modified and defended his claims, saying he had "a better map" with models that "in all cases [showed] Alabama was hit". Later on September 4, Trump tweeted a map by the South Florida Water Management District dated August 28 showing numerous projected paths of Dorian; Trump falsely asserted "almost all models" showed Dorian approaching Alabama. A note on the map stated it was "superseded" by National Hurricane Center publications and that it was to be discarded if there were any discrepancies.

On September 5, after Fox News correspondent John Roberts reported about the story, Trump summoned him to the Oval Office. Roberts later characterized Trump as "just looking for acknowledgment that he was not wrong for saying that at some point, Alabama was at risk—even if the situation had changed by the time he issued the tweet". Trump's Homeland Security Advisor Peter Brown issued a statement asserting Trump had been provided a graphic on September 1 showing tropical storm force winds touching the southeastern corner of Alabama; a White House source told CNN that Trump had personally instructed Brown to issue the statement.

On September 6, at Trump's direction, White House chief of staff Mick Mulvaney told Commerce secretary Wilbur Ross to order acting NOAA administrator Neil Jacobs to fix the contradiction by Birmingham NWS, and Ross threatened to fire top NOAA officials if he did not. NOAA then tweeted a statement by an unnamed spokesman disavowing the Birmingham NWS tweet, asserting "the information provided by NOAA and the National Hurricane Center to President Trump and the wider public demonstrated that tropical-storm-force winds from Hurricane Dorian could impact Alabama", adding that the Birmingham tweet "spoke in absolute terms that were inconsistent with probabilities from the best forecast products available at the time". The president of the NWS Employees Organization responded, "the hard-working employees of the NWS had nothing to do with the utterly disgusting and disingenuous tweet sent out by NOAA management tonight". Former senior NOAA executives were sharply critical. That evening, Trump tweeted a video of a CNN hurricane forecast from the Wednesday before his Sunday tweet in which the forecaster mentioned Alabama could be affected by Dorian—with the video altered to show "Alabama" being repeated several times; the video ended with a CNN logo careening off a road and bursting into flames. Trump continued to insist he was correct through September 7, asserting "The Fake News Media was fixated" and tweeting forecast maps from at least two days before his original Sunday tweet,as the media dubbed the episode "Sharpiegate". Commentators expressed bafflement that Trump chose to insist he was correct about what might otherwise have passed as a minor gaffe.

On September 9, NWS director Louis Uccellini said the Birmingham NWS had not tweeted in response to Trump's tweet, but in response to phone calls and social media contacts they had received in response to Trump's tweet. "Only later, when the retweets and politically based comments started coming to their office, did they learn the sources of this information", he said.

Robert Reich called Trump's behavior irrational. "I think we have to face the truth that no one seems to want to admit. This is no longer a case of excessive narcissism or grandiosity. We're not simply dealing with an unusually large ego [...] The president of the United States is seriously, frighteningly, dangerously unstable. And he's getting worse by the day."

Timothy L. O'Brien called Trump "unstable" and said "the world is in danger". "NOAA, an agency built on science and data engineered to provide reliable, impartial information and serve the public interest, wound up purging science and data from its public profile to cover for Trump. This is how good government decays when it's compromised by a cult of personality."

On September 6, NOAA published an unsigned statement which supported Trump's initial claim that Alabama was a target of the storm and criticized the Birmingham NWS office for denying it. It was later revealed that NOAA had been ordered to issue such a statement by Commerce Secretary Wilbur Ross, and that he had been told by Acting White House Chief of Staff Mick Mulvaney to get NOAA to support Trump's original statement that Alabama was threatened. This direct White House involvement raised questions about political influence over NOAA, and is under investigation by multiple agencies including NOAA's acting chief scientist, the inspector general of the Commerce Department, and the House of Representatives committee which oversees NOAA.

=== Meeting with Iran ===
On September 16, 2019, Trump tweeted that "the fake news" was incorrectly reporting that he was willing to meet with Iran with no pre-conditions. Trump had said in July 2018 and June 2019 that he was willing to meet with Iran with no pre-conditions, and secretary of state Mike Pompeo and treasury secretary Steven Mnuchin confirmed this to be Trump's position during a White House press briefing five days before Trump's tweet.

=== U.S military pullout from Kurdistan ===
After Trump ordered the pullout of U.S soldiers from Kurdistan in October 2019 ahead of an expected Turkish military assault, Trump said the Kurds "didn't help us in the Second World War", which was false as Kurdish soldiers fought for allied forces, notably Britain and the Soviet Union.

=== Obamagate conspiracy theory ===
Trump and some of his supporters allege that Obama and his administration conspired to politically surveil Trump's presidential campaign and presidential transition through inappropriate investigations by the Department of Justice, the U.S. Intelligence Community, and the U.S. Foreign Intelligence Surveillance Court. Trump nicknamed the series of events, which he called a major scandal, "Obamagate". Trump's critics called it an unfounded conspiracy theory.

On May 10, 2020—one day after former president Barack Obama criticized the Trump administration's handling of the COVID-19 pandemic—Trump posted a one-word tweet: "OBAMAGATE!" On May 11, Philip Rucker of The Washington Post asked Trump what crime former president Barack Obama committed. Trump's reply was: "Obamagate. It's been going on for a long time ... from before I even got elected and it's a disgrace that it happened.... Some terrible things happened and it should never be allowed to happen in our country again." When Rucker again asked what the crime was, Trump said: "You know what the crime is. The crime is very obvious to everybody. All you have to do is read the newspapers, except yours." On May 15, Trump tweeted that Obamagate was the "greatest political scandal in the history of the United States". This was the third time Trump claimed to be suffering from a scandal of such magnitude, after previously giving Spygate and the Russia investigation similar labels. Also on May 15, Trump linked Obamagate to the "persecution" of Michael Flynn, and a missing 302 form.

Trump called for Congress to summon Obama to testify about "the biggest political crime". Senator Lindsey Graham, chair of the Senate Judiciary Committee, said that he did not expect to summon Obama, but would summon other Obama administration officials. Meanwhile, Attorney General William Barr stated that he did not "expect" Obama to be investigated of a crime. Some of Trump's allies have suggested that the "crime" involved the FBI launching an investigation into incoming national security advisor Michael Flynn, or possibly the "unmasking" by outgoing Obama officials to find out the name of a person who was reported in intelligence briefings to be conversing with the Russian ambassador.

In a May 2020 op-ed at the news website RealClearPolitics, Charles Lipson, professor emeritus of political science at the University of Chicago analyzed the content of "Obamagate". He claimed that the concept refers to three intertwined scandals: (1) The Obama administration conducted mass surveillance through the NSA; (2) the Obama administration used surveillance against Trump's 2016 presidential campaign, and (3) the Obama administration did not transfer power seamlessly to the new Trump administration. Lipson further claimed that "these abuses didn't simply follow each other; their targets, goals, and principal players overlapped. Taken together, they represent some of the gravest violations of constitutional norms and legal protections in American history".

The AP in May 2020 addressed Obamagate in a fact check, stating that there was "no evidence" of Trump's suggestion that "the disclosure of Flynn's name as part of legal U.S. surveillance of foreign targets was criminal and motivated by partisan politics." AP stated that there is not only "nothing illegal about unmasking", but also that the unmasking of Flynn was approved using the National Security Agency's "standard process." Unmasking is allowed if officials feel that it is needed to understand the collected intelligence. AP further pointed out that the Trump administration was conducting even more unmasking than the Obama administration in the final year of Obama's presidency. In May 2020, attorney general Bill Barr appointed federal prosecutor John Bash to examine unmasking conducted by the Obama administration. The inquiry concluded in October with no findings of substantive wrongdoing. By October 2020, the complex "Obamagate" narrative served as an evolution and rebranding of the "Spygate" conspiracy.

=== Joe Scarborough murder conspiracy theory ===
Trump repeatedly advocated a baseless conspiracy theory suggesting that television host Joe Scarborough was involved in the 2001 death of a staffer Lori Klausutis, who worked for Scarborough while the latter was a member of Congress. Trump labeled the woman's death an unsolved "cold case" in one of multiple tweets and called on his followers to continue to "keep digging" and to "use forensic geniuses" to find out more about the death. Scarborough's wife and Morning Joe co-host Mika Brzezinski called the president a "cruel, sick, disgusting person" for his tweets and urged Twitter to remove Trump's tweets. Scarborough called Trump's tweet "unspeakably cruel".

Lori Klausutis was a constituent services coordinator in one of Scarborough's congressional offices in Fort Walton Beach, Florida. Klausutis was found dead on the floor near her desk in that office on July 19, 2001. An autopsy by medical examiner Michael Berkland revealed a previously undiagnosed heart-valve irregularity, floppy mitral valve disease, that caused a cardiac arrhythmia that in turn halted her heart, stopped her breathing, and caused the 28-year-old to lose consciousness, fall, and hit her head on the edge of a desk. Klausutis' cause of death was determined at the time of death to be due to natural causes, and local authorities have never attempted to re-investigate because there was no evidence of an alternative explanation for her death. Scarborough was in Washington, D.C. at the time of her death in Florida.

In May 2020, Klausutis's widower, Timothy Klausutis, called for the removal of Trump's tweets. He wrote a letter to Jack Dorsey, the CEO of Twitter, saying: "I'm asking you to intervene in this instance because the President of the United States has taken something that does not belong to him—the memory of my dead wife—and perverted it for perceived political gain". Twitter refused to take down Trump's false tweets, and the White House Press Secretary, Kayleigh McEnany, only stated that her heart was with the family. Twitter stated that statements by the President, even false ones, are newsworthy.

=== Advances for black Americans ===
In 2020, Trump claimed multiple times that he or his administration had "done more for the black community than any president", in some cases compared to all presidents, and in other cases to all presidents "since Abraham Lincoln" (who abolished slavery in the U.S.). Prominent historians instead pointed to Lyndon B. Johnson as the president who did most for the black community since Lincoln, for his Civil Rights Act of 1964 and his Voting Rights Act of 1965. The historians also highlighted that the presidencies of Harry S. Truman, Ulysses S. Grant, Franklin D. Roosevelt, John F. Kennedy, and Barack Obama had done much for the black community. Trump's own achievements were dismissed as minor, while Trump was faulted for racially divisive rhetoric and attacks on voting rights.

=== Republican Party approval rating tweets ===
Donald J. Trump
(@realDonaldTrump)
tweeted:

President Trump Approval Rating in the Republican Party at 96%. Thank You!

July 10, 2020

After Trump took office in 2017, he routinely tweeted an approval rating between 94% and 98% in the Republican Party without citing a source. Trump tweeted these approval ratings almost weekly, with a percentage around 96%. For example, a tweet from June 16, 2020, by Trump says "96% Approval Rating in the Republican Party. Thank you!" Another tweet from August 23, 2019, says "94% Approval Rating within the Republican Party. Thank you!" Trump's approval rating in the Republican Party was found to be around 88% in a Fox News poll, 90% in a Gallup poll and 79% in an AP-NORC poll, with no evidence to support his tweets of approval ratings around 96%. In 2020, the Pew Research Center reported an average approval rating of 87% amongst Republicans.

=== Ilhan Omar ===
In 2019, Trump falsely accused Ilhan Omar of praising al-Qaeda, describing remarks Omar made in 2013 about how one of her college professors acted when he discussed al-Qaeda. In 2021, Trump stated without evidence that Omar married her brother, committed "large-scale immigration and election fraud", and wished "death to Israel".

=== COVID-19 pandemic ===
In the early stages of the pandemic, Trump's pronouncements "evolved from casual dismissal to reluctant acknowledgement to bellicose mobilization". Though Trump "occasionally adopted health officials' more cautious tone", the optimism that dominated his early response "hadn't completely disappeared", Trump having downplayed the threat of COVID-19 over 200 times by November 3, 2020.

As U.S. cases reached 4,800,000 and deaths reached 157,690 in the summer of 2020, Trump repeated his assertion that he believes coronavirus will "go away" despite his top public health expert warning that it could take most of 2021 or longer to get the pandemic under control. Trump "made numerous versions of this assertion over...more than six months".

After the December 2020 introduction of COVID vaccines, a partisan gap in death rates developed, indicating the effects of vaccine skepticism. As of March 2024, more than 30 percent of Republicans had not received a Covid vaccine, compared with less than 10 percent of Democrats.

Trump denied responsibility for his administration's disbanding of the Pandemic Response Team headed by Rear Adm. R. Timothy Ziemer in 2018.

Trump made false, misleading, or inaccurate statements related to the COVID-19 pandemic, such as "We have it under control. It's going to be just fine" (January 22, 2020); "Looks like by April, you know, in theory, when it gets a little warmer, it miraculously goes away" (February 10), and "Anybody that wants a test can get a test" (March 6). Trump repeatedly claimed the pandemic would "go away", even as daily new cases rose.

On February 24, Trump tweeted: "The Coronavirus is very much under control in the USA", and the next day Trump said, "I think that whole situation will start working out. We're very close to a vaccine", when none was known to be near production. In late February, the Trump Administration stated that the outbreak containment was "close to airtight" and the virus is only as deadly as the seasonal flu. The administration also stated that the outbreak was "contained" in early March even as the number of U.S. cases continued to increase, regardless of being publicly challenged.

While on Fox News, Trump contradicted the World Health Organization (WHO) estimate that the global mortality rate for SARS-CoV-2 coronavirus is 3.4%, saying. "Well, I think the 3.4 percent is really a false number—and this is just my hunch—but based on a lot of conversations with a lot of people that do this, because a lot of people will have this and it's very mild, they'll get better very rapidly. They don't even see a doctor. They don't even call a doctor. You never hear about those people", and said his "hunch" is that the real figure is "way under 1%". Trump speculated that "thousands or hundreds of thousands" of people might have recovered "by, you know, sitting around and even going to work—some of them go to work but they get better", contradicting medical advice to slow disease transmission. On March 17, Trump stated, "I felt it was a pandemic long before it was called a pandemic."

Anthony Fauci, director of National Institute of Allergy and Infectious Diseases, said in a Science interview that before press conferences, the task force presents its consensus to Trump "and somebody writes a speech. Then (Trump) gets up and ad libs". Fauci said the task force told Trump to "be careful about this and don't say that", Fauci added "I can't jump in front of the microphone and push him down. OK, he said it. Let's try and get it corrected for the next time."

Trump made 33 false claims about Covid in the first two weeks of March, per CNN analysis. Trump made other incorrect Covid statements. One false claim was that the U.S. had the highest rate per capita of COVID-19 testing, which it did not, compared to South Korea, Italy, and Germany. Trump's misrepresentations attempted to paint the federal response in an excessively positive light, such as claiming hospitals "even in the really hot spots" were "really thrilled" with the level of medical supplies, when in fact hospitals were concerned about shortages of medications, personal protective equipment, and ventilators.

An NBC News/Wall Street Journal poll conducted in April, found 36% of Americans trusted Trump for information on COVID, and 52% distrusted him. On April 14, Trump said he had "total" authority to reopen states, then said the next day that governors had to make decisions on when to reopen.

On April 16, Trump said "Our experts say the curve has flattened, and the peak...is behind us." Trump added that "Nationwide, more than 850 counties, or nearly 30 percent of our country, have reported no new cases in the last seven days." The 30% of counties represented 6% of the population. Cases were added in counties where 94% of the population lived.

On April 28, while discussing his own response to the pandemic, Trump falsely suggested that in late February, Fauci had said that the American COVID outbreak was "no problem" and was "going to blow over". Contrary to Trump's claims, Fauci had said in a February 29 interview that "now the risk is still low, but this could change...You've got to watch out because although the risk is low now...when you start to see community spread, this could change and force you to become much more attentive to doing things that would protect you from spread ... this could be a major outbreak." Fauci had stressed "we want to underscore that this is an evolving situation".

On "totally harmless" cases

Now we have tested over 40 million people. But by so doing, we show cases, 99 percent of which are totally harmless.

— South Lawn "Salute to America" speech
July 4, 2020
On COVID testing

Think of this: If we didn't do testing—instead of testing over 40 million people, if we did half the testing, we would have half the cases. If we did another—you cut that in half, we would have, yet again, half of that.

— Rose Garden press conference
July 14, 2020
On per capita death rates

Journalist: "I'm talking about death as a proportion of population. That's where the US is really bad. ..."
Trump: "You can't do that! You have to go by—look, here's the United States—you have to go by (death as a proportion of) the cases."

— Interview with Jonathan Swan
August 2020
On effectiveness of masks

Just the other day (the CDC) came out with a statement that 85 percent of the people that wear masks catch it.

— Trump in the NBC Town Hall
October 15, 2020

On May 19, Trump tweeted a statement claiming the WHO had ignored credible reports of the virus spreading in Wuhan in December 2019, including from The Lancet. The Lancet rejected Trump's claims, saying "The Lancet published no report in December 2019, referring to a virus or outbreak in Wuhan or anywhere else in China. The first reports the journal published were on January 24, 2020". The Lancet wrote that the allegations Trump made against the WHO were "serious and damaging to efforts to strengthen international cooperation to control this pandemic". The Lancet said "It is essential that any review of the global response is based on a factually accurate account of what took place in December and January".

On June 20, at a rally in Oklahoma, Trump suggested America should slow down testing. In response to the high number of tests, he said that "When you do testing to that extent, you're going to find more people, you're going to find more cases, so I said to my people, 'Slow the testing down, please.'" White House officials claimed that Trump was only joking. In an interview, Trump said that while he never gave an order to slow down testing, he claimed that if the U.S. slowed down the testing, they would look like they're doing better. "I wouldn't do that", he said, "but I will say this: We do so much more than other countries it makes us, in a way, look bad but actually we're doing the right thing." The percentage of positive cases in the U.S. was over two times higher than recommended by the WHO.

On July 4, 2020, Trump falsely stated that "99 percent" of cases are "totally harmless". Trump contradicted public health experts by saying that the U.S. will "likely have a therapeutic and/or vaccine solution long before the end of the year". FDA commissioner Stephen Hahn declined to state whether Trump's "99 percent" statement was accurate or to say how many cases are harmless. In March 2020, the WHO had estimated 15% of COVID cases become severe and 5% become critical.

As the U.S. daily new case count increased from about 20,000 on June 9 to over 50,000 by July 7, Trump repeatedly insisted the increase was a function of increased COVID-19 testing. Trump's claims were contradicted by the fact states having increased case counts, as well as those having decreased case counts, had increased testing, that the positive test rate increased in all ten states with the largest case increases, and that case rate increases consistently exceeded testing rate increases in states with the most new cases.

On August 5, 2020, Trump asserted that children should go back to school and learn in an in-person setting. He said, "If you look at children, children are almost, I would almost say definitely, but almost immune from this disease. So few. Hard to believe. I don't know how you feel about it but they have much stronger immune systems than we do somehow for this. They don't have a problem." According to the U.S. Centers for Disease Control and Prevention, children account for about 7% of COVID cases. A study reported in Science Magazine showed that "children under age 14 are between one-third and one-half as likely as adults to contract the virus." Facebook took action against Trump's claim that children are "almost immune", removing a video of him claiming this posted on his account. Twitter took action against a similar tweet made by Trump's campaign, stating the account would be restricted from tweeting until the tweet was removed. The account removed the tweet that day.

Trump noted New Zealand's success in dealing with COVID while referring on August 18, 2020, to a "big surge in New Zealand"—on a day when New Zealand had 13 new reported cases, a cumulative total of 1,643 COVID cases and a cumulative total of 22 COVID-related deaths, with no new COVID-related deaths reported since May 2020. Commentators in New Zealand called Trump's terminology into question—Deputy Prime Minister Winston Peters noted: "The American people can work out that what we have for a whole day, they have every 22 seconds of the day [...]." (New Zealand has a population about 1.5% of the U.S.)

In 18 interviews from December 5, 2019, to July 21, 2020, between Trump and Bob Woodward, Trump admitted he deceived the public about the severity of the pandemic. On February 7, he told Woodward, "This is deadly stuff. You just breathe the air and that's how it's passed. And so that's a very tricky one. That's a very delicate one. It's also more deadly than even your strenuous flu." On March 19, he said, "I wanted to always play it down. I still like playing it down, because I don't want to create a panic." Audio recordings of these interviews were released on September 9, 2020.

Legal analyst Glenn Kirschner argued that Trump should be charged with manslaughter for deaths resulting from him intentionally lying to the public about the danger posed by COVID.

=== The military and veterans ===
In 2014, a bipartisan initiative for veterans' healthcare, led by Senators Bernie Sanders and John McCain, was signed into law by President Barack Obama. The Veterans Choice program enables eligible veterans to receive government funding for healthcare provided outside the VA system. In 2018, Trump signed the VA MISSION Act to expand the eligibility criteria. Over the next two years, Trump falsely claimed over 150 times that he had created the Veterans Choice program itself. When reporter Paula Reid questioned him about this in August 2020, noting that he repeatedly made a "false statement" in taking credit for the program, Trump abruptly walked out of the news conference.

In a speech given at Al Asad Airbase to US military personnel on Christmas 2018, Trump boasted that the military had not gotten a raise in ten years, and that he would be giving them a raise of over 10 percent. In fact, American military personnel received a pay hike of at least one percent for the past 30 years, got a 2.4 percent pay increase in 2018, and would receive a 2.6 percent pay increase for 2019.

On January 3, 2020, Trump stated in a speech "Last night, at my direction, the United States military successfully executed a flawless precision strike that killed the number-one terrorist anywhere in the world, Qasem Soleimani." Trump's act of changing the reasons for killing Soleimani were questioned and analyzed by fact-checkers, and Secretary of Defense Mark Esper contradicted Trump's claim that the Iranians were planning to attack four embassies.

=== Voting by mail ===
Donald J. Trump
(@realDonaldTrump)
tweeted:

There is NO WAY (ZERO!) that Mail-In Ballots will be anything less than substantially fraudulent. Mail boxes will be robbed, ballots will be forged & even illegally printed out & fraudulently signed. The Governor of California is sending Ballots to millions of people, anyone living in the state, no matter who they are or how they got there, will get one. That will be followed up with professionals telling all of these people, many of whom have never even thought of voting before, how, and for whom, to vote. This will be a Rigged Election. No way!

May 26, 2020

President Trump repeatedly made false, misleading or baseless claims in his criticism of voting by mail in the U.S. This included claims that other countries would print "millions of mail-in ballots", claims that "80 million unsolicited ballots" were being sent to Americans, and claims that Nevada's presidential election process was "100% rigged". Another claim was alleging massive voter fraud. In September 2020, FBI Director Christopher A. Wray, who was appointed by Trump, testified under oath that the FBI had "not seen, historically, any kind of coordinated national voter fraud effort in a major election, whether it's by mail or otherwise".

=== 2020 presidential election ===
CNN fact checker Daniel Dale reported that through June 9, 2021, Trump had issued 132 written statements since leaving office, of which "a third have included lies about the election"—more than any other subject.

Missing ballots

Did you see they found 50,000 ballots in, like, a river?

— Trump, in Michigan, October 2020

During his 2020 presidential campaign, Trump claimed his opponent Joe Biden would "destroy" Americans' "protections for pre-existing conditions", while Trump's administration has said the entire Affordable Care Act, which created such protections, should be struck down.

On November 4, Trump delivered a speech inside the White House falsely claiming he had already won the 2020 presidential election. He made numerous false and misleading statements to support his belief that vote counting should stop and that he should be confirmed as the winner. After Joe Biden was declared the winner of the election, Trump repeatedly and falsely claimed Biden had won through ballot fraud against him. He repeated and tweeted false and misleading claims about vote counting, Dominion Voting Systems, poll watchers, alleged voting irregularities, and more. During the two-month transition period to the Biden administration, according to a Huffington Post count of his false claims, Trump said the election was rigged (he made this claim 68 times), stolen (35 times), determined by fraudulent or miscounted votes (250 times), and affected by malfunctioning voting machines (45 times).

Following the election, Trump continued to claim he had won it and that it was a rigged election. Anthony Scaramucci, a longtime Trump associate who was briefly White House communications director before breaking with Trump, said in July 2022 that the former president knew the election had not been stolen. Scaramucci said that during the 2016 campaign Trump had asked him and others why people didn't realize he was playacting and 'full of it' at least half the time, "so he knows that this is all a lie." Years later, Trump persists in the false claim about the 2020 election. For example, on August 29, 2022, he demanded on Truth Social that the nation "declare the rightful winner or ... have a new Election, immediately!"

In October 2022, a U.S. District Court Judge ruled that Trump and allies participated in a "knowing misrepresentation of voter fraud numbers in Georgia when seeking to overturn the election results in federal court". Specifically, the judge wrote that "President Trump knew that the specific numbers of voter fraud were wrong but continued to tout those numbers, both in court and to the public". The judge also found that related emails "are sufficiently related to and in furtherance of a conspiracy to defraud the United States" that the crime-fraud exemption voids Trump's lawyer's claim of attorney–client privilege.

On April 25, 2023, CNN reported that Trump had told a new lie about the 2020 election: "Trump pointedly noted that Biden got more votes than Trump in fewer than a fifth of US counties in 2020. Trump then said, 'Nothing like this has ever happened before. Usually, it's very equal, or—but the winner always had the most counties.'" The statement was described as "complete bunk". Both "Barack Obama in 2008 and 2012 and Bill Clinton in 1992 and 1996, carried a minority of counties in each of their victories." William H. Frey, a senior fellow at the Brookings Institution, said:

There is nothing suspicious about winning the presidency with a smaller number of counties. Counties vary widely in size, with large urban and suburban counties—areas where Biden did best—housing far larger populations than most of the outer suburb, small town and rural counties that Trump won.

On July 18, 2023, when responding to Sean Hannity at a town hall meeting in Iowa, Trump told a new lie: "I also have to say something else, 'cause the one thing a lot of people, including you, don't talk about: they also create phony ballots, and that's a real problem. That's my opinion. They create a lot of phony ballots." The claim was described as "pure fiction".

=== January 6 attack ===
On the attack of the Capitol

It was zero threat. Right from the start, it was zero threat. ... Some of them went in, and they're hugging and kissing the police and the guards, you know? They had great relationships. A lot of the people were waved in, and then they walked in, and they walked out.

— Donald Trump on March 25, 2021
Phone interview with Fox News
"... unbelievable patriots ...

You see the spirit from the hostages, and that's what they are—hostages.

— Trump, March 16, 2024
Campaign rally, Dayton, Ohio

During the January 6, 2021, attack, minutes after Mike Pence had been rushed off the Senate floor, Trump tweeted that "Mike Pence didn't have the courage" to refuse to certify the election results, implying Pence had the Constitutional power to do so—a claim dismissed by the federal judges in the final two of 62 election-related lawsuits.

In a January 7, 2021, White House video, Trump claimed, falsely, that he had "immediately deployed the National Guard and federal law enforcement to secure the building and expel the intruders".

Among outtakes for the January 7 video that were shown on July 21, 2022, by the House Select Committee, Trump remarked, "I don't want to say the election's over. I just want to say Congress has certified the results without saying the election's over, OK?"

In late March 2021, Trump said the rioters "were ushered in by the police" and "They showed up just to show support", which is false in view of the 140 assaults on police officers in hours-long battles involving police engaging in hand-to-hand combat to try to keep rioters out of the building.

At a July 7, 2021, news conference, Trump claimed "the person that shot Ashli Babbitt right through the head, just boom. There was no reason for that"; in fact, Babbitt was shot in the shoulder as she tried to enter an area of the Capitol used to evacuate lawmakers and was within sight of lawmakers being evacuated.

In a July 11, 2021, interview on Fox News, Trump called the events of January 6 a "lovefest" and said that it was "not right" that the rioters were "currently incarcerated"—conflicting with his January 7 statement telling rioters, "You will pay."

In an interview that aired on December 1, 2021, Trump said "hundreds and hundreds of thousands of people" had gathered to hear him speak on the day of the January 6, 2021 attack on the Capitol, saying "I think it was the largest crowd I've ever spoken before"; the Associated Press reported it as "several thousand." Investigators estimated that "more than 2,000 people" entered the Capitol.

On December 10, 2021, Trump told Fox News that the attack was "a protest" and that "the insurrection took place on November 3" (election day), while in fact about 140 police officers were assaulted and the peaceful transfer of power was violently interrupted in an attack that involved thousands of alleged crimes, and the election was neither rigged nor fraudulent. Trump also said to Fox News of his January 6 speech that "if you look at my words and what I said in the speech, they were extremely calming, actually", while in fact his speech proclaimed that "we fight like hell. And if you don't fight like hell, you're not going to have a country anymore."

On December 21, 2021, Trump made a statement calling the attack a "completely unarmed protest". Former White House aide Cassidy Hutchinson subsequently testified before the House January 6 committee that the Secret Service had warned Trump on January 6 that protestors were carrying weapons, but that Trump demanded that the magnetometers—used to detect metallic weapons—be disabled, so that more supporters would fill the rally space. When warned, Trump is said to have angrily responded:

I don't fucking care that they have weapons, they're not here to hurt me. They're not here to hurt me. Take the fucking mags away. Let my people in. They can march to the Capitol from here, let the people in and take the mags away.

Some protestors were armed with guns, stun guns, knives, batons, baseball bats, axes, and chemical sprays. In January 2022, the Justice Department made an official statement that over 75 people had been charged with entering a restricted area with "a dangerous or deadly weapon".

In a February 5, 2022, rally, Trump said that if he runs again in 2024, "we will treat those people from January 6 fairly... And if it requires pardons, we will give them pardons. Because they are being treated so unfairly"—the claim of unfairness being unsupported by evidence. Trump's claim echoed his September 16, 2021, written statement that "Our hearts and minds are with the people being persecuted so unfairly relating to the January 6th protest concerning the Rigged Presidential Election".

== See also ==
- False or misleading statements by Donald Trump (between terms)
- False or misleading statements by Donald Trump (second term)
