= Jeremy Adam Smith =

Jeremy Adam Smith (born April 4, 1970) is the editor of Greater Good magazine, which is published by the UC Berkeley Greater Good Science Center. He is also the author or co-editor of five books, founding editor of Shareable.net, and an investigative journalist and essayist whose work focuses on education, family, and community life. Before becoming a full-time writer and editor, Smith launched the Independent Press Development Fund and served as publisher of Dollars and Sense magazine. In 2010-11, Smith was a John S. Knight journalism fellow at Stanford University.

== Body of Work ==
Smith is the author of The Daddy Shift: How Stay-at-Home Dads, Breadwinning Moms, and Shared Parenting are Transforming the American Family (Beacon Press, June 2009); co-editor of The Compassionate Instinct (WW Norton, January 2010); and co-editor of Are We Born Racist? (Beacon Press, August 2010). He is also the author of numerous essays, articles, and short stories for publications that include Scientific American, San Francisco Chronicle, Wired (magazine), and Utne Reader. He was the founder of the blog Daddy Dialectic. Smith has also collaborated with the web show DadLabs to produce a series of segments on the science of fatherhood, and has appeared on Nightline, Forum with Michael Krasny, and other TV and radio shows. His next two books, forthcoming in 2018, focus on the science of gratitude.

Smith’s writing—much of which covers family life from a male but pro-feminist perspective—has been acclaimed by feminist intellectuals such as Miriam Peskowtiz, Shira Tarrant, Stephanie Coontz, Rebecca Walker, and Lisa Jervis, who calls The Daddy Shift "a major contribution." SUNY sociologist Michael Kimmel also praised The Daddy Shift as "impassioned and insightful, careful and compassionate." The 2009 book argues that as the definition of fatherhood has grown to encompass both caregiving and breadwinning, men are better equipped today than in the past to survive layoffs and other economic calamities. He also argues that workplace and public policy must change to recognize that the definition of fatherhood has changed.

From 2012 to 2017, Smith's coverage of racial and economic segregation in San Francisco schools won numerous honors, including the Sigma Delta Chi Award for investigative reporting, the PASS Award from the National Council on Crime and Delinquency, the National Award for Education Reporting, and many excellence in journalism awards from the Northern California Society of Professional Journalists. He is also a three-time winner of the John Swett Award from the California Teachers Association.

== Criticism ==
On March 25, 2007, at the liberal website Talking Points Memo, feminist lawyer and author Linda Hirshman harshly criticized Smith and the blogger Rebeldad, whom she describes as "legendary stay-at home dads of the Internet." Smith, she writes, "didn't even stay home a year ...I'd hate to be the woman with the desk next to [Smith], taking family leave while he minds the workplace." Smith responded three weeks later on his blog, Daddy Dialectic, saying "Dads like me and Rebeldad are not really her target,” wrote Smith. “Instead she is attacking the very idea of caregiving."
