= George C. Edwards III =

American political scientist

George C. Edwards III is an American educator and political scholar. He currently is University Distinguished Professor of Political Science and Jordan Chair in Presidential Studies Emeritus at Texas A&M University and Distinguished Fellow at the University of Oxford. He is a scholar of American politics, particularly of the American presidency, authoring or editing 29 books and approximately 100 articles and essays.

== Early life and education ==
Edwards was born in 1947. He attended Stetson University, graduating magna cum laude with a Bachelor of Arts degree in 1969. He subsequently studied political science at the University of Wisconsin, Madison, receiving a Master of Arts degree in 1970 and a Ph.D. in 1973. He also holds an M.A. degree from the University of Oxford.

== Academic career ==
He taught at Tulane University from 1973 to 1978 before moving to Texas A&M University in 1978. There he was the founder and from 1991 to 2001 the director of The Center for Presidential Studies. In addition, from 1998 until 2022, he was editor of Presidential Studies Quarterly. He is also the general editor of the Oxford Handbook of American Politics (Oxford University Press) series and since 2007 an Associate Member of Nuffield College, University of Oxford.

Edwards has also held a number of distinguished visiting appointments, including: 2017, Warden's Visitor, Nuffield College, University of Oxford; 2012–2013, John Winant Professor of American Government and Professorial Fellow, Balliol College, University of Oxford; 2009, Fellow, Nuffield College, University of Oxford; 2008, Chercheur Invité, Sciences Po-Paris; 2005–06, Olin Professor of American Government and Professorial Fellow, Nuffield College, University of Oxford; 2004, 2007 Fellow, University of London; 2002–2003, John Adams Fellow, School of Advanced Studies, University of London; 1997, Professor of Political Science, Hebrew University of Jerusalem; 1993, Professor of Political Science, Peking University, Beijing; and 1985–1988, Professor of Social Sciences, U.S. Military Academy, West Point.

Edwards has served as president of the Presidency Research Section of the American Political Science Association, which has named its annual dissertation prize in his honor and awarded him its Career Service Award. A member of Phi Beta Kappa and a Woodrow Wilson Fellow, he has received the Decoration for Distinguished Civilian Service from the U.S. Army and the Pi Sigma Alpha Prize from the Southern Political Science Association. He is also a member of the Council on Foreign Relations. He has served on the Board of Directors of the Roper Center, the Board of Trustees of the Center for the Study of the Presidency, and many editorial boards.

He has spoken to more than 300 universities and other groups in the U.S. and abroad, keynoted numerous national and international conferences, and given several thousand interviews with the national and international press.

Edwards with President George H. W. Bush

In addition, Edwards has applied his scholarship to practical issues of governing, including advising Brazil on its constitution and the operation of its presidency, Russia on building a democratic national party system, Mexico on elections, and Chinese scholars on democracy. He also authored studies for the 1988, 2000, 2016, and 2020 U.S. presidential transitions and was active in bringing the George Bush Presidential Library and Museum to Texas A&M University's campus.

== Selected works ==
- Ten Myths about American Politics (Bloomsbury Academic, 2027).
- Why the Electoral College Is Bad for America, 4th ed. (Cambridge University Press, 2024).
- Prisoners of Their Premises: How Unexamined Assumptions Lead to War and Other Policy Debacles (Chicago, 2022).
- Changing Their Minds? Donald Trump and Presidential Leadership (Chicago, 2021).
- Predicting the Presidency: The Potential of Persuasive Leadership (Princeton, 2016).
- Overreach: Leadership in the Obama Presidency (Princeton, 2012).
- The Strategic President: Persuasion and Opportunity in Presidential Leadership (Princeton, 2009).
- The Oxford Handbook of the American Presidency (Oxford, 2009), co-editor.
- The Polarized Presidency of George W. Bush (Oxford University Press, 2007), co-authored with Desmond King.
- Governing by Campaigning: The Politics of the Bush Presidency, 2nd ed. (Longman, 2007).
- On Deaf Ears: The Limits of the Bully Pulpit (Yale, 2003).
- Researching the Presidency (University of Pittsburgh Press, 2009).
- Presidential Approval (Johns Hopkins, 1990).
- At the Margins: Presidential Leadership of Congress (Yale, 1989).
- National Security and the U.S. Constitution (Johns Hopkins University Press, 1988).
- The Public Presidency (St. Martin's, 1983).
- Presidential Influence in Congress (W.H. Freeman, 1980).
- Implementing Public Policy (Congressional Quarterly Press, 1980).
- The Policy Predicament: Making and Implementing Public Policy (W.H. Freeman, 1978), co-authored with Ira Sharkansky
