= Daniel Dale =

Canadian journalist and fact-checker

- Born: 1984 or 1985 (age 41–42); Toronto, Ontario, Canada
- Education: Schulich School of Business, York University (BBA)
- Occupation: Journalist
- Employers: Toronto Star (2008–2019); CNN (2019–present)
- Spouse: Kelsey Shamburger (m. 2022)
- Children: 1

Daniel Dale (born 1984 or 1985) is a Canadian journalist known for rebutting a large number of false claims made by United States president Donald Trump during his 2016 presidential campaign and presidency. Dale credits an encounter with Toronto Mayor Rob Ford while covering the mayor and his brother Doug for the Toronto Star as the inspiration for developing his brand of adversarial journalism.

He went on to serve as the Star's Washington bureau chief from 2015 to 2019. In June 2019, Dale was hired by CNN to contribute to a regular "Facts First" column in CNN Politics. Until March 2026, Dale regularly appeared on CNN broadcasts to fact-check Trump.

== Early life and education ==
Daniel Dale was born to a Jewish family and raised in Thornhill, Ontario. He earned a Bachelor of Business Administration from York University's Schulich School of Business. During his time at university, Dale became interested in journalism, and he wrote for campus publications and applied for journalism internships.

== Career ==
=== 2010–2014: Covering Rob and Doug Ford ===
After graduating from university, Dale joined the Toronto Star in 2008. Dale worked for the Star as their Toronto City Hall reporter and bureau chief, covering the administration of Mayor Rob Ford and his brother Doug from 2010 to 2014.

In May 2012, Dale investigated a potential purchase of public lands near Rob Ford's home when Dale and Ford had an incident. According to Ford, a neighbor had informed him that someone was taking pictures over the back of his fence, which prompted him to confront Dale. Dale denied Ford's version of the incident, saying that he had not come within 10 feet of the mayor's property. He said that Ford was "extremely agitated" and had frightened him into leaving behind his mobile phone and digital recorder at the scene of the incident. The police later announced that no charges would be filed in the incident.

In December 2013, Ford accused Dale of taking pictures of Ford's children on his property in the previous incident; Dale denied the accusation, saying that he had never taken any photographs of Ford's family, which was corroborated by a police investigation. Ford later retracted the accusations, stating "there was absolutely no basis for the statement I made about Mr. Dale taking pictures," in response to Dale launching a lawsuit against him. After a lengthy apology from Ford, Dale dropped the lawsuit. Dale later stated that the incident inspired him to take up fact-checking, telling The Daily Beast in 2020: "The Star let me write a column headlined 'Rob Ford is lying about me and it's vile,' and I started thinking after that, if I can say 'lie' about something concerning me, why can't I say that about other lies? That was a big moment."

In 2014, Dale fact-checked the candidates of that year's Toronto mayoral election.

=== 2015–2019: Tenure as Toronto Star Washington bureau chief ===
In 2015, Dale traveled to Washington, D.C., to serve as the Washington bureau chief for the Toronto Star. During his tenure, Dale covered events in the last two years of the presidency of Barack Obama, such as the heroin crisis, the Flint water crisis and the presidential campaign and presidency of Donald Trump.

In November 2015, Dale traveled to Milwaukee to write about its racial segregation. When the August 2016 Milwaukee riots broke out, several U.S. journalists made use of Dale's reporting to gain an understanding of why the riots occurred.

Starting in September 2016, Dale compiled informal lists of then-presidential candidate Trump's falsehoods together with parenthetical fact checks in his spare time, sharing the lists on Twitter. In the same month, filmmaker Michael Moore praised Dale in a tweet, saying that Dale "shame[d] the US media", which resulted in Dale gaining a larger following on Twitter. Dale maintained a list of fact-checks of Trump for the Toronto Star from the beginning of Trump's presidency until he departed from the Star in June 2019.

On October 1, 2017, Trump tweeted: "Being nice to Rocket Man [Trump's nickname for Kim Jong-un] hasn't worked in 25 years, why would it work now? Clinton failed, Bush failed, and Obama failed. I won't fail." Dale responded to Trump's tweet, noting that Kim Jong-un was eight years old in 1992. Trump subsequently blocked Dale on Twitter.

In November 2017, when news broke on the sexual misconduct allegations against Roy Moore, the Republican nominee in the United States Senate special election in Alabama, Dale contacted more than five Republican chairmen across Alabama for comment; several officials told Dale that the allegations did not change their support for Moore. The Washington Post used Dale's work as a source for Republican reaction to the scandal.

=== 2019–present: CNN ===
In June 2019, Dale left the Toronto Star to join CNN as a full-time fact-checker for Trump, later becoming a senior reporter for the network. During the 2020 United States presidential election, Dale fact-checked both Trump and his opponent Joe Biden during the key events, including the presidential debates and convention speeches. Dale fact-checked Trump and Kamala Harris during the 2024 United States presidential election cycle.

Until March 2026, Dale regularly appeared on CNN broadcasts to fact-check statements by Trump. His absence since then has drawn scrutiny due to coinciding with the proposed acquisition of CNN parent company Warner Bros. Discovery by Paramount Skydance. CNN denied a connection between Dale's absence and the acquisition. Dale has continued to publish fact-checks on the CNN website. Following the initial reporting by the Status newsletter, Dale appeared on a CNN broadcast to fact-check Trump.

== Personal life ==
Dale married Kelsey Shamburger in July 2022. They live with their child and their pet Pomeranian. In June 2025, Dale and his wife moved to Toronto to raise their child.

Dale is a teetotaler, having only had two drinks in his life.

== Awards and honors ==
Dale won the Edward Goff Penny Memorial Prize in 2010 and 2011, the National Newspaper Award for Short Feature in 2012 and the Norman Webster Award for International Reporting in 2019.

Politico ranked Dale 8th in its list of 16 breakout media stars of 2016 for his fact-checking of Trump. Rolling Stone named Dale's Twitter account its "Hot News Source" in 2018. Toronto Life ranked Dale 47th in its list of the top 50 influential Torontonians in 2017, and 49th in 2018.
