= New York State Department of Labor =

Governmental agency enforcing labor law and administering unemployment benefits

Department of Labor
- Seal

- Logo

Department overview
- Formed: 1901
- Jurisdiction: New York
- Headquarters: Building 12, W.A. Harriman Campus, Albany, NY 12240
- Department executive: Roberta Reardon, Commissioner of Labor
- Key document: Labor Law
- Website: dol.ny.gov

The New York State Department of Labor (DOL or NYSDOL) is the department of the New York state government that enforces labor law and administers unemployment benefits.

The mission of the New York State Department of Labor is to protect workers, assist the unemployed and connect job seekers to jobs, according to its website. It works to ensure a fair wage for all workers, protect the safety and health of workers and the public, help the unemployed via temporary payments (unemployment insurance), link job seekers with employers, and guide workers to training. Its regulations are compiled in title 12 of the New York Codes, Rules and Regulations.

The NYS Department of Labor of today came as a direct result of the Triangle Shirtwaist Factory Fire, which took place on March 25, 1911.

== Unemployment insurance ==
Unemployment insurance (UI) is a state-administered program providing temporary financial assistance to eligible workers who become unemployed through no fault of their own, funded through employer contributions. The New York Unemployment Insurance Law, enacted in 1935 and codified at Article 18 of the Labor Law, implements unemployment insurance within New York.

The process for claiming weekly benefits (certifying for benefits), for each week of unemployment while looking for work, begins on last day of that week (Sunday) through the following Saturday (claim window, waiting period, or waiting week). As with most states, the maximum period for receiving benefits is 26 full weeks during a one-year period (benefit year). Generally, eligibility follows federal guidelines, where examples of quitting for good cause include domestic violence, immediate family with illness or disability, spousal employment location changes, where the DOL determines that pay and/or hours of work were reduced substantially, or where the DOL determines the employer did not address a safety hazard. Normally, a labor strike must last for 14 days before claimants are eligible, unless due to a lockout (suspension period).

A department claims adjudicator will make an initial determination of the application. Disputed benefit determinations are initially litigated before administrative law judges (ALJs), and the Unemployment Insurance Appeal Board (UIAB) hears appeals against determinations on issues of eligibility and contribution liability. The department also enforces overpayment recovery and civil penalties when it finds willful misrepresentation or other materially false statements in claims administration.

== Workers' compensation ==
Workers' compensation ensures financial and medical benefits for employees who suffer work-related injuries or illnesses, funded by employer insurance or self-insurance. Enacted in the 1910s, the Workers' Compensation Law implements workers' compensation in New York.

The New York State Insurance Fund (NYSIF) of the department provides workers' compensation and disability insurance. The Workers' Compensation Board (WCB) administers, adjudicates, and enforces the state's workers' compensation laws. The Workers' Compensation Security Fund ensures the continuation of workers' compensation benefits when an insurance carrier becomes insolvent, with funding derived from assessments on insurance carriers' premiums. The New York Compensation Insurance Rating Board (CIRB) is a nonprofit, unincorporated association of insurance carriers and is licensed as the official organization to develop workers' compensation rates.

== Workforce development ==
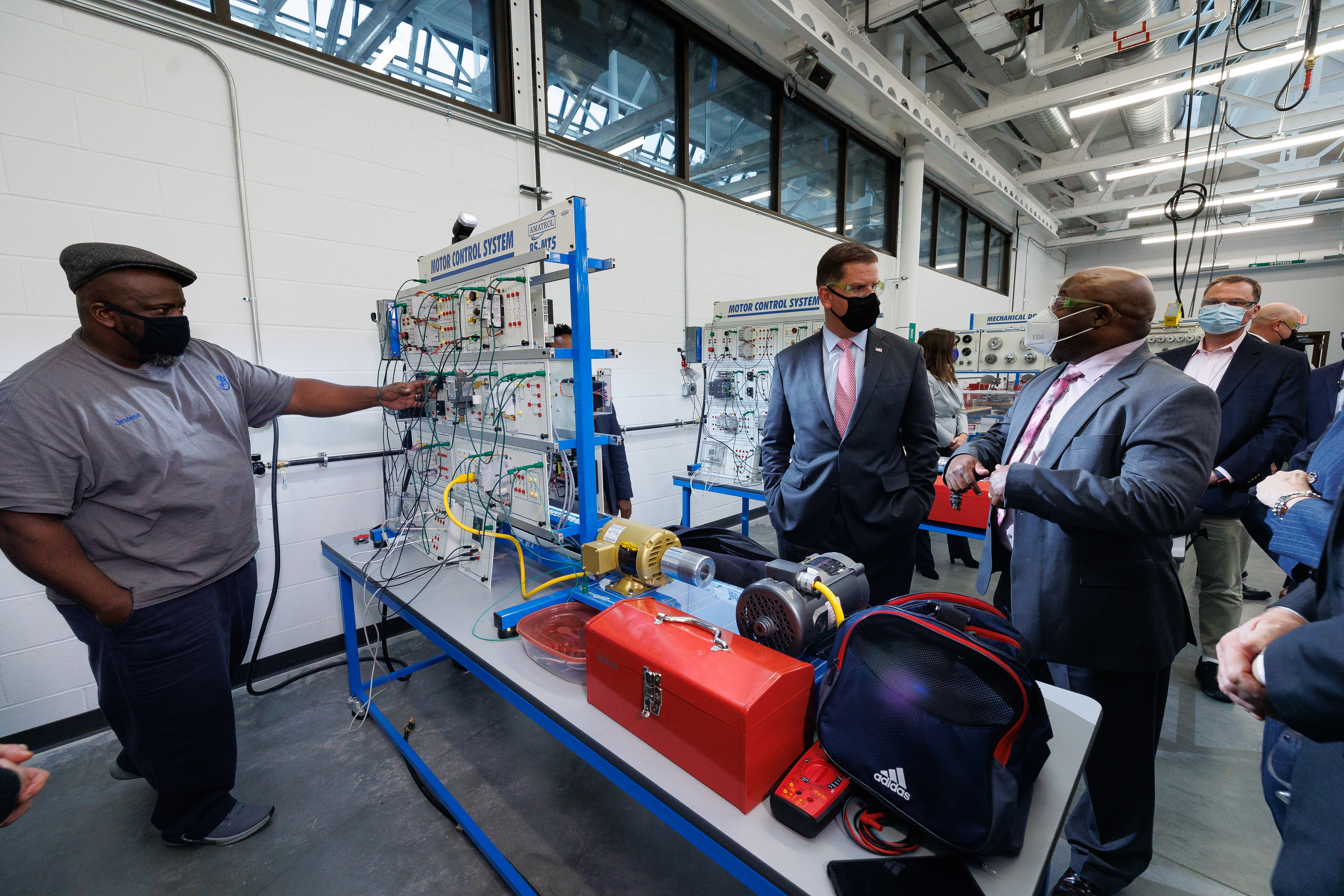
Northland Workforce Training Center in Buffalo

NYSDOL is the state workforce agency that implements the United States Employment Service and federal Workforce Innovation and Opportunity Act. It oversees a network of career centers (one-stop centers or American job centers) throughout the state that offer a range of services, including job search assistance, resume writing help, and access to job training programs. Programs include the Adult, Dislocated Worker, and Youth Programs (Title I programs), as well as apprenticeship programs in a variety of industries including construction, healthcare, and manufacturing; for businesses it supports job posting services, on-the-job training programs, and customized training programs.

Registered apprenticeships are state-registered, nationally-recognized credential programs with an "earn while you learn" model (wages + instruction). Beyond the building trades, the department has expanded apprenticeships into advanced manufacturing, teaching residencies (paying student teachers as apprentices), craft brewing, healthcare, law enforcement, and even jewelry setting.

At the state level, the State Workforce Investment Board (SWIB) coordinates efforts, allocates resources, and provides strategic direction among local workforce development boards, aligned with strategic planning of the ESD economic development regions' regional economic development councils (REDCs).

| Workforce development area | Region |
|---|---|
| New York City | New York City |
| Erie County | Western Region |
| Monroe County | Finger Lakes |
| Oyster Bay-North Hempstead-Glen Cove | Long Island |
| Suffolk County | Long Island |
| Albany-Rensselaer-Schenectady Counties | Capital Region |
| Columbia-Greene Counties | Capital Region |
| Saratoga-Warren-Washington Counties | Capital Region |
| Cayuga-Cortland Counties | Central Region |
| Onondaga County | Central Region |
| Oswego County | Central Region |
| Genesee-Livingston-Orleans-Wyoming Counties (GLOW) | Finger Lakes |
| Ontario-Seneca-Wayne-Yates Counties | Finger Lakes |
| Hempstead-City of Long Beach | Long Island |
| Dutchess County | Mid-Hudson Region |
| Orange County | Mid-Hudson Region |
| Rockland County | Mid-Hudson Region |
| Sullivan County | Mid-Hudson Region |
| Ulster County | Mid-Hudson Region |
| Westchester-Putnam Counties | Mid-Hudson Region |
| Yonkers | Mid-Hudson Region |
| Fulton-Montgomery-Schoharie Counties | Mohawk Valley |
| Herkimer-Madison-Oneida Counties | Mohawk Valley |
| Clinton-Essex-Franklin-Hamilton Counties | North Country |
| Jefferson-Lewis Counties | North Country |
| St. Lawrence County | North Country |
| Broome-Tioga Counties | Southern Tier |
| Chemung-Schuyler-Steuben Counties | Southern Tier |
| Chenango-Delaware-Otsego Counties | Southern Tier |
| Tompkins County | Southern Tier |
| Cattaraugus-Allegany Counties | Western Region |
| Chautauqua County | Western Region |
| Niagara County | Western Region |

== Workforce protections ==
The NYSDOL conducts audits, investigations, and enforces compliance with laws and regulations regarding minimum wage, overtime pay, and wage theft. Key among these is the enforcement of Article 19 of the state Labor Law, which pertains to minimum wage, and Article 6, which covers the payment of wages. The Industrial Board of Appeals provides administrative review of the validity or reasonableness of rules, regulations, or orders issued by the Commissioner.

=== Adequacy of wages ===
The commissioner has the authority to investigate whether minimum wages are sufficient for adequate maintenance and health and can appoint wage boards consisting of employer, employee, and general public representatives who have the power to conduct hearings and investigations with the ability to issue subpoenas.

Starting in 2027, the minimum wage will be adjusted based on the three-year moving average of the Consumer Price Index for Urban Wage Earners and Clerical Workers (CPI-W) for the Northeast Region with the aim to maintain the purchasing power of workers' wages over time. Indicators commonly used at international level to guide assessment of statutory minimum wage adequacy include comparing the gross minimum wage to 60% of the gross median wage and 50% of the gross average wage.

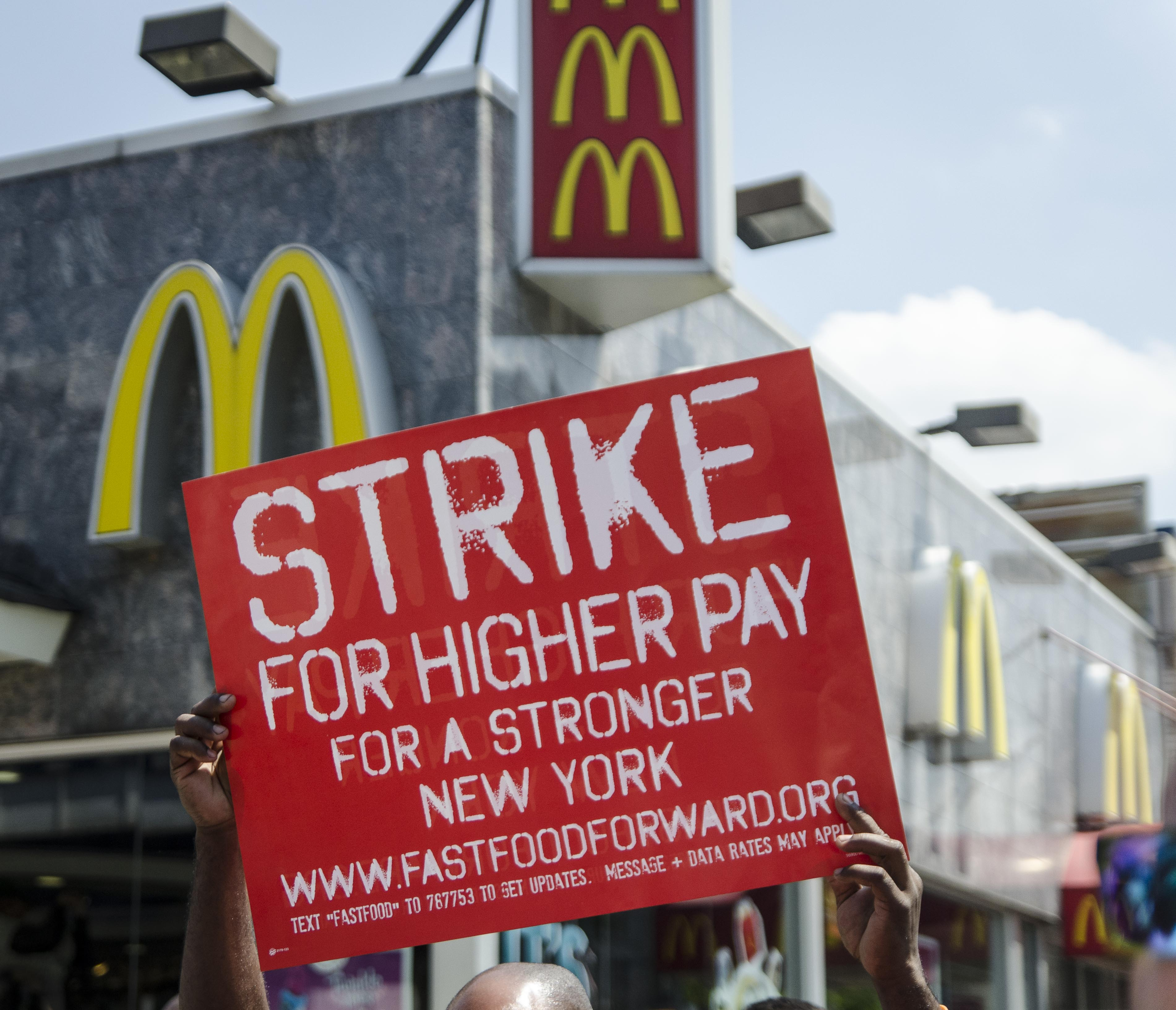
July 2013 Fight for $15 protest

== Collective bargaining ==
The New York State Employment Relations Act (SERA), enacted in 1937 and codified at Article 20 of the Labor Law, was designed to cover employees who don't qualify for protection under the National Labor Relations Act of 1935 or the Railway Labor Act, particularly for small workplaces. The state Taylor Law defines the rights and limitations of unions for public employees. The Public Employment Relations Board (PERB) is responsible for administering the adjudicatory and conciliation provisions of SERA and the Taylor Law.

== Labor market information and statistics ==
The New York State Department of Labor gathers and provides key labor market data through various programs. In collaboration with the US Bureau of Labor Statistics (BLS), NYSDOL participates in several federal-state statistical programs of the Wagner–Peyser Act as the state workforce agency. The NYSDOL makes this labor market data available to public, policymakers, businesses, and other stakeholders, supporting informed decisions about economic and workforce development in New York State.

- Quarterly Census of Employment and Wages (QCEW or ES-202): Provides quarterly comprehensive employment and wage data by industry and county, from employers covered by the state Unemployment Insurance Law.
- Current Employment Statistics (CES): Provides monthly data on employment, hours, and earnings by industry from selected businesses and government agencies. The "establishment survey", it reflects jobs by "place of work" and does not include the self-employed, unpaid family workers, or private household employees.
- Occupational Employment and Wage Statistics (OEWS): Provides employment and wage estimates for over 800 occupations on an annual basis, collected through a semiannual mail survey of non-farm establishments.
- Local Area Unemployment Statistics (LAUS): Provides monthly labor force, employed, unemployment, unemployment rate data at the state and local levels compiled from multiple sources, including the US Census Current Population Survey (CPS), QCEW, and CES surveys.

== History ==
=== Origins and early reforms (1880s–1920s) ===
In 1883, the Bureau of Labor Statistics was established to collect data on labor conditions.

In 1886, the Department of the Factory Inspector was created to enforce woman and child labor laws and workplace safety regulations.

Between February and May 1901, New York State Department of Labor headed by a Commissioner of Labor replaced and incorporated (into bureaus) the commissioner of labor statistics and factory inspector, and state board of mediation and arbitration.

In 1910, a workers' compensation system was created. In 1911 the Court of Appeals (the highest court) struck down the 1910 act as unconstitutional, ruling that it violated due process under the state constitution. The Triangle Shirtwaist Factory fire happened the day after the decision. On July 11, 1913, thirty-three women and two men lost their lives in the Binghamton Clothing Company Fire. The Triangle and Binghamton tragedies gave impetus to labor legislation, and the state constitution was amended on November 4 to permit the still-in-force Workers' Compensation Law.

In 1913, reorganization of the Department of Labor led to the creation of the Industrial Board, an advisory board tasked with increasing awareness of and enforcing the NYS Industrial Code, a set of rules and regulations with the force of law that affects the health, safety and comfort of workers. This Board made the Department of Labor an administrative as well as a regulatory agency. The Division for Industrial Hygiene, for technical research, was also established at this time.

The NYS Legislature consolidated the Workmen’s Compensation Commission with the NYS Department of Labor in 1915. A five-member Industrial Commission, headed by an Industrial Commissioner, was appointed to run the Department, replacing the Commissioner of Labor, the Industrial Board, and the Workmen’s Compensation Commission.

The Industrial Commission created the Bureau of Women in Industry, the precursor to the modern Division of Labor Standards, in 1918.

In 1921, the NYS Legislature reorganized the Department of Labor, placing quasi-judicial and legislative powers in an Industrial Board and assigning administrative matters to a single Industrial Commissioner.

An amendment to the State Constitution in 1926 reorganized the more than 180 scattered departments, bureaus, boards and commissioners of State government into 18 departments, one of which was the Department of Labor.

In 1929, Frances Perkins is appointed by the newly elected New York governor Franklin D. Roosevelt as the inaugural industrial commissioner.

=== The New Deal (1930s) ===
In 1933, the Prevailing Rates of Wage amendment to the NYS Labor Law charged the Industrial Commissioner with determining wages to be paid on all public works of the State (except those done for a city).

After the Wagner–Peyser Act of 1933 created the United States Employment Service and the Social Security Act of 1935 authorized unemployment insurance for the jobless, NYS DOL created the Division of Unemployment Insurance, which soon merged with the State Employment Service.

The New York Unemployment Insurance Law was enacted in April 1935 and codified at Article 18 of the Labor Law and made employers of 4 people over 13 weeks (or more) liable for taxes, excluding government, agriculture, religious, scientific, literary, or educational organizations, and also authorized state employment districts and offices (to become the New York State Employment Service). A Division of Unemployment Insurance was established within the department to administer the act. The New York Court of Appeals and US Supreme Court (by an evenly split court) upheld the law in 1936.

The New York State Employment Relations Act, also known as the State Labor Relations Act, SERA, or the Little Wagner Act, and codified at Article 20 of the Labor Law, was enacted in 1937 and modeled after the National Labor Relations Act of 1935.

In 1937, the rule-making and variance-granting power of the DOL's Industrial Board was transferred to the Board of Standards and Appeals. The Industrial Board retained jurisdiction only in adjudicating workmen’s compensation cases in the first instance. The Labor Relations Board was established to supervise labor-management relations. The State Board of Mediation was set up to mediate settlements in labor disputes, carrying on services that had been provided since 1886. And the state passed a minimum wage law protecting women and minors.

The Fair Labor Standards Act of 1938 set a national minimum wage standard and a forty hour work week, and in this same year, an amendment to the New York State Constitution established a "Bill of Rights" for working people. The Unemployment Insurance Appeal Board (UIAB) was also established in 1938, to hear appeals from claimants or employers dissatisfied with departmental administrative determinations.

=== Expansion (1940s–1970s) ===
In January 1942, for the duration of World War II, the President of the United States absorbed the New York State Employment Service into the National Manpower Program.

In 1944, New York State’s Minimum Wage Law was amended to include men.

In 1945, the NYS Industrial Board was replaced by the Workmen’s Compensation Board.

The National Manpower Program ended in 1946, and control of the Employment Service was returned to New York State. Also in this year, New York first passed laws regulating the hours which minors could work during non-school hours.

The Taylor Law (Public Employees Fair Employment Act) of 1967 defines the rights and limitations of unions for public employees.

In 1971, both Unemployment Services and Manpower Services, formerly the part of the Division of Employment, became part of the Department of Labor.

The federal government passed the Comprehensive Employment and Training Act (CETA), under which allocation of funds is locally oriented, in 1973, and in 1974, NYSDOL began implementing the act in New York State.

In 1975, the Board of Standards and Appeals was abolished and replaced with the newly-established Industrial Board of Appeals. The power to adopt rules relating to health and safety standards was transferred to the industrial commissioner, while the board was empowered to revoke, amend, or modify any adopted rule, regulation, or order.

The US Occupational Safety and Health Administration (OSHA) takes over enforcement of federal safety and health regulation in the private sector. The State Labor Department retains responsibility where no federal standards apply and enforces safety and health regulations in the public sector. Under contract with OSHA, DOL offers the On-site Consultation Program.

In 1978, the Workmen's Compensation Board was renamed the Workers' Compensation Board.

=== Modernization (1980s–1990s) ===
In 1980, the Public Employee Safety and Health Act (PESH Act) authorized an occupational safety and health program for state and local civil service employees in accordance with the federal Occupational Safety and Health Act, which excluded them, with administrative review through the Industrial Board of Appeals and judicial review through the Supreme Court under Article 78 of the CPLR.

In 1982, the title of the head of the department was changed from Industrial Commissioner to Commissioner of Labor.

The Job Training Partnership Act (JTPA) of 1982 replaced the CETA. The new law provided localities with federal funds for employment training.

In 1987, DOL began its regulation of asbestos control activities in the state.

In 1991, New York State became the first state in the U.S. to require both school and parental permission for teenagers to work past 10 p.m. In 1992, it also became the first state in the U.S. to establish enforceable guidelines to protect public employees against tuberculosis in the workplace.

Also in 1991, the Labor Relations Board and the State Board of Mediation were disestablished and their functions merged into the newly-established State Employment Relations Board (SERB). The State Labor Relations Act of 1937 was also renamed to the State Employment Relations Act (SERA).

The NYS Department of Labor debuted the first iteration of its website in 1995.

In 1996, in an effort to reform Workers' Compensation, the NYS Legislature passed Governor George Pataki’s New York Employment, Safety and Security Act, which significantly reduced workers' compensation costs for employers.

Also at this time, "hot goods" legislation prohibited sale or distribution of apparel produced in sweatshops.

The Welfare Reform Act of 1997 implemented the federal Personal Responsibility and Work Opportunity Act and transferred supervisory responsibility for all public assistance employment programs, including those under Family Assistance (FA, Temporary Assistance for Needy Families), Safety Net Assistance (SNA), and Food Stamp Program, from the Department of Social Services (DSS) to DOL. The welfare reform legislation lead to the formation of the Welfare-To-Work Division, and DOL began testing Claims by Phone, which was the beginning of the current Unemployment Insurance Telephone Claims Centers.

=== 21st century (2000–present) ===
New York State minimum wage was raised to $5.15 per hour and linked to federal minimum wage in 2000.

In 2001, DOL completed the conversion of the Unemployment Insurance program from in-person filing to a new filing system using an Interactive Voice Response systems and a touch-tone phone. Additionally, UI applications went online through the department’s website.

In the wake of the September 11th terrorist attack, DOL mobilized to work with state, federal and NYC agencies to aid in the relief and recovery efforts. With $25 million in National Emergency Grant Funding, NYSDOL was able to provide essential services to victims and dislocated workers.

In the 2003 budget, the Interest Assessment Surcharge was created to pay interest on loans from the (Unemployment Trust Fund) Federal Unemployment Account.

In 2005, the Department of Labor’s Apparel Industry Task Force was expanded into the Fair Wages Task Force, and its enforcement was expanded to include restaurants, laundries, grocery stores and gardening services. The Fair Wages Task Force was also created at this time, to investigate industries where wages were low and workers were likely to be exploited. In its first year of existence, the Fair Wage Task force completed more than 400 investigations and found more than $5.3 million due to nearly 5,100 underpaid workers.

In 2007, the final increment of the NYS Minimum Wage increase from $5.15 to $7.25, and Workers’ Compensation Reform took effect. NYS UI claimants were issued Direct Payment Cards for Unemployment Insurance benefits, and recipients also were given the option of receiving benefit payments via Direct Deposit, rather than via a Direct Payment Card. Also in 2007, the Bureau of Immigrant Workers’ Rights (now the Division of Immigrant Policies and Affairs) was created to address the growing needs of immigrant workers throughout the state.

In 2009, M. Patricia Smith, who later became the Solicitor of the United States Department of Labor, was the labor commissioner.

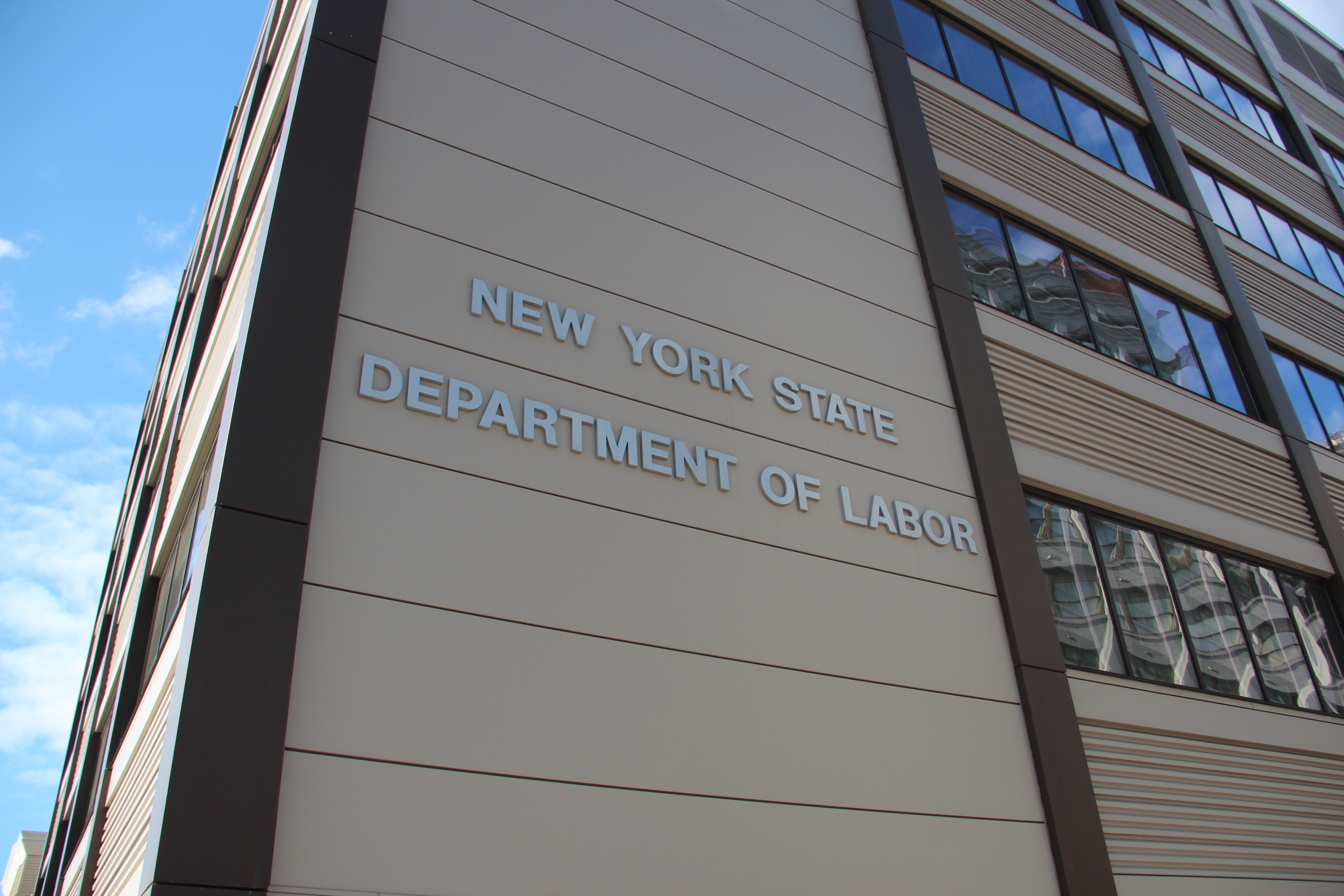
A New York State Department of Labor building in Brooklyn.

2010 saw the passage of both the NYS Construction Industry Fair Play Act, which made it illegal for an employer to misclassify employees as independent contractors or pay employees off the books, and the Domestic Workers Bill of Rights, the first law of its kind in the nation.

In 2010, the State Employment Relations Board was abolished and the Public Employment Relations Board (PERB) became responsible for administering the adjudicatory and conciliation provisions of the New York State Employment Relations Act.

In 2013, Governor Cuomo announced sweeping reforms to New York State's Workers Compensation and Unemployment Insurance programs, which were designed to save employers $1.2 billion.

The NYS Commercial Goods Transportation Industry Fair Play Act went into effect in April 2014. This law created a new standard for determining whether a driver of commercial vehicles who transports goods is an employee or independent contractor.

According to an audit released in June 2014 by State Comptroller Thomas DiNapoli, the Department of Labor did not complete many of its wage theft investigations in a timely manner. As of late August 2013, the DOL had more than 17,000 open cases, consisting of about 9,300 active investigations and more than 7,800 cases pending payment, and of these almost 13,000, or 75%, were at least one year old from initial claim date. In 2013, the DOL had 142 employees statewide, including 85–90 investigators, handling the complaints. By 2015, the caseload had been handled and 85% of investigations were being completed within 6 months. In 2015 alone, the agency had distributed a record $31.5 million to victims of wage theft.

In May 2015, acting labor commissioner Mario Musolino appointed a state wage board to investigate wages for fast food workers. In July, the board issued a report recommending a $15-an-hour minimum wage for fast food workers, and in September 2015 acting commissioner Musolino issued an order accepting the recommendations. Effective December 31, 2015, the department adopted amended codified regulations (12 NYCRR part 146) implementing the report and order.

In 2015, Roberta Reardon, a former AFL–CIO and SAG-AFTRA official, was nominated as the state labor commissioner, and was confirmed by the Senate on June 15, 2016.

In 2016, as part of the 2016–17 State Budget, Governor Cuomo signed legislation enacting a incremental statewide $15 minimum wage plan. On December 31, 2016, the first in a series of wage increases went into effect.

In 2020, tip allowances for employees under the Miscellaneous Wage Order were reduced by 50% by end of June, and eliminated entirely by December 31 (for all industries except hospitality, farmworkers and building service).

As of 27 November 2024, New York owed the United States over $6 billion in outstanding loans from the (Unemployment Trust Fund) Federal Unemployment Account, down from its $10.2 billion peak during the COVID-19 pandemic.

== List of commissioners ==
| Portrait | Name | Years in Service |
|---|---|---|
| | John McMackin | 1901–1905 |
| | Philemon Tecumseh Sherman | 1905–1906 |
| | John Williams | 1907–1913 |
| | James M. Lynch | 1913–1915 |
| | John Mitchell | 1916–1919 |
| | Edward F. Boyle | 1920 |
| | Henry D. Sayer | 1921–1923 |
| | Bernard L. Shientag | 1923–1924 |
| | James A. Hamilton | 1925–1928 |
| | Frances Perkins | 1929–1933 |
| | Elmer F. Andrews | 1933–1938 |
| | Frieda S. Miller | 1938–1942 |
| | Edward Corsi | 1944–1954 |
| | Isador Lubin | 1955–1958 |
| | Martin P. Catherwood | 1959–1970 |
| | Louis L. Levine | 1971–1976 |
| | Philip Ross | 1976–1981 |
| | Lillian Roberts | 1981–1986 |
| | Thomas F. Hartnett | 1987–1991 |
| | John F. Hudacs | 1991–1994 |
| | John E. Sweeney | 1995–1997 |
| | James J. McGowan | 1998–2000 |
| | Linda Angello | 2001–2006 |
| | M. Patricia Smith | 2007–2010 |
| | Colleen Gardner | 2010–2012 |
| | Peter M. Rivera | 2012–2014 |
| | Roberta Reardon | 2014–present |

== See also ==
- New York State Civil Service Commission (Department of Civil Service)
