= Arthur Ross =

Arthur Ross may refer to:

- Arthur Wellington Ross (1846–1901), Canadian politician, educator and lawyer
- Arthur Ross (bishop) (1869–1923), Anglican bishop in Ireland
- Arthur Edward Ross (1870–1952), Canadian politician
- Arthur Ross (cricketer) (1872–?), Irish cricketer
- Arthur Ross (baseball) (1878–1916), American baseball player
- Art Ross (1885–1964), Canadian ice hockey player and general manager of the Boston Bruins, 1924–1953
- J. Arthur Ross (1893–1958), Manitoba politician
- Arthur Dwight Ross (1907–1981), World War II RCAF pilot and George Cross recipient
- Arthur Ross (philanthropist) (1910–2007), American businessman and philanthropist
- Arthur A. Ross (1920–2008), American screenwriter
- Arthur Ross (musician) (1949–1996), songwriter, recording artist and brother of recording artist Diana Ross
- Arthur Ross (commissioner) (1916–1970), commissioner of the U.S. Bureau of Labor Statistics

== See also ==
- Arthur Rose (1634–1704), religious leader
