= List of U.S. states by employment rate =

This is a list of U.S. states and the District of Columbia by Employment-to-population ratio (population 16 and over).

== List ==
U.S. states by net employment rate (% of population 16 and over) 2022
National rank	State	Employment rate in % (total population)	Annual change (%) (▲=rise in employment)
1	Nebraska	68.1	▲0.5
2	North Dakota	67.8	▲1.3
—	District of Columbia	67.4	▲3.0
3	Utah	67.1	▲1.1
4	South Dakota	66.8	0.0
5	Colorado	66.3	▲1.9
5	Iowa	66.3	▲1.5
5	Minnesota	66.3	▲1.4
8	Kansas	64.6	▲0.4
9	New Hampshire	64.5	▲0.9
10	Wisconsin	63.1	▼0.1
10	Michigan	63.1	▲1.5
12	Virginia	63.0	▲1.8
13	Massachusetts	62.7	▲1.2
14	Connecticut	62.8	▲3.6
14	Maryland	62.8	▲1.3
16	Alaska	61.6	▲2.0
16	Indiana	61.6	▲1.1
18	Illinois	61.5	▲2.2
18	New Jersey	61.5	▲2.7
18	Vermont	61.5	▲1.6
21	Idaho	61.4	▲0.7
21	Montana	61.4	▲1.2
21	Texas	61.4	▲1.5
21	Washington	61.4	▲1.5
21	Wyoming	61.4	▲0.7
26	Rhode Island	61.3	▲1.2
27	Missouri	61.1	▲0.9
28	Oregon	60.2	▲1.4
—	United States	60.0	▲1.4
29	Georgia	59.6	▲0.3
30	Arizona	59.3	▲1.1
30	California	59.3	▲2.7
32	Pennsylvania	59.1	▲1.4
32	Oklahoma	59.1	▲0.8
34	Ohio	59.0	▲0.8
35	North Carolina	58.7	▲2.2
36	Hawaii	58.1	▲2.1
37	Nevada	57.9	▲2.0
37	Tennessee	57.9	▲0.4
39	Delaware	57.7	0.0
39	New York	57.7	▲2.4
41	Florida	57.6	▲2.1
42	Maine	56.8	▼0.4
43	Louisiana	56.5	▲1.8
44	Kentucky	55.6	▲0.8
45	Arkansas	55.6	▲1.2
46	Alabama	55.5	▲0.8
47	South Carolina	54.7	▼0.1
48	New Mexico	54.2	▲1.7
49	Mississippi	52.7	▲0.6
50	West Virginia	52.5	▲1.3

== See also ==
- List of U.S. states and territories by unemployment rate
- Job creation index
- JOLTS report
