= Erica Groshen =

American economist and civil servant

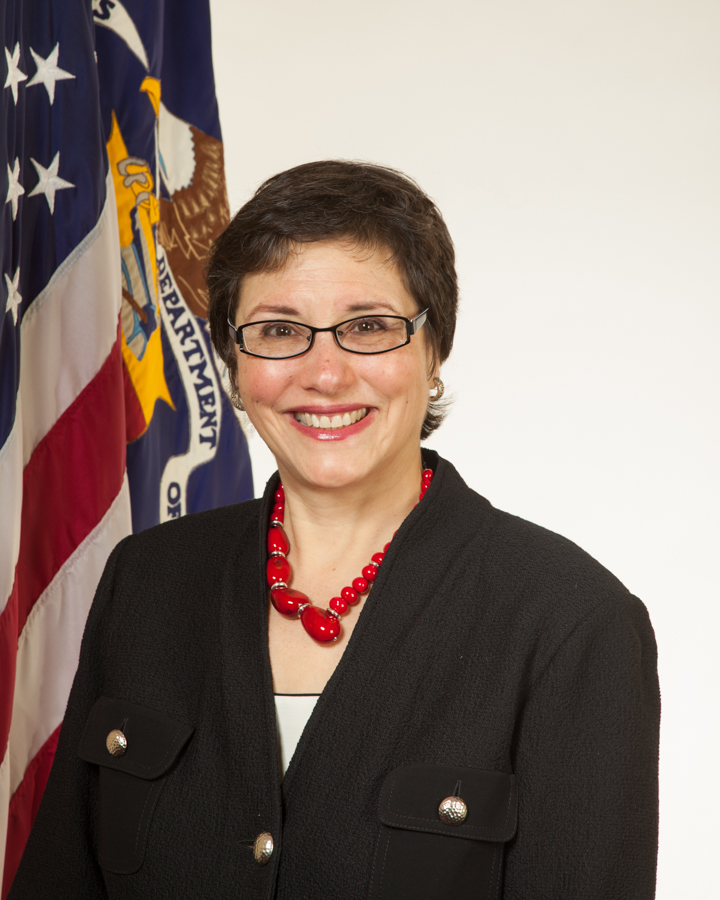

Commissioner of Labor Statistics
- In office January 28, 2013 – January 27, 2017
- President: Barack Obama; Donald Trump
- Preceded by: John Galvin (Acting)
- Succeeded by: William Wiatrowski (Acting)

Personal details
- Born: Erica Lynn Groshen; August 6, 1954 (age 72)
- Education: University of Wisconsin, Madison (BS); Harvard University (MA, PhD)

Erica Lynn Groshen (born August 6, 1954) is the former Commissioner of Labor Statistics and head of the U.S. Bureau of Labor Statistics (BLS), the independent, principal fact-finding agency for the U.S. government in the broad fields of labor economics and statistics, inflation, and productivity. BLS is part of the U.S. Department of Labor.

== Education ==
Groshen received a bachelor's of science degree in economics and mathematics from the University of Wisconsin-Madison and a Ph.D. in economics from Harvard University.

== Career ==
Groshen was nominated for the BLS post in February 2012 and confirmed unanimously by the U.S. Senate in January 2013. Her term ended on January 27, 2017.

Previously, Groshen served as a vice president of the Federal Reserve Bank of New York. Groshen's research focuses on jobless recoveries, regional labor markets, wage rigidity and dispersion, the male-female wage differential, service-sector employment, and the role of employers in labor market outcomes. She co-authored the book How New is the “New Employment Contract”? from the W.E. Upjohn Institute Press and co-edited Structural Changes in U.S. Labor Markets: Causes and Consequences, from M.E. Sharpe, Inc. She has published numerous papers in academic and Federal Reserve journals and co-led the sixteen-country International Wage Flexibility Project. She was a founding editor of the New York Fed's Liberty Street Economics Blog and also an editor of the Current Issues in Economic and Finance and Economic Policy Review publication series.

She has served as a member of the BLS Data Users' Advisory Committee and the Census Bureau's 2010 Census Advisory Committee and also as an American Economic Association representative to the Census Advisory Committee of Professional Associations. She was also a Research Fellow of the IZA Institute of Labor Economics, a private independent economic research institute focused on the analysis of global labor markets and served on the Board of Reviewers for the journal Industrial Relations from 1991 until 2013.

From 2006 to 2010, Groshen was the Director of Regional Affairs at the New York Fed, leading its efforts to connect with the business, education, and policy communities in the 2nd Federal Reserve District. She helped lead initiatives to mitigate the impact of mortgage foreclosures on the region and the Federal Reserve System's Mortgage Outreach and Research Efforts. On behalf of the New York Fed, she initiated the effort to form the consortium of thirteen research institutions that created the New York Census Research Data Center at Baruch College in 2006.

In 1999–2000, Groshen visited the Bank for International Settlements in Basel Switzerland. Prior to that, she served as head of domestic research and of international research in the Research Group at the New York Fed. Before joining the New York Fed in 1994, Groshen was a visiting assistant professor of economics at Barnard College at Columbia University and an economist at the Federal Reserve Bank of Cleveland, where she focused on employment and regional issues.

After her term as Commissioner of Labor Statistics, Groshen joined the Cornell University ILR School as a Senior Economics Advisor and W.E. Upjohn Institute as a research fellow. She currently serves on the Federal Economic Statistics Advisory Committee and the National Academies of Sciences, Engineering and Medicine's Committee on National Statistics, and as Chair of the STARs Insights Advisory Panel.

== Recognition ==
Groshen was elected as a Fellow of the American Statistical Association in 2020. In 2017, the Labor and Employment Relations Association gave her their Susan C. Eaton Outstanding Scholar-Practitioner Award "in recognition of outstanding research, teaching, and practice emphasizing the value of bringing together the academic and practitioner communities."
