= Isador Lubin =

American economist

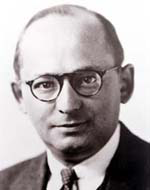

Commissioner of U.S. Bureau of Labor Statistics
- In office July 1933 – January 1946
- President: Franklin Delano Roosevelt; Harry S. Truman
- Preceded by: Ethelbert Stewart
- Succeeded by: Aryness Joy Wickens (Acting)

Personal details
- Born: 9 June 1896
- Died: 6 July 1978 (aged 82)
- Children: Alice Lubin Everitt; Ann Lubin Buttenwieser
- Education: Institute of Economics, later made part of the Brookings Institution

Isador Lubin (9 June 1896 – 6 July 1978) was the head of the U.S. Bureau of Labor Statistics from 1933 to 1946, and president of the American Statistical Association in 1946.

== Career ==
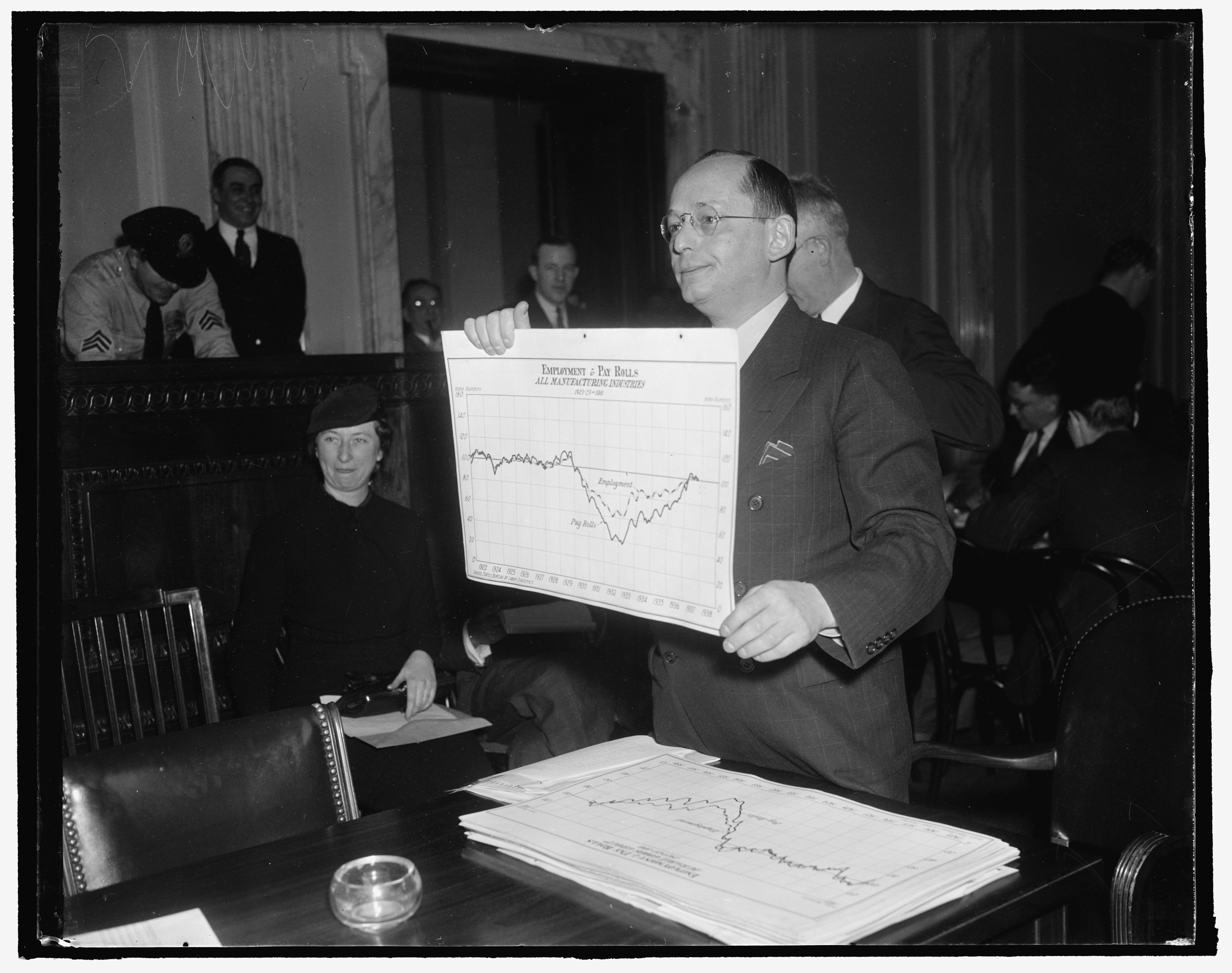
Isador Lubin in 1937

During the First World War, at the U.S. Food Administration, Lubin analyzed labor and price policy related to food production for the Allied Nations. Later at the War Industries Board’s Price Section, he studied the effect of price shifts on the output of the petroleum and rubber industries.

He was as an instructor at the Institute of Economics and earned a Ph.D. there in 1926. It became part of the Brookings Institution in 1927. Lubin's book Miners' Wages and the Cost of Coal was accepted as a dissertation.

"In 1932, as adviser to Senator Robert M. La Follette Jr., he pioneered the notion of government responsibility for the national accounts."

Lubin was appointed head of the Bureau of Labor Statistics (BLS) by Frances Perkins in July 1933 and stayed in the position until January 1946. For much of this time, Lubin had an office in the White House's West Wing "and served as special statistical adviser to President Franklin Roosevelt." Lubin was sometimes described as a member of President Roosevelt's "brain trust." In 1944 he was elected as a Fellow of the American Statistical Association.

In 1941 Lubin authorized BLS to start a research group at Harvard University directed by Wassily Leontief which constructed the first official table of U.S. industry inputs and outputs." In 1945, Roosevelt appointed Lubin as Minister to the Allied Reparations Commission.

"In his presidential address to the American Statistical Society in January [1947], Lubin emphasized [the role] of statistics in modern economic society and the value to the free world of pertinent data."

Lubin was appointed the Industrial Commissioner of New York state from 1955 to 1958 by Governor W. Averell Harriman.

== Personal and legacy ==
In 1952 Lubin married the former Carol Riegelman (1909–2005), a longtime consultant to the UN/ILO. He had two daughters by a previous marriage to Ann Shumaker Lubin, the editor of "Progressive Education" and co-author of the book, "The Child-Centered School" (1928): Alice Lubin Everitt and Ann Lubin Buttenwieser.

Fellowships named for Dr. Lubin were established at Brandeis University and The New School.

== Further information ==
- Lewis Lansky. 1976. Isador Lubin: The Ideas and Career of a New Deal Labor Economist. Case Western Reserve University. Dissertation.
