= Skill (labor) =

Aspect of employee classification

Skill is a measure of the amount of worker's expertise, specialization, wages, and supervisory capacity. Skilled workers are generally more trained, higher paid, and have more responsibilities than unskilled workers.

Skilled workers have long had historical import (see division of labour) as masons, carpenters, blacksmiths, bakers, brewers, coopers, printers and other occupations that are economically productive. Skilled workers were often politically active through their craft guilds.

== Relative demand of skilled labor ==
One of the factors that has increased the relative demand for skilled labor is the introduction of computers. In order to operate computers, workers must build up their human capital in order to learn how such a piece of machinery works. Thus, there is an increase in the demand for skilled labor. In addition to the technological change of computers, the introduction of electricity also replaces man power (unskilled labor) which alters the demand for labor skills.

Technology, however, is not the only factor. Trade and the effects of globalization also play roles in affecting the relative demand for skilled labor. For example, a developed country purchasing imports from a developing country, which then replaces products made with domestic, low-skills labor. This, in turn, decreases the demand for low-skills workers in the developed country. Both of these factors may increase the wages of highly skilled workers in the developed country.

== Foundation, transferable, and technical and vocational skills ==
The EFA Global Monitoring Report 2012, proposes a useful approach to different types of skills in relation to the world of work. It identifies three main types of skills that all young people need – foundation, transferable, and technical and vocational skills – and the contexts in which they may be acquired.

=== Foundation skills ===
At their most elemental, foundation skills are the literacy and numeracy skills necessary for getting work that pays enough to meet daily needs. These foundations are also a prerequisite for engaging in further education and training, and for acquiring transferable skills and technical and vocational skills.

=== Transferable skills ===
Finding and keeping work require a broad range of skills that can be transferred and adapted to different work needs and environments. Transferable skills include analysing problems and reaching appropriate solutions, communicating ideas and information effectively, being creative, showing leadership and conscientiousness, and demonstrating entrepreneurial capabilities. Such skills are nurtured to some extent outside the school environment. They can, however, be further developed through education and training.

=== Technical and vocational skills ===
Many jobs require specific technical know-how, whether related to growing vegetables, using a sewing machine, engaging in bricklaying or carpentry, or working on a computer in an office. Technical and vocational skills can be acquired through work placement programs linked to secondary schooling and formal technical and vocational education, or through work-based training, including traditional apprenticeships and agricultural cooperatives.

== See also ==
- Automation
- Blue-collar worker
- Menial job
- Deskilling
- Human capital
- Scientific management
- Knowledge sharing
- Skilled worker
- Skilled through alternative routes
- Unionization

== Sources ==
This article incorporates text from a free content work. Licensed under CC-BY-SA IGO 3.0 (license statement/permission). Text taken from Rethinking Education: Towards a global common good?, 41, Box 5, UNESCO. UNESCO.
