= Nonfarm payrolls =

American economic employment indicator

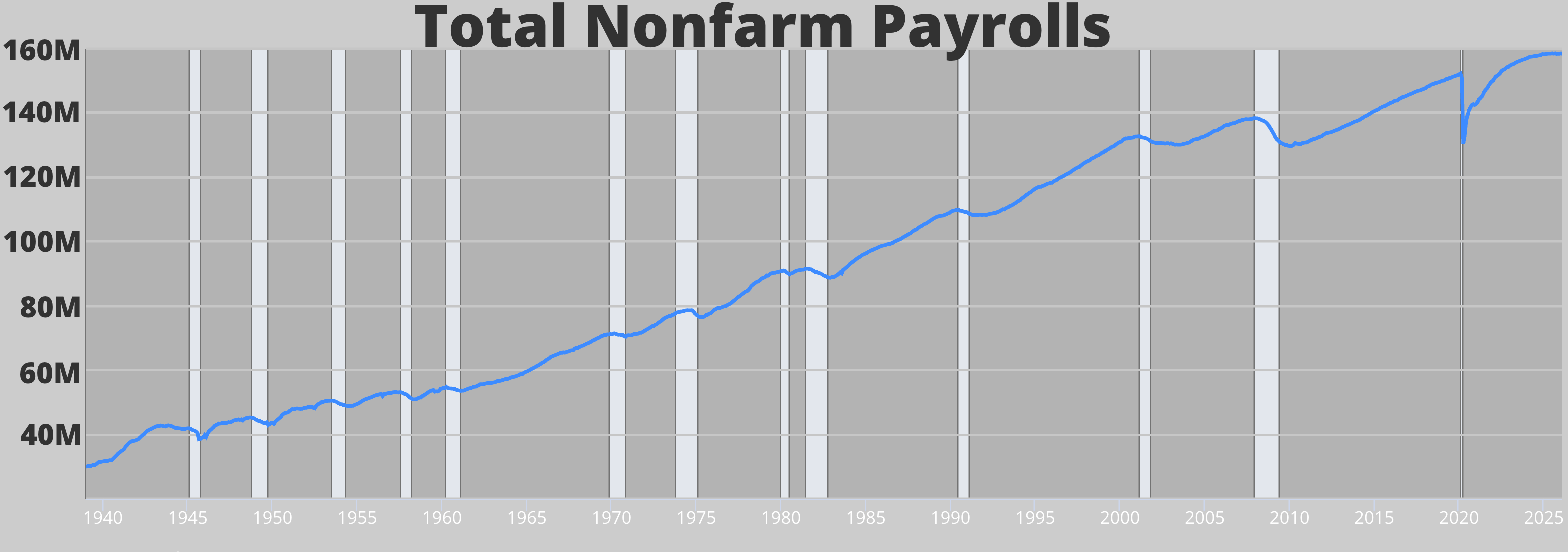
Total Nonfarm Payrolls

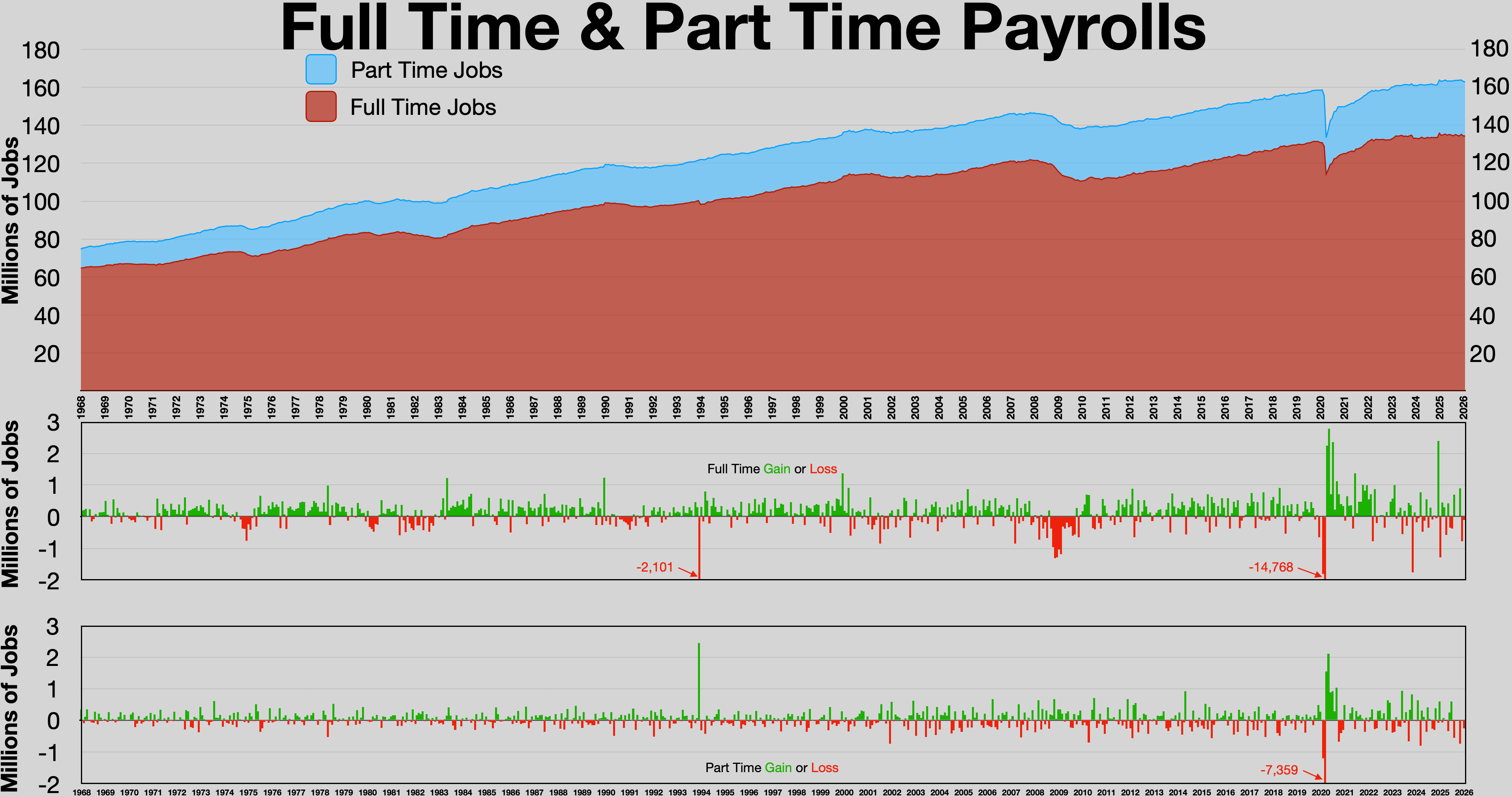
Total full time and part time payrolls Part time jobs Full time jobs

Nonfarm payroll employment is a compiled name for goods, construction and manufacturing companies in the US. Approximately 80% of the workforce is accounted for nonfarm payrolls and it excludes farm workers, private household employees, actively serving military or non-profit organization employees. Approximately 131,000 businesses and government agencies, which amounts to around 670,000 worksites, are surveyed on a monthly basis.

It is an influential statistic and economic indicator released monthly by the United States Department of Labor as part of a comprehensive report on the state of the labor market.

The financial assets most affected by the nonfarm payroll (NFP) data include the US dollar, equities and gold. The markets react very quickly and most of the time in a very volatile fashion around the time the NFP data is released. The short-term market moves indicate that there is a very strong correlation between the NFP data and the strength of the US dollar. Historical price movement data shows a small negative correlation between the NFP data and the US dollar Index.

The Bureau of Labor Statistics releases preliminary data on the third Friday after the conclusion of the reference week, i.e., the week which includes the 12th of the month, at 8:30 a.m. Eastern Time; typically this date occurs on the first Friday of the month. Nonfarm payroll is included in the monthly Employment Situation or informally the jobs report.

The figure released is the change in nonfarm payrolls (NFP), compared to the previous month, and is usually between +10,000 and +250,000 during non-recessional times. That number is meant to represent the number of jobs added or lost in the economy over the last month, not including jobs relating to the farming industry.

== Interpretation for the economy ==
In general, increases in employment means both that businesses are hiring which means they are growing and that the newly-employed people have money to spend on goods and services, which further fuels growth. The opposite is true for decreases in employment. Simultaneously, a robust job market could imply that the economy is expanding at a rapid pace, which may result in inflationary pressures, particularly in the form of higher wages. If the employment numbers are strong, Fed officials might contemplate raising key interest rates as a measure to control inflation. Based on the survey results, the Federal Reserve could determine its course of action regarding monetary policy.

== Interpretation for financial markets ==
US employment data showed sustained weakness throughout 2011. The jobs market has become an area of key focus for investors and market participants since US Federal Reserve ties monetary policies with economic performance, such as the size of quantitative easing programme. For this reason and in this environment the market is particularly sensitive to significant NFP releases.

While the overall number of jobs added or lost in the economy is obviously an important current indicator of what the economic situation is, the report also includes several other pieces of data that can move financial markets:

1. What the unemployment rate is in the economy as a percentage of the overall workforce. This is an important part of the report as the number of people out of work is a good indication of the overall health of the economy, and this is a number that is watched by the Fed as when it becomes low (generally anything below 5%) inflation is expected to start to creep up as businesses have to pay up to hire good workers and increase prices as a result. This initial rise in prices may mean that workers demand higher wages (especially as the economy reaches full employment) causing further inflation. In macroeconomics, this is known as the price/wage spiral.

2. Which sectors the increase or decrease in jobs came from. This can give traders a heads up on which sectors of the economy may be primed for growth as companies in those sectors such as housing add jobs.

3. Average hourly earnings. This is an important component because if the same number of people are employed but are earning more or less money for that work, this has basically the same effect as if people had been added or subtracted from the labor force.

4. Revisions of previous nonfarm payrolls releases. An important component of the report which can move markets as traders re-price growth expectations based on the revision to the previous number.

== See also ==
- Economic indicator
- Gross domestic product
- List of recessions in the United States
- JOLTS report
- Sahm rule
