= Ewan Clague =

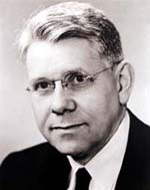

Commissioner of the U.S. Bureau of Labor Statistics
- In office August 1946 – Sept 1965
- President: Harry S. Truman; Dwight D. Eisenhower; John F. Kennedy; Lyndon B. Johnson
- Preceded by: Aryness Joy Wickens (Acting)
- Succeeded by: Arthur Ross

Personal details
- Born: 1896 Prescott, Washington
- Died: April 1987 Bethesda, Maryland

Ewan Clague (1896–1987) was the commissioner of the U.S. Bureau of Labor Statistics (BLS) from 1946 to 1965.

In 1952 he was elected as a Fellow of the American Statistical Association.

== Early life and education ==
Clague was born to Manx immigrant parents and grew up on a homestead in Washington state. Clague graduated from the University of Washington and earned a doctorate from the University of Wisconsin.
