= Alternative employment arrangements =

In economics, alternative employment arrangements are categorized in four types of alternative employment arrangements: independent contractors, on-call workers, temporary help agency workers, and workers provided by contract firms.

== See also ==
- Bureau of Labor Statistics
