= Kate Claghorn =

American sociologist and Progressive Era activist

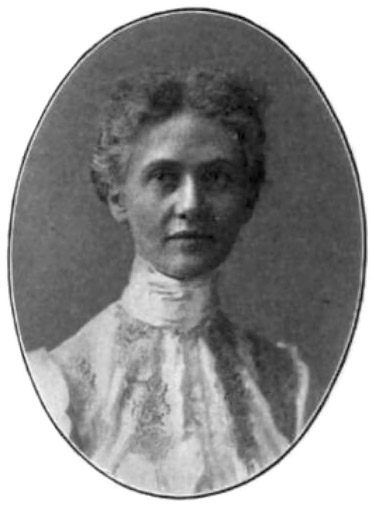
- Kate Claghorn, circa 1912
- Born: Aurora, Illinois, U.S.
- Died: May 22, 1938 (aged 74)
- Resting place: Maple Grove Cemetery
- Education: Bryn Mawr College; Yale University (PhD)
- Scientific career
- Workplaces: New York School of Applied Philanthropy
- Thesis: Law, Nature, and Convention, a Study in Political Theory

Kate Holladay Claghorn (c. 1864 – May 22, 1938) was an American sociologist, economist, statistician, legal scholar, and Progressive Era activist, who became one of the founders of the National Association for the Advancement of Colored People.

== Early life, education and career ==
Claghorn was born on December 12, 1863 or February 12, 1864 in Aurora, Illinois, but grew up in New York City. She earned a bachelor's degree in 1892 from Bryn Mawr College, and completed a Ph.D. from Yale University in 1896. She was part of only the third cohort of women doctorates from Yale – the school opened admission to women in 1892 and the first seven graduated in 1894 – and she became the first to receive her degree publicly, at Yale's commencement ceremony. At Bryn Mawr she studied political economy under Franklin Henry Giddings, and at Yale she studied "industrial history, advanced economics, political science, and anthropology" with William Graham Sumner and Arthur Twining Hadley; her dissertation was entitled Law, Nature, and Convention, a Study in Political Theory.

Claghorn became the first paid secretary-treasurer of the Association of Collegiate Alumnae, the predecessor organization to the American Association of University Women, in 1898. She worked briefly for the US Industrial Commission, the Economic Year Book, and the US Census Office before joining the New York Tenement House Department as assistant registrar in 1902; she was promoted to registrar in 1906. Her $3000 salary made her the highest-paid female civil servant in New York. A magazine story at the time wrote:

Miss Kate Claghorn is holding down a man's job in the tenement house department because there was no man smart enough to fill it. Twice she stood the test of an examination framed in Columbia University, which was designed, if anything, to eliminate women from the competition, but which in the end eliminated the men.

In 1912 she took a position as a lecturer and head of the Department of Social Research at the New York School of Applied Philanthropy (later to become the New York School of Social Work), where she taught courses on immigration and statistics. She remained at the school until 1932.

She died on 22 May 1938 of a cerebral hemorrhage and was buried in Maple Grove Cemetery.

== Contributions and opinions ==
Claghorn was a frequent writer for magazines, and published her first book, College Training for Women, in 1896.

In a report for the New York Tenement House Department in 1901, Claghorn decried newspaper propaganda linking immigration to poverty, and noted the particular enthusiasm for schooling displayed by Jewish immigrant children. In a study that she wrote in 1904 for the department, Claghorn foresaw that new groups of immigrants from southern and eastern Europe were not more likely to become impoverished, in the long term, than the previous immigrants from Britain and Germany.

Another of her books was Juvenile Delinquency in Rural New York (U. S. Department of labor. Children's bureau, no. 32, 1918). As well as surveying this issue, it recommended moving juvenile cases from the local justice of the peace to a county juvenile court, changing the juvenile court system to make it more accessible, adding a separate juvenile detention system instead of institutionalizing delinquents, and increasing the age of adulthood from 16 to 18.

In her 1923 book, The Immigrants' Day in Court, Claghorn argued that the legal aid available at the time was inadequate, focusing primarily on legal minutiae rather than on understanding the actual issues affecting their clients, and that it inappropriately excluded female attorneys from serving. She also reported on the injustice caused by inadequate translation for non-English-speaking legal clients, and on the sexual harassment of female workers by job placement workers and supervisors. Writing about this book in 2003, British historians Kristofer Allerfeldt and Jeremy Black called it "the one significant contemporary study of the immigrant and the American legal system".

== Associations ==
While working at the Tenement House Department, Claghorn became the founding treasurer of the Equality League of Self-Supporting Women (later to become the Women's Political Union), an organization founded in 1907 by suffragette Harriot Eaton Stanton Blatch as "the political wing of the Women's Trade Union League".

In 1909 Claghorn was one of 60 signers of the "Call for the Lincoln Emancipation Conference to Discuss Means for Securing Political and Civil Equality for the Negro", which became the founding document of the National Association for the Advancement of Colored People.

Claghorn chaired a committee of the American Institute of Criminal Law and Criminology on connections between crime and immigration, which produced its report in 1917.

In 1918 she was elected as a Fellow of the American Statistical Association. She was the first woman to be so honored, and the only one until 1937 when Aryness Joy Wickens joined the rolls of association fellows.
