= Ethelbert Stewart =

American labor statistician

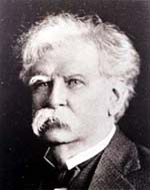

Commissioner of the U.S. Bureau of Labor Statistics
- In office April 1921 – June 1932
- President: Woodrow Wilson; Warren G. Harding; Calvin Coolidge; Herbert Hoover
- Preceded by: Royal Meeker
- Succeeded by: Charles E. Baldwin (Acting)

Personal details
- Born: 1857 Cook County, Illinois
- Died: 1936 (aged 78–79)

Ethelbert Stewart (1857–1936) was the commissioner of the U.S. Bureau of Labor Statistics (BLS) from 1921 to 1932.

Stewart worked as a coffin-maker, then founded and edited labor newspapers. He was made the commissioner of labor for the state of Illinois in the 1880s. He was made deputy commissioner of the BLS in 1913 along with other roles in the U.S. Department of Labor. In that position he had a public role in how the organization should track women workers, child labor, and occupational injuries and illnesses. In the fall of 1913 he mediated a coal mining dispute involving the Rockefeller interests in Colorado and helped resolve the Indianapolis streetcar strike of 1913. It was hard to keep the Bureau staffed during World War I and Stewart advocated offering pensions to civil servants. In 1920 he was elected as a Fellow of the American Statistical Association.

When commissioner Royal Meeker left in 1920, Stewart was nominated by President Woodrow Wilson to take the top role, newly elected President Warren Harding re-nominated him, and Stewart was confirmed in 1921. The Bureau began issuing productivity statistics in this period, and increased coverage of wholesale prices, employment and unemployment, and industrial safety statistics.

== Publications and archives ==
- Ethelbert Stewart. "1913=100", Monthly Labor Review 15:2 (Aug. 1922), pp. 11–12.
- Stewart's archives are kept at the University of North Carolina, Chapel Hill.
