= Julius Shiskin =

American economist (1912–1978)

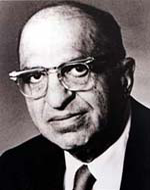
Julius Shiskin

Julius Shiskin (October 13, 1912 – October 28, 1978) was an American economist. He is known for his contributions to establishing rules in the field of economic statistics. His 1974 unofficial rule-of-thumb definition of a recession continues to be considered by many as the official definition. He authored two books and numerous articles in the field of statistics, and served as the ninth U.S. Commissioner of the Bureau of Labor Statistics from 1973 until his death.

== Family and education ==
Shiskin was born in New York City on October 13, 1912, and completed his primary education in New Jersey where he graduated from Rutgers University. He was married to Frances Levine and they had two daughters, Laura and Carol.

== Career ==
Shiskin taught economics and statistics at the Rutgers university between the years of 1934 and 1938. From 1938 through 1942, he worked as a staff assistant for the National Bureau of Economic Research, and from 1942 to 1945 he was the chief economist for the War Production Board.

In 1945 he joined the Census Bureau, where he held positions of Chief of the Economic Research and Analysis Division and assistant director for Program Planning and Evaluation at the Census Bureau. He played a crucial role in the creation of a computerised technique for seasonally adjusting economic time series and was a significant contributor to the advancement of the business-cycle statistics program. Shiskin joined the Office of Management and Budget in 1969 and assumed the role of Commissioner of Labour Statistics in 1973. While he was in this post, the United States experienced the most severe economic downturn since the Great Depression. Shiskin died on October 28, 1978.

== Recession definition ==
In a 1974 New York Times opinion piece about recessions, Shiskin wrote:

The Bureau of Labor Statistics's definition of a recession is, however, known to only a small number of specialists in business cycle studies. Many people use a much simpler definition—a two‐quarter decline in real GDP. While this definition is simplistic, it has worked quite well in the past.

Many have since maintained that this two-quarter rule-of-thumb is the official definition of a recession in the United States. Since 1978, however, the Business Cycle Dating Committee of the National Bureau of Economic Research has "called" recession starts and ends, which it defines as "a significant decline in economic activity that is spread across the economy and that lasts more than a few months" and involves examination of the depth, diffusion, and duration of the decline.

== Memorial Award for Economic Statistics ==
The annual Julius Shiskin Award for Outstanding Achievement in Economic Statistics is sponsored by the Washington Statistical Society, American Statistical Association, and National Association of Business Economists.
