= Occupational Employment and Wage Statistics =

Semi annual survey of businesses conducted by Bureau of Labor Statistics

The Occupational Employment and Wage Statistics) (OEWS) survey is a semi-annual survey of approximately 200,000 non-farm business establishments conducted by the Bureau of Labor Statistics (BLS), headquartered in Washington, DC with six regional offices and one office in each state. Until the spring of 2021 it was officially called the Occupational Employment Statistics (OES), and it is often cited or documented with that name or abbreviation.

== Purpose ==
The OEWS survey is designed to produce estimates of employment and wages by occupation by four-digit North American Industry Classification System (NAICS) in each State-level Metropolitan Statistical Area (MSA-“urban”) or Balance-of-State (BOS-“rural”) geographic level, and their aggregates. Semi-annually, a "current" sample is combined with the immediate five prior samples to produce a “combined” sample of approximately 1.2 million establishments (6 x 200,000) to produce OES Estimates.

== Process ==
During the sampling process, the National frame (using data collected by the Quarterly Census of Employment and Wages) of business establishments (approximately 7 million frame business establishments in-scope) is allocated for 1.2 million sample cases, then “divided” by 6 for each geography/industry cell (1.2 million/6=200,000).

After the sample of 200,000 is selected, data from each selected business establishment are collected by each state over the next nine months and reported back to BLS. These data include employment counts by occupation and wages paid by occupation. Wages are collected on an interval scale (rather than point data). Wages may be reported as an hourly wage or an annual wage. Wages include tips, but not overtime or any other bonus pay. Job benefits data are not collected.

After data are collected from the roughly 200,000 establishments, data are then combined with five prior collections' worth of data (for a total of 1.2 million) and weighted estimates are calculated. Most estimates are occupational-based (highly detailed using the 800 occupations in the Standard Occupational Classification System manual); estimates are calculated at the MSA-level with aggregate estimates at the state and national levels. A good example is that OES estimates calculate how many primary school teachers (including their wages) work in the Los Angeles-Long Beach-Glendale, CA MSA, which can be aggregated to how many primary school teachers (including their wages) work in California, which in turn can be aggregated to how many primary school teachers (including their wages) work in the United States.

The main occupational-based estimates that are calculated are:

- employment counts
- mean wages
- median wages
- percentile wages
- upper 2/3-lower 1/3 (experienced vs. entry-level) wages
- associated variances

Users of the OEWS data include colleges and trade school students, who use occupational information before entering the work force, temporary employment firms, and people who start businesses and want to know how much workers in various occupations are paid. BLS uses OEWS data to make occupational employment projections. OEWS data is used in the Foreign Labour Certification (FLC), program to evaluate employment opportunities and wages paid for documented foreign workers.

== See also ==
- JOLTS report
