= Current Employment Statistics =

The Current Employment Statistics (CES) survey, also known as the payroll or establishment survey, produces detailed industry estimates of nonfarm employment, hours, and earnings of workers on payrolls. CES National Estimates (CES-N) produces data for the nation, and CES State and Metro Area (CES-SA) produces estimates for all 50 States, the District of Columbia, Puerto Rico, the Virgin Islands, and about 450 metropolitan areas and divisions.

== Employment Situation jobs report ==
BLS has two monthly surveys that measure employment levels and trends: the CES survey, also known as the payroll or establishment survey, and the Current Population Survey (CPS), also known as the household survey. Both surveys are needed for a complete picture of the labor market, and the estimates differ because the surveys have distinct definitions of employment and distinct survey and estimation methods. National employment estimates from both the household and payroll surveys are published in the Employment Situation news release each month.

The payroll survey (CES) is designed to measure employment, hours, and earnings in the nonfarm sector, with industry and geographic detail. The survey is best known for providing a highly reliable gauge of monthly change in nonfarm payroll employment. A representative sample of businesses provides the data for the payroll survey.

The household survey (CPS) is designed to measure the labor force status of the civilian noninstitutional population with demographic detail. The national unemployment rate is the best-known statistic produced from the household survey. The survey also provides a measure of employed people, one that includes agricultural workers and the self-employed. A representative sample of households provides the information for the household survey.

== Methodology ==
Each month, CES surveys approximately 121,000 businesses and government agencies, representing approximately 631,000 individual worksites, drawn from a sampling frame of unemployment insurance tax accounts. Both programs use the same sample and collection methods. The businesses report data on employment, hours, and earnings for all paid workers from their payroll records. The data is collected for the pay period that includes the 12th of the month (regardless of its length), via a form sent to workplaces, by telephone, and online (but not by email, for security reasons).

For its monthly estimation, the CES-N program uses a matched sample concept and weighted sample data to produce employment, hours, and earnings estimates. Regarding its reliability, the CES survey, like other sample surveys, is subject to two types of error: sampling and nonsampling error. The magnitude of sampling error, or variance, is directly related to the size of the sample and the percentage of universe coverage achieved by the sample. The CES sample covers over one-third of total universe employment, yielding a very small variance for the total nonfarm estimates. Nonsampling error includes response errors, nonresponse bias, and frame imperfections, such as the inability to account for business births.

Participation in the survey is voluntary under federal law, but it is mandatory in California, New Mexico, Ohio, Oregon, South Carolina, and Puerto Rico. The South Carolina requirement applies to firms with more than 20 employees.

== History ==
Historically, the state role was much larger. State workforce agencies once handled sample selection, much of the collection, and production of their own state and metropolitan estimates. BLS progressively centralized those functions, and in March 2011 it took over production of the official state and metro estimates.
