= List of U.S. states and territories by unemployment rate =

The list of U.S. states and territories by unemployment rate compares the seasonally adjusted unemployment rates by state and territory, sortable by name, rate, and change. Data are provided by the Bureau of Labor Statistics in its Geographic Profile of Employment and Unemployment publication. While the non-seasonally adjusted data reflects the actual unemployment rate, the seasonally adjusted data removes time from the equation.

== Unemployment rate by jurisdiction ==
In August 2026, South Dakota had the lowest state unemployment rate at 2.0 percent, followed by North Dakota at 2.2 percent. The District of Columbia had the highest rate at 5.7 percent. Nineteen states had unemployment rates significantly lower than the national rate of 4.1 percent, while six states and the District had significantly higher rates.

The figures for the 50 states, the District of Columbia, and Puerto Rico are seasonally adjusted preliminary estimates for August 2026. The American Samoa and Northern Mariana Islands figures retained below have older reference periods. American Samoa is from 2018, and the Northern Mariana Islands figure is from April 2010.

Jurisdiction	Unemployment rate (%)	Reference period
Alabama	3.4	August 2026
Alaska	4.3	August 2026
Arizona	4.9	August 2026
Arkansas	3.9	August 2026
California	5.1	August 2026
Colorado	4.0	August 2026
Connecticut	5.1	August 2026
Delaware	4.7	August 2026
(Washington, D.C.) District of Columbia	5.7	August 2026
Florida	4.5	August 2026
Georgia	3.2	August 2026
Hawaii	2.7	August 2026
Idaho	3.6	August 2026
Illinois	4.7	August 2026
Indiana	3.3	August 2026
Iowa	3.2	August 2026
Kansas	3.8	August 2026
Kentucky	4.7	August 2026
Louisiana	4.2	August 2026
Maine	3.2	August 2026
Maryland	4.1	August 2026
Massachusetts	4.3	August 2026
Michigan	5.0	August 2026
Minnesota	4.4	August 2026
Mississippi	3.4	August 2026
Missouri	3.5	August 2026
Montana	3.2	August 2026
Nebraska	2.9	August 2026
Nevada	4.8	August 2026
New Hampshire	2.8	August 2026
New Jersey	4.3	August 2026
New Mexico	4.7	August 2026
New York	4.3	August 2026
North Carolina	3.5	August 2026
North Dakota	2.2	August 2026
Ohio	3.3	August 2026
Oklahoma	4.3	August 2026
Oregon	5.1	August 2026
Pennsylvania	3.7	August 2026
Rhode Island	3.7	August 2026
South Carolina	4.1	August 2026
South Dakota	2.0	August 2026
Tennessee	3.4	August 2026
Texas	4.4	August 2026
Utah	3.5	August 2026
Vermont	2.6	August 2026
Virginia	3.6	August 2026
Washington	4.9	August 2026
West Virginia	4.0	August 2026
Wisconsin	3.2	August 2026
Wyoming	3.0	August 2026
Northern Mariana Islands	11.2	April 2010
American Samoa	11.4	2018
Puerto Rico	6.1	August 2026

Note that italics represent an insular possession of the United States.

== See also ==
- List of U.S. States by employment rate
- Job creation index
- Unemployment in the United States
