= Royal Meeker =

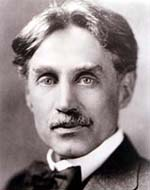

Commissioner of the U.S. Bureau of Labor Statistics
- In office August 11, 1913 – June 1920
- President: Woodrow Wilson
- Preceded by: George Wallace William Hanger
- Succeeded by: Ethelbert Stewart

Personal details
- Born: February 23, 1873
- Died: August 16, 1953 (aged 80) New Haven, Connecticut
- Party: Democratic Party
- Education: Iowa State College; Columbia University

Royal Meeker (February 23, 1873 – August 16, 1953) was a progressive American economist, born at Quaker Lake, Susquehanna County, Pennsylvania. He graduated from Iowa State College in 1898, then studied with E.R.A. Seligman at Columbia (Ph.D., 1906) and for a year at the University of Leipzig (1903–1904). His dissertation was entitled History of Shipping Subsidies (1905).

From 1906 to 1913, Meeker was a professor of history, economics, and political science at Ursinus College, Collegeville, Pennsylvania and a preceptor and professor of economics at Princeton. He knew Woodrow Wilson, then the president of Princeton, and they served together on New Jersey political boards. Both were associated with the Progressive movement for an active role for government.

President Wilson appointed Meeker Commissioner of Labor Statistics in 1913. As the commissioner of the Bureau of Labor Statistics, Meeker managed special economic studies during World War I and began its regular publication, the Monthly Labor Review, in 1915. In 1916 he was elected as a Fellow of the American Statistical Association. In 1919-1920 he served as a member of the Federal Electric Railways Commission.

Meeker advocated a number of progressive reforms including a minimum wage, national health insurance, child labor restrictions combined with strong, State-controlled schools, workmen's compensation, and a nationwide system of public employment offices.

During the Wilson presidency, Meeker wrote a letter to Woodrow Wilson dated March the 3rd 1916 in which he expressed to Wilson the need for there to be a campaign for safeguarding American workmen and a big extension of social insurance, such as through a national health insurance act and a model compensation law covering all employees of the District of Columbia and of the United States government. Meeker also noted in his letter how the United States lagged behind several European countries in respect of social insurance, stating

I am, as you know, greatly interested in what has come to be called social insurance. I feel that the compensation legislation in the United States is needlessly backward and that it is necessary for us to forge ahead in this line of social legislation in order to give to the workers of the United States the protection they have a right to expect from the State. European countries are far in advance of us in respect to social insurance, and this is one of the reasons that their people are more united than our people.

Meeker concluded by expressing his wish to have a meeting with Wilson to discuss these matters with him, believing that he could submit to Wilson (as he put it) “facts and opinions which will be of interest and value to you.” However, no record exists of Wilson and Meeker having a meeting to discuss this subject.

Meeker resigned as Commissioner of Labor Statistics in 1920 to take up the opportunity to help organize the new International Labour Organization, where he was the Chief of the Scientific Division from 1920 to 1923. He alsoserved as Pennsylvania Secretary of Labor and Industry from 1923 to 1924, and later joined the faculty of Carleton College (1926–1927) and Yale University (1930–1936, perhaps longer). He was Director of Research of the Connecticut Department of Labor (1941–1946). He died in New Haven, Connecticut in 1953.

== Bibliography ==
- Royal Meeker (1905). History of Shipping Subsidies. Columbia University.
- Marie Louise Obenauer; Royal Meeker; Frances Wadsworth Valentine (1914). Hours, Earnings, and Conditions of Labor of Women in Indiana Mercantile Establishments and Garment Factories. U.S. Government Printing Office.
- "Royal Meeker". JSTOR.
