= Brett Matsumoto =

American economist (born 1984)

- Commissioner Brett Matsumoto, 2026

17th Commissioner of Labor Statistics
- Incumbent
- Assumed office August 11, 2026
- President: Donald Trump
- Preceded by: Erika McEntarfer

Personal details
- Education: University of Delaware (BA, BS, MA); University of North Carolina at Chapel Hill (PhD)

Brett Matsumoto is an American economist who is serving Commissioner of Bureau of Labor Statistics.

== Early life and education ==
Brett Matsumoto graduated from Newark High School in 2002. He then attended the University of Delaware earning a Bachelor of Arts in philosophy and history and both a bachelor's and master's degree in economics. In 2015 he completed his Ph.D in economics from the University of North Carolina at Chapel Hill. His research focused on economic measurement.

== Career ==
Matsumoto began working for the Bureau of Labor Statistics's Division of Price and Index Number Research in 2015. His work at the bureau focused on inflation calculations. Matsumoto co-authored a section in the bureau's handbook on techniques to measure inflation and advocated for changes to how the bureau calculates costs to health insurance. He joined the Council of Economic Advisers on assignment in the first and second Trump administrations.

== Commissioner of Labor Statistics ==
On January 30, 2026, The Wall Street Journal reported that president Donald Trump had named Matsumoto as his nominee for commissioner of labor statistics, succeeding the economist Erika McEntarfer, whom he fired in August 2025. Trump publicly announced that Matsumoto would be his nominee hours later. Matsumoto's nomination was officially submitted to the Senate on May 11. He appeared before the Senate Health, Education, Labor, and Pensions Committee on June 10, where he stated his intention to improve data quality and reliability.
