= David L. Wickens =

American economist and politician

David Lawrence Wickens (November 12, 1890 – April 12, 1970) was an American farmer, economist and politician.

Born in Lincoln, Nebraska, Wickens went to public schools in Bon Homme County, South Dakota, and lived on a farm near Avon, South Dakota. Wickens served in the United States Army during World War I and World War II. He received his bachelor's degree from Morningside College in 1913 and his master's and doctorate degrees from University of Chicago.

Wickens was an economist for the United States Department of Agriculture. Wickens helped start the Farmers Co-op Elevator in Avon, South Dakota. In 1953 and 1954, Wickens served in the South Dakota State Senate and was a Republican. Wickens taught economics at Morningside College and American University.

Wickens died at his home in Vienna, Virginia, and was buried in Arlington National Cemetery.

His wife was Aryness Joy Wickens, who was also an economist, and he had a son, Donaldson of Avon.
