= Aryness Joy Wickens =

American economist and statistician

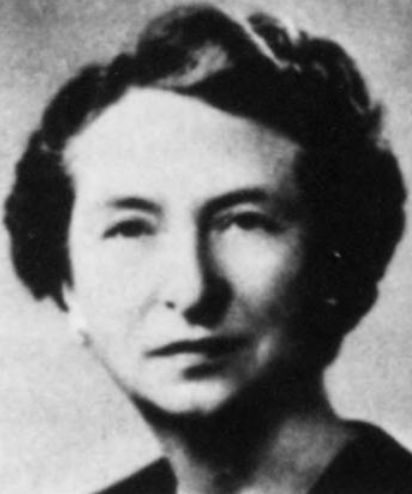
- Aryness Joy Wickens, from a 1961 publication of the United States federal government

Acting Commissioner of Labor Statistics
- In office July 1946 – August 1946
- President: Harry S. Truman
- Preceded by: A. Ford Hinrichs
- Succeeded by: Ewan Clague

Personal details
- Born: January 5, 1901 Bellingham, Washington, US
- Died: February 2, 1991 (aged 90) Jackson, Mississippi, US
- Education: University of Washington; University of Chicago

Aryness Joy Wickens (January 5, 1901 – February 2, 1991) was an American economist and statistician who served as acting commissioner of the US Bureau of Labor Statistics and as president of the American Statistical Association, and who helped develop the United States Consumer Price Index.

== Education and career ==
Aryness Joy was born in Bellingham, Washington. She did her undergraduate studies at the University of Washington, graduating Phi Beta Kappa, and earned a master's degree in economics from the University of Chicago. At the University of Washington, she became a member of Kappa Kappa Gamma.

After teaching economics at Mount Holyoke College from 1924 to 1928, she moved to Washington, DC to work for the Federal Reserve Board. There, her work included the measurement of industrial production. She also worked for a precursor of the Office of Management and Budget in the early 1930s.

Wickens joined the Bureau of Labor Statistics in 1933, at first serving on an advisory committee of the American Statistical Association to the program, and then working as an assistant to the commissioner of the bureau. Her work at that time involved the investigation of monopolistic business practices. She was promoted to branch chief at the BLS in 1940, heading a group that studied prices and the cost of living. Later Wickens became assistant and deputy commissioner of the bureau. During this time she also represented the US as an adviser at the United Nations and international conferences. In 1961 she became economic adviser to the Secretary of Labor. She retired in the early 1970s, but returned to duty at the Commission on Federal Paperwork as director of statistical studies there.

At the Bureau of Labor Statistics, Joy served as acting commissioner in 1946, and again in 1954–1955. In her second term as acting commissioner, her $13,500 salary made her the highest-paid female federal civil servant.

== Other activities ==
In 1935, Wickens was considered as one of several candidates to be the president of Mount Holyoke, continuing a tradition of female leadership at that school. However, instead, controversially, the trustees selected Roswell G. Ham to be president.

In 1952 she became the president of the American Statistical Association.

== Awards and recognition ==
Wickens was elected as a Fellow of the American Statistical Association in 1937, the second woman (after Kate Claghorn) to be so honored.

In 1960 Wickens was one of the inaugural recipients of the US Civil Service Commission's Federal Women's Award.

== Personal life ==
Joy married David L. Wickens, an economist, United States Air Force lieutenant colonel, rancher, and member of the South Dakota Senate, on June 29, 1935. Her husband died in 1970. After retiring, she moved to Mississippi in 1986.
