= Arthur Ross (baseball) =

American baseball player

- Pitcher
- Born: August 27, 1878; Louisville, Kentucky, U.S.
- Died: July 25, 1916 (aged 37); Chicago, Illinois, U.S.
- Threw: Left

Negro league baseball debut
- 1903, for the Leland Giants

Last appearance
- 1904, for the Leland Giants

Teams
- Leland Giants (1903–1904)

Arthur C. Ross (August 27, 1878 – July 25, 1916) was an American Negro league pitcher in the 1900s.

A native of Louisville, Kentucky, Ross played for the Leland Giants in 1903 and 1904. He died in Chicago, Illinois in 1916 at age 37.
