= Monthly Labor Review =

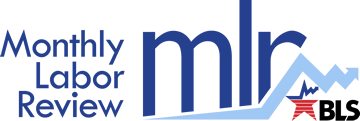
- Discipline: Economics, statistics
- Language: English

Publication details
- Former name: Monthly Review
- History: 1915–present
- Publisher: Bureau of Labor Statistics (United States)
- Frequency: Monthly
- Open access: yes

Standard abbreviations
- Bluebook: Monthly Lab. Rev.
- ISO 4: Mon. Labor Rev.

Indexing
- ISSN: 0098-1818
- JSTOR: 00981818
- OCLC no.: 958653658

Links
- Journal homepage; Online archive

The Monthly Labor Review (MLR) is published by the U.S. Bureau of Labor Statistics (BLS). Issues often focus on a particular topic. Most articles are by BLS staff.

Annually since 1969, the Lawrence R. Klein Award has been awarded to authors of articles appearing in the Monthly Labor Review, generally one to BLS authors and one to non-BLS authors.

== History ==
In 1915, under commissioner Royal Meeker, BLS began publishing the Monthly Review, with a circulation of 8,000. The name became Monthly Labor Review in 1918, and circulation rose to 20,000 in June 1920. The journal has published its articles on the web for a decade. In 2008 the journal ceased to publish a bound paper edition, and now publishes only online.
