= Arthur Ross (commissioner) =

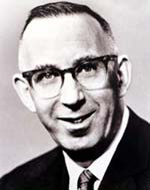

Commissioner of the U.S. Bureau of Labor Statistics
- In office October 1965 – July 1968
- President: Lyndon B. Johnson
- Preceded by: Ewan Clague
- Succeeded by: Ben Burdetsky; Acting

Personal details
- Born: May 1, 1916 Rochester, New York
- Died: June 5, 1970 Allen Park, Michigan

Arthur Ross (1916–1970) was the commissioner of the U.S. Bureau of Labor Statistics (BLS) from 1965 to 1968.

Later, he became a vice president at the University of Michigan.

== Education ==
Ross graduated from the Harvard College and earned a doctorate from the University of California at Berkeley.
