= Bureau of Labor Statistics =

US government agency

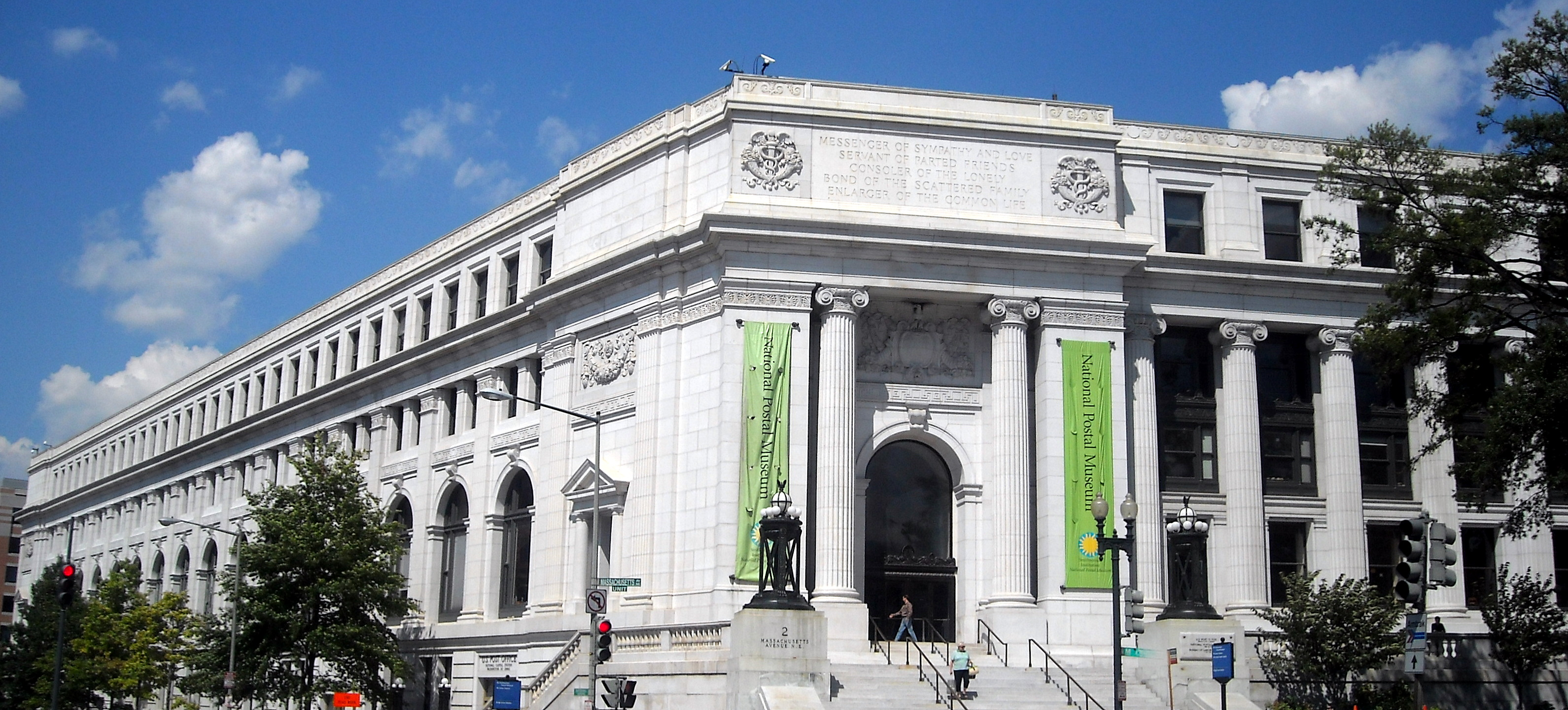
- The Postal Square Building in Washington, D.C., headquarters of the Bureau of Labor Statistics until 2024

Agency overview
- Formed: June 27, 1884; 142 years ago
- Jurisdiction: Federal government of the United States
- Headquarters: Suitland Federal Center Suitland, Maryland, U.S.
- Employees: 2,100
- Annual budget: $697.9 million (FY2025 enacted)
- Agency executives: Brett Matsumoto, Commissioner; William J. Wiatrowski, Deputy Commissioner
- Website: bls.gov

The Bureau of Labor Statistics (BLS) is a unit of the United States Department of Labor. It is the principal fact-finding agency for the U.S. government in the broad field of labor economics and statistics and serves as a principal agency of the U.S. federal statistical system. The BLS collects, processes, analyzes, and disseminates essential statistical data to the American public, the U.S. Congress, other Federal agencies, state and local governments, businesses, and labor representatives. The BLS also serves as a statistical resource to the United States Department of Labor, and conducts research measuring the income levels families need to maintain a satisfactory quality of life.

BLS data must satisfy a number of criteria, including relevance to current social and economic issues, timeliness in reflecting today's rapidly changing economic conditions, accuracy and consistently high statistical quality, impartiality in both subject matter and presentation, and accessibility to all. To avoid the appearance of partiality, the dates of major data releases are scheduled more than a year in advance, in coordination with the Office of Management and Budget.

== History ==
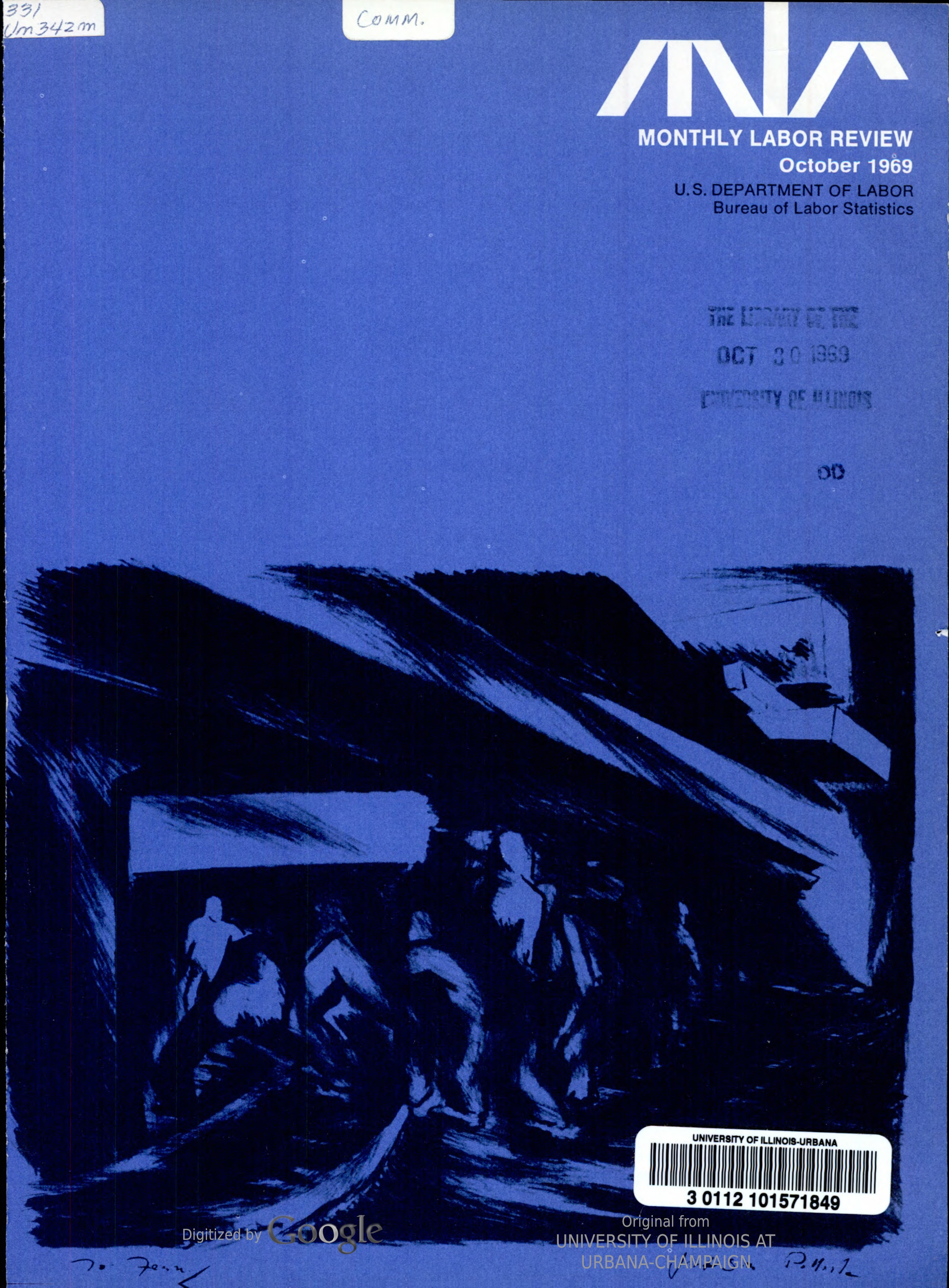
Front page of the Monthly Labor Review, October 1969

The Bureau of Labor was established within the Department of the Interior on June 27, 1884, to collect information about employment and labor. Its creation under the Bureau of Labor Act (23 Stat. 60) stemmed from the findings of U.S. Senator Henry W. Blair's "Labor and Capital Hearings", which examined labor issues and working conditions in the U.S. Statistician Carroll D. Wright became the first U.S. Commissioner of Labor in 1885, a position he held until 1905. The Bureau's placement within the federal government structure changed three times in the first 29 years following its formation. It was made an independent (sub-Cabinet) department by the Department of Labor Act (25 Stat. 182) on June 13, 1888. The Bureau was then incorporated into the Department of Commerce and Labor by the Department of Commerce Act (32 Stat. 827) on February 14, 1903. Finally, it was transferred under the Department of Labor in 1913, where it resides today. Starting in 1992, BLS was headquartered in the Postal Square Building near Washington Union Station. During 2024, BLS headquarters were moved to the Suitland Federal Center in Suitland, Maryland, into the same facility that houses the Bureau of the Census headquarters.

Since 1915, the BLS has published the Monthly Labor Review, a journal focused on the data and methodologies of labor statistics.

The BLS is headed by a commissioner who serves a four-year term of office.

Erica Groshen was confirmed by the U.S. Senate on January 2, 2013, and sworn in as the 14th commissioner of labor statistics on January 29, 2013, for a term that ended on January 27, 2017. William Wiatrowski, Deputy Commissioner of the BLS, served as Acting Commissioner until the next commissioner, William Beach was sworn in. Beach served until January 2024, at which time he was succeeded by Erika McEntarfer.

=== Firing of Commissioner McEntarfer ===
Trump fired BLS director Erika McEntarfer soon after a downward revision to the July 2025 employment statistic, but subsequent months showed no net improvement over July's number. In December 2025, Trump rated his economy as "A+++++".

On August 1, 2025, President Donald Trump announced that he would fire Commissioner McEntarfer, hours after a downward revision in job creation was published in the Bureau's July jobs report. According to the BBC, "[t]he decision shocked Wall Street and raised alarm about White House interference in economic data." Commentators pointed out that due to BLS security precautions, the commissioner did not have access to the systems that collect the data for this report, and could not change the results without a large number of people knowing and at least some of them complaining publicly.

The White House nominated Brett Matsumoto to be the new Commissioner, filing for Senate confirmation on May 11, 2026.

== US Jobs Report ==
Every month, usually on the first Friday, the BLS releases its Employment Situation Summary, commonly known as the "US jobs report," among other monthly, quarterly, annual, etc., reports.

The methods the BLS uses for the surveys that originate the data for the jobs reports, and how the calculations for the reports are done, are publicly available government data, published on the BLS website.

The BLS collects job data in two separate surveys: the Current Population Survey (CPS) and Current Employment Statistics (CES).

=== Current Population Survey (CPS) ===
This survey provides data on the employed, unemployed, and those not in the labor force. It measures the unemployment rate, labor force participation rate, and employment-to-population ratio. It is a monthly survey of U.S. households, conducted by the United States Census Bureau for the BLS. Participation in the survey is voluntary.

After the interviews are conducted, the Census Bureau processes the raw data files (as submitted by interviewers) to create a microdata file that can be used to produce estimates. This processing includes removing all personally identifiable information, assigning standardized occupation and industry classifications, editing the data for completeness and consistency, and creating new data elements based on responses to multiple survey questions. Data from field interviewers and centralized call centers are transmitted to Census Bureau headquarters daily during the survey interview period through secure electronic communications. When the Census Bureau's processing activities are completed, the microdata file is securely transferred to the BLS for estimation of labor force statistics.

=== Current Employment Statistics (CES) ===
This program produces detailed industry estimates of nonfarm employment, hours, and earnings of workers on payrolls. CES National Estimates (CES-N) produces data for the nation, and CES State and Metro Area (CES-SA) produces estimates for all 50 States, the District of Columbia, Puerto Rico, the Virgin Islands, and about 450 metropolitan areas and divisions.

Both surveys are needed for a complete picture of the labor market, and the estimates differ because the surveys have distinct definitions of employment and distinct survey and estimation methods.

=== Revisions ===
From 2000 through 2024, the average magnitude (absolute value) of the BLS's final revision of non-farm employment was about 265,000 annually. The average change between preliminary revisions and final revisions has been about 58,000 annually. (Distinguish: most news stories report figures monthly.)

The BLS cautions on its releases page that "data in archived news releases may have been revised in subsequent releases. The latest data, including any revisions, may be obtained from the databases accessible on the program homepages."

In addition to the last month's information, the jobs report revises up or down the previous two months' jobs totals. The primary reasons for the monthly revisions are the collection of additional samples and seasonal adjustments. Also, each year, CES March employment data are reanchored or benchmarked to employment population totals primarily derived from the Quarterly Census of Employment and Wages. This is done by replacing the March data-based employment estimates with universe counts of employment. The data are also re-seasonally adjusted to account for the benchmark revision and the re-evaluation of outliers and models. "Although revisions can seem disruptive to some users, they are an integral part of the quality control of CES sample-based estimates." The BLS does not wait until it has all the reports to make the estimate and avoid revisions because users of the data are "intensely interested in the earliest possible read on labor market developments." As the revised estimates are based on more complete data, they create a higher resolution picture; sometimes, the revised data produce a totally different picture.

Following Trump's firing of Commissioner McEntarfer, the media explained how The Employment Situation reports are made, stating that revisions are not unusual, nor are large changes in them abnormal. The BLS considers its initial job numbers as preliminary when they are first published, because some businesses do not report their payroll data by the deadline (only about 60% do), making the report harder to estimate. The BLS continues collecting the payroll data (three months after the deadline, when more than 90% of workplaces have responded), and revising it according to seasonal adjustments; if more complete data is much above or below the preliminary data, "revisions can be exacerbated by the BLS' seasonal adjustments, which sometimes need to be recalculated." The data is revised in each of the two months following the initial report, also in a preliminary annual revision (August), and in a final annual revision (February), adding unemployment insurance data; there is a 10-year revision with census data. The BLS does not provide lengthy analyses of the revisions; according to William Beach, "it's normal for BLS not to explain those differences, because then they're doing a job outside of the job they're supposed to do, which is to take the data, and statistically make modifications to the estimates based on the data."

According to the WSJ, the BLS has faced issues with data collection in recent years. Budget cuts—including a governmental hiring freeze earlier this year—and response rates have made providing real-time, accurate data more difficult. For example, the BLS surveys about 120,000 employers by phone or online to track the number of jobs in the economy and about 30% to 40% do not reply on time—up from under 20% a decade ago.

According to Barry Knapp of Ironsides Macroeconomics, the model used by BLS systematically overestimates the employment effects of small businesses. At the same time, reduced numbers of job-seeking foreigners are not caused by higher employment but by increased deportations and sinking immigration, which is not reflected in the BLS reports.

== Commissioners ==
Commissioners of Labor Statistics (1885 to present):

No.	Portrait	Commissioner	Took office	Left office	Refs.
1		Carroll D. Wright	January 1885	January 1905	
2		Charles P. Neill	February 1905	May 1913	
Acting		George Hanger	May 1913	August 1913	
3		Royal Meeker	August 11, 1913	June 1920	
4		Ethelbert Stewart	June 1920	June 1932	
Acting		Charles E. Baldwin	July 1932	July 1933	
5		Isador Lubin	July 1933	January 1946	
Acting		A. Ford Hinrichs	January 1946	July 1946	
Acting		Aryness Joy Wickens	July 1946	August 1946	
6		Ewan Clague	August 1946	September 1965	
7		Arthur Ross	October 1965	July 1968	
Acting		Ben Burdetsky	July 1968	March 1969	
8		Geoffrey H. Moore	March 1969	January 1973	
Acting		Ben Burdetsky	January 1973	July 1973	
9		Julius Shiskin (Note: Died in office)	July 1973	October 1978	
10		Janet L. Norwood	May 1979	December 1991	
Acting		William G. Barron Jr.	December 1991	October 1993	
11		Katharine Abraham	October 1993	October 2001	
Acting		Lois Orr	October 2001	July 2002	
12		Kathleen Utgoff	July 2002	July 2006	
Acting		Philip Rones	July 2006	January 2008	
13		Keith Hall	January 2008	January 2012	
Acting		John M. (Jack) Galvin	January 2012	January 2013	
14		Erica Groshen	January 29, 2013	January 27, 2017	
Acting		William J. Wiatrowski (Note: Deputy Commissioner serving as acting commissioner)	January 28, 2017	March 27, 2019	
15		William Beach	March 28, 2019	March 27, 2023	
Acting		William J. Wiatrowski	March 28, 2023	January 28, 2024	
16		Erika McEntarfer	January 29, 2024	August 1, 2025	
Acting		William J. Wiatrowski	August 1, 2025	August 11, 2026	
17		Brett Matsumoto	August 11, 2026	Present	

Table notes:

== Statistical reporting ==
Statistics published by the BLS fall into four main categories:

=== Prices ===
- U.S. Consumer Price Index
- Producer Price Index
- U.S. Import and Export Price Indexes
- Consumer Expenditure Survey

=== Employment and unemployment ===
Unemployment measurements by the BLS from 1950 to 2010

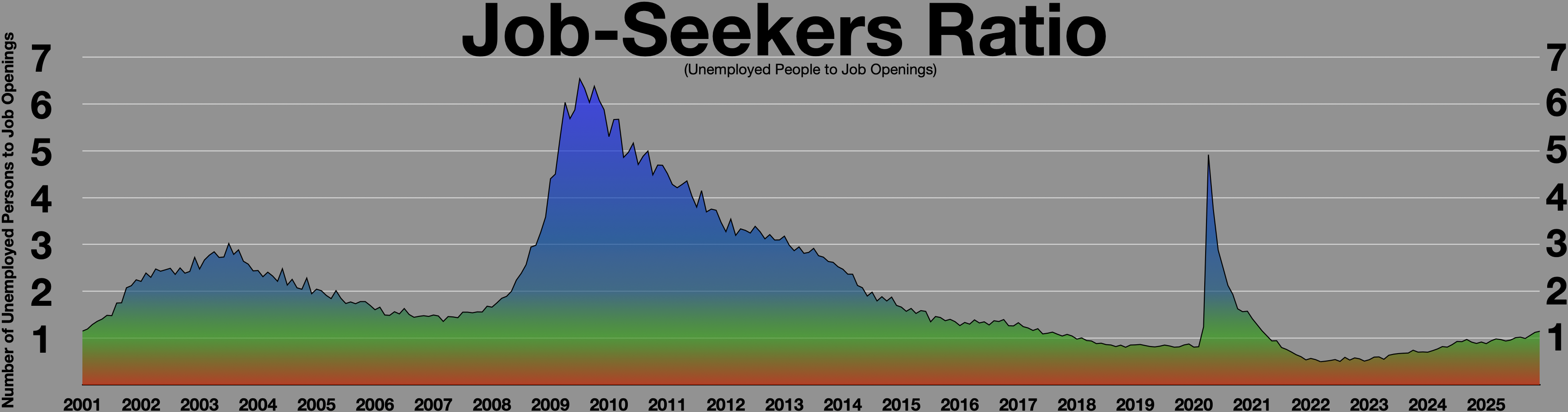
Job seekers ratio in the JOLTS report Cold job market Balanced job market Hot job market

- Current Population Survey (The "Household Survey")
  - The American Time Use Survey
- Current Employment Statistics (The "Establishment Survey")
  - Payroll Employment
  - JOLTS report - Job Openings and Labor Turnover Survey
  - Economic geography
  - Salary Data
- Local Area Unemployment Statistics (LAUS)
  - List of U.S. states by unemployment rate
- Current Employment Statistics State and Area program
- The Job Openings and Labor Turnover Survey (JOLTS)
- The Quarterly Census of Employment and Wages (QCEW)
- The Business Employment Dynamics (BED) program
- Not in labor force (NILF)
- Ten year occupational employment projections
- Occupational Employment and Wage Statistics, called OES until recently
- Mass Layoff Statistics--discontinued in 2013

=== Compensation and working conditions ===
- National Compensation Survey
  - Employment Cost Index
- Workplace Injury and Fatality Statistics
  Workers involved in strikes by year, US Bureau of Labor Statistics
- Occupational Requirements Survey

=== Productivity ===
- Labor productivity, aggregate and by industry
- Multifactor productivity
- State labor productivity
- Work Stoppage data

== Statistical regions ==
Data produced by the BLS is often categorized into groups of states known as Census Regions. There are four Census Regions, which are further categorized by Census Division as follows:

Northeast Region

- New England Division: Connecticut, Maine, Massachusetts, New Hampshire, Rhode Island, and Vermont.
- Middle Atlantic Division: New Jersey, New York, and Pennsylvania.

South Region

- South Atlantic Division: Delaware, District of Columbia, Florida, Georgia, Maryland, North Carolina, South Carolina, Virginia, and West Virginia.
- East South Central Division: Alabama, Kentucky, Mississippi, and Tennessee.
- West South Central Division: Arkansas, Louisiana, Oklahoma, and Texas.

Midwest Region

- East North Central Division: Illinois, Indiana, Michigan, Ohio, and Wisconsin.
- West North Central Division: Iowa, Kansas, Minnesota, Missouri, Nebraska, North Dakota, and South Dakota.

West Region

- Mountain Division: Arizona, Colorado, Idaho, Montana, Nevada, New Mexico, Utah, and Wyoming.
- Pacific Division: Alaska, California, Hawaii, Oregon, and Washington.

== See also ==
- Alternative employment arrangements
- Bureau of Economic Analysis
- Career Guide to Industries
- Data.gov
- Economic reports
- Index of Leading Indicators
- Job Creation Index
- Monthly Labor Review
- National Income and Product Accounts
- Occupational Outlook Handbook
- U.S. Census Bureau
- USAFacts
