= Quarterly Census of Employment and Wages =

Census of Employment and Wages

The Quarterly Census of Employment and Wages (QCEW, aka ES-202) is a program of the Bureau of Labor Statistics in the US Department of Labor that produces a comprehensive tabulation of employment and wage information for workers covered by state unemployment insurance (UI) laws, as reported to state workforce agencies (SWAs) and the Unemployment Compensation for Federal Employees (UCFE) program for covered federal workers. ES-202 is the old name and stood for Employment Security Report 202.

Unemployment Insurance tax reports provide the data for federal QCEW data, which is considered a statistical universe file of the employment data collected for the nation, but gig workers (e.g. in the platform economy) are typically classified as independent contractors and therefore not included in those or other federal data.
