= JOLTS report =

Unemployment report

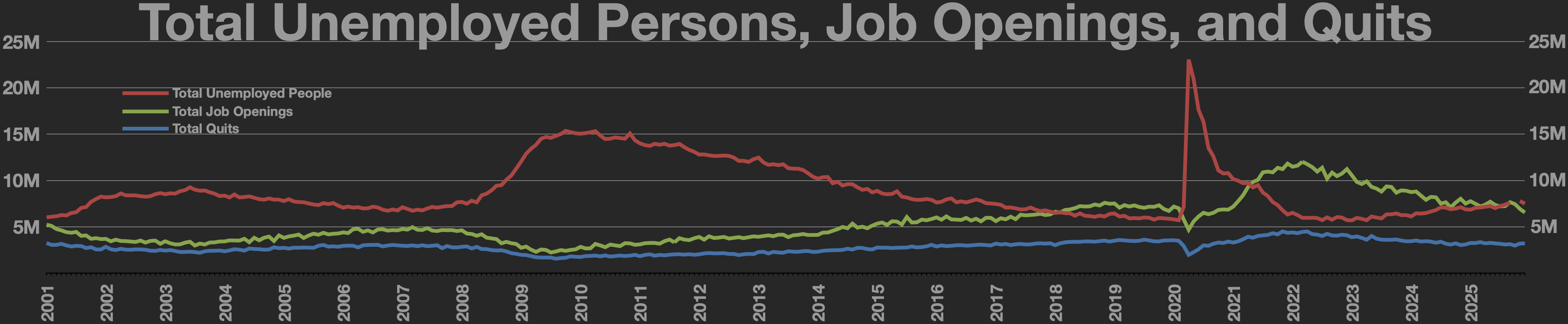
Total unemployed people Total job openings Total quits

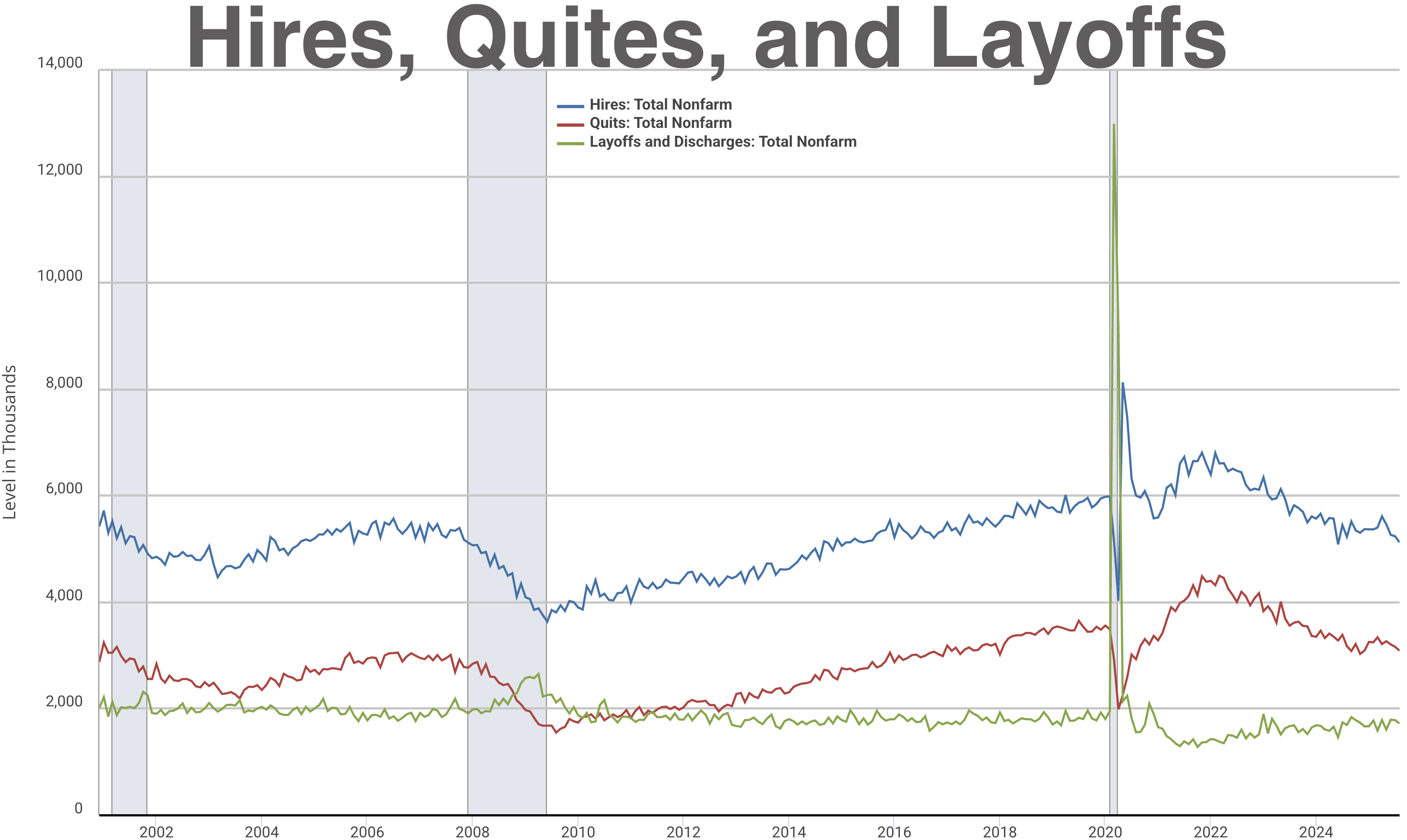
Total hires Total quits Total layoffs

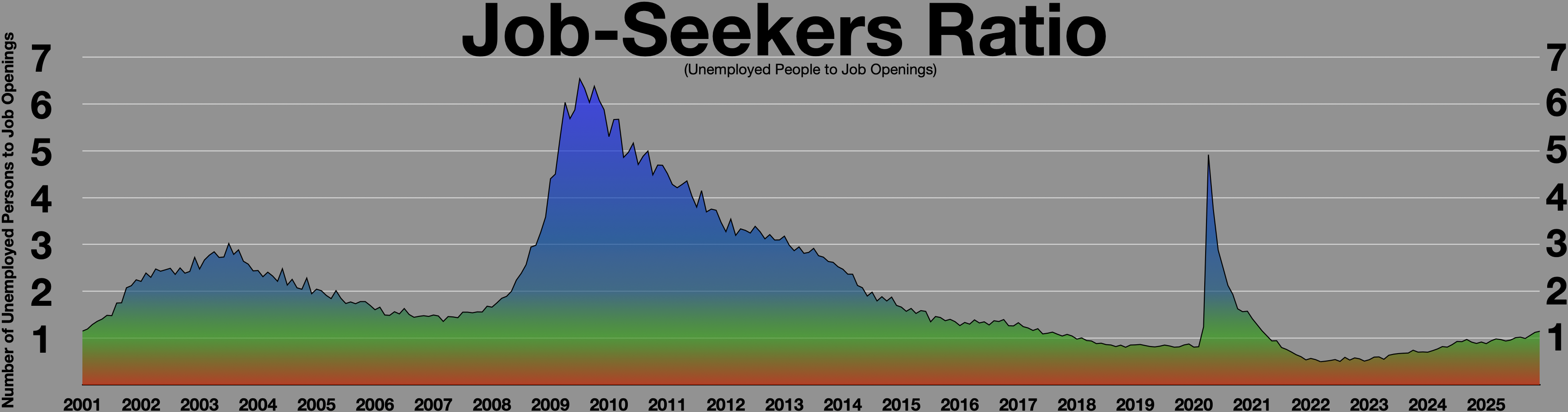
Job seekers ratio Cold job market Balanced job market Hot job market

The Job Openings and Labor Turnover Survey (JOLTS) is a monthly survey conducted by the Bureau of Labor Statistics. It measures job openings, hires, and separations, including quits, layoffs, discharges, and other separations. The survey covers nonfarm establishments in the private sector and federal, state, and local government. Its estimates are used to assess labor demand and worker turnover alongside employment and unemployment statistics. Job openings and the quits rate reached record highs in 2021 and 2022 during the Great Resignation.

== See also ==
- Frisch elasticity of labor supply
- Ghost job
- Inverted yield curve
- Nonfarm payrolls
- Occupational Employment and Wage Statistics
- Sahm rule - economic indicator predicting recessions
- Youth unemployment
