= Skilled through alternative routes =

Adults without bachelor's degrees who have experience that position them to higher-wages

Skilled through alternative routes (STAR) is a term to describe adults in the United States without bachelor's degrees who have work experience and skills that position them for transitions to higher-wage jobs. First defined in a 2020 research paper by Peter Q. Blair in the National Bureau of Economic Research (NBER), STARs made up approximately 70 million workers in the U.S. economy as of 2021.

== Description ==
The majority of American workers (approximately 64% as of 2020) do not have a four-year bachelor's degree, including 68 percent of Black workers and 79 percent of Hispanic workers.

STARs have gained skills through a variety of routes other than the four-year college degree, often including community college, workforce training, bootcamps, certificate programs, military service or on-the-job learning. Research from December 2020 indicates that 30 million STARs have the skills to earn 70 percent more than their current wages. However, 60 percent of STARs who changed jobs over the past decade transitioned to new positions with the same or lower wages than their previous position.

Proponents of supporting STARs argue that a more intentional approach to hiring, training, and recruiting STARs can help to increase the representation of non-white individuals in the workforce.
