= List of fellows of the American Statistical Association =

Like many other academic professional societies, the American Statistical Association (ASA) uses the title of Fellow of the American Statistical Association as its highest honorary grade of membership. The designation of ASA Fellow has been a significant honor for more than 100 years. The number of new fellows per year is limited to one third of one percent of the membership of the ASA. To be selected, nominees must have an established reputation and have made outstanding contributions to statistical science. People named as Fellows are listed below.

== Fellows ==
=== 1914 ===
- John Lee Coulter
- Miles Menander Dawson
- Frank H. Dixon
- David Parks Fackler
- Henry Walcott Farnam
- Charles Ferris Gettemy
- Franklin Henry Giddings
- Henry J. Harris
- Edward M. Hartwell
- Joseph A. Hill
- George K. Holmes
- William Chamberlin Hunt
- John Koren
- Thomas Bassett Macaulay
- S. N. D. North
- Warren M. Persons
- Edward B. Phelps
- LeGrand Powers
- William Sidney Rossiter
- Charles H. Verrill
- Cressy L. Wilbur
- S. Herbert Wolfe
- Allyn Abbott Young

=== 1916 ===
- Victor S. Clark
- Frederick Stephen Crum
- Louis Israel Dublin
- Walter Sherman Gifford
- James Waterman Glover
- Royal Meeker
- Wesley Clair Mitchell
- Charles P. Neill
- Julius Hall Parmelee
- George E. Roberts
- I. M. Rubinow

=== 1917 ===
- Leonard Porter Ayres
- Robert E. Chaddock
- Willford I. King
- Max O. Lorenz
- Henry Ludwell Moore
- Albert Henry Mowbray
- Nahum I. Stone
- Frank H. Streightoff
- Edward Thorndike

=== 1918 ===
- Kate Claghorn
- John Cummings
- William A. Hathaway
- Horace Secrist

=== 1920 ===
- F. Stuart Chapin
- Roland P. Falkner
- Abb Landis
- William Fielding Ogburn
- Raymond Pearl
- Ethelbert Stewart

=== 1921 ===
- Charles J. Bullock
- Melvin T. Copeland
- Charles Davenport
- Edmund Ezra Day
- Edwin Francis Gay
- Emanuel Goldenweiser
- John H. Gray
- Lewis Henry Haney
- Louis N. Robinson
- Elihu Root
- Malcolm C. Rorty

=== 1922 ===
- Willard C. Brinton
- Robert H. Coates
- James H. Field
- Arne Fisher
- David Friday
- James Arthur Harris
- F. Leslie Hayford
- Don D. Lescohier
- Roswell F. Phelps
- Joseph E. Pogue
- Horatio Pollock
- Harold Rugg
- Edgar Sydenstricker
- Fred G. Tryon
- George P. Watkins
- Leo Wolman

=== 1923 ===
- W. Leonard Crum
- Truman Lee Kelley
- Frederick Macaulay
- Henry Lewis Rietz
- Carl Snyder

=== 1924 ===
- Joseph S. Davis
- Edwin Bidwell Wilson

=== 1926 ===
- Alfred J. Lotka
- Frederick C. Mills

=== 1927 ===
- Seymour L. Andrew
- Lowell Reed
- Walter W. Stewart

=== 1928 ===
- John Rice Miner
- Frank A. Ross

=== 1930 ===
- Warren Randolph Burgess
- Harry C. Carver

=== 1931 ===
- Mordecai Ezekiel
- Ralph G. Hurlin
- George F. Warren

=== 1932 ===
- Alvin Hansen

=== 1933 ===
- Stuart A. Rice
- Henry Schultz

=== 1934 ===
- William A. Berridge
- Walter A. Shewhart

=== 1935 ===
- Donald R. Belcher
- Winfield W. Riefler
- Woodlief Thomas

=== 1936 ===
- Burton Howard Camp
- Morris Copeland
- Paul R. Rider

=== 1937 ===
- Robert W. Burgess
- Harold Hotelling
- Aryness Joy Wickens
- Simon Kuznets
- O. C. Stine
- Leon E. Truesdell

=== 1939 ===
- Theodore H. Brown
- Arthur R. Crathorne
- Halbert L. Dunn
- Meredith B. Givens
- Charles F. Roos
- George W. Snedecor
- Frederick F. Stephan
- Willard Thorp
- Ralph J. Watkins
- Joseph H. Willits

=== 1940 ===
- Joseph Berkson
- Samuel A. Stouffer
- Helen M. Walker
- Samuel S. Wilks
- Theodore O. Yntema

=== 1941 ===
- J. Frederic Dewhurst
- George O. May
- Vergil D. Reed
- Bradford B. Smith
- Howard R. Tolley
- Pascal K. Whelpton

=== 1942 ===
- Chester Ittner Bliss
- W. Edwards Deming
- Edward L. Dodd
- Edward Vermilye Huntington
- Robert R. Nathan
- Jerzy Neyman
- Frank W. Notestein
- John W. Scoville
- Dorothy Swaine Thomas
- Rufus W. Tucker

=== 1943 ===
- Thomas C. Atkeson
- Merrill K. Bennett
- Arthur F. Burns
- Cecil C. Craig
- Churchill Eisenhart
- George B. Roberts
- Richard E. Scammon
- Arthur R. Tebbutt
- George Terborgh
- Holbrook Working

=== 1944 ===
- Henry B. Arthur
- A. E. Brandt
- William Gemmell Cochran
- Gertrude Mary Cox
- Philip Hauser
- Frank Lorimer
- Isador Lubin
- Charles F. Sarle
- Alan E. Treloar
- Sewall Wright

=== 1945 ===
- Edith Abbott
- A. Ford Hinrichs
- Lester S. Kellogg
- William R. Leonard
- Edward C. Molina
- Hugo Muench
- E. Grosvenor Plowman
- Leslie Earl Simon
- Mary van Kleeck
- Abraham Wald
- Frederick V. Waugh

=== 1946 ===
- Calvert L. Dedrick
- Stephen M. Dubrul
- Meyer A. Girshick
- Irving Lorge
- William G. Madow
- Howard B. Myers
- Gladys L. Palmer
- Faith M. Williams
- Joseph Zubin

=== 1947 ===
- John H. Curtiss
- Milton Gilbert
- Morris H. Hansen
- William Hurwitz
- Jacob Marschak
- Herbert Marshall

=== 1948 ===
- Eugene L. Grant
- J. W. Hopkins
- Tjalling Koopmans
- W. Allen Wallis

=== 1949 ===
- Theodore Wilbur Anderson
- Walter Bartky
- Dorothy Brady
- Francis G. Cornell
- Harold F. Dodge
- Solomon Fabricant
- William Feller
- Milton Friedman
- Frank R. Garfield
- Margaret Jarman Hagood
- Hildegarde Kneeland
- Rensis Likert
- Frederick Mosteller
- Joseph J. Spengler
- Donald S. Thompson
- Warren Thompson
- Louis Leon Thurstone
- John Tukey
- Charles Winsor

=== 1950 ===
- R. G. D. Allen
- Harald Cramér
- Harold F. Dorn
- A. Ross Eckler
- Raymond J. Jessen
- A. D. H. Kaplan
- Maurice Kendall
- Alexander M. Mood
- Oskar Morgenstern
- Paul L. Olmstead
- Mortimer Spiegelman
- P. V. Sukhatme
- L. H. C. Tippett
- John Wishart
- H. C. Wold

=== 1951 ===
- Richard L. Anderson
- M. S. Bartlett
- William Forest Callander
- Jerome Cornfield
- Besse Day
- Daniel Bertrand DeLury
- Paul Summer Dwyer
- D. J. Finney
- Harold Freeman
- Emil Julius Gumbel
- Paul G. Hoel
- Vladimir Stepanovitch Kolesnidoff
- Margaret Merrell
- Bruce D. Mudgett
- K. R. Nair
- Henry Scheffé
- Henry S. Shryock Jr.
- Gerhard Tintner
- Jacob Wolfowitz
- William J. Youden

=== 1952 ===
- Oskar Anderson
- Murray R. Benedict
- Martin A. Brumbaugh
- Ewan Clague
- Dudley J. Cowden
- Frederick E. Croxton
- Paul Douglas
- W. Duane Evans
- Martin R. Gainsbrugh
- Edwin B. George
- Cyril H. Goulden
- Howard Whipple Green
- Howard C. Grieves
- Harold Gulliksen
- Anders Hald
- Howard L. Jones
- Oscar Kempthorne
- Nathan Keyfitz
- Arthur Linder
- Forrest E. Linder
- Giorgio Mortara
- Edwin G. Olds
- William R. Pabst Jr.
- Donald C. Riley
- Benedict Saurino
- Conrad Taeuber
- P. C. Tang
- Samuel Weiss

=== 1953 ===
- Maurice Belz
- Enrique Blanco
- Albert H. Bowker
- K. A. Brownlee
- Selwyn D. Collins
- Tore Dalenius
- Joseph F. Daly
- Kingsley Davis
- M. A. Teixeira De Freitas
- J. Edward Ely
- Ernest M. Fisher
- Lester Frankel
- Raymond W. Goldsmith
- Boyd Harshbarger
- H. O. Hartley
- Walter E. Hoadley
- Hans Kellerer
- Arnold J. King
- Dudley Kirk
- E. F. Lindquist
- Glenn E. McLaughlin
- Carmen A. Miró
- Harry G. Romig
- William Rae Thompson
- Alfred N. Watson
- A. E. R. Westman
- Ralph A. Young

=== 1954 ===
- Irving W. Burr
- Paul C. Clifford
- Maxwell R. Conklin
- Florence Nightingale David
- François J. Divisia
- Allen L. Edwards
- Paul Horst
- Clyde V. Kiser
- Donald Mainland
- Eli S. Marks
- J. T. Marshall
- Herbert Solomon

=== 1955 ===
- Charles A. Bicking
- John W. Boatwright
- Raymond T. Bowman
- George E. P. Box
- Miles L. Colean
- Cuthbert Daniel
- Georges Darmois
- Wilfrid Dixon
- Robert J. Eggert Sr.
- Harold F. Greenway
- Louis Guttman
- Samuel P. Hayes Jr.
- Tulo H. Montenegro
- Harold Nisselson
- Eugene W. Pike
- Grant T. Wernimont
- Frank Wilcoxon
- Theodore D. Woolsey

=== 1956 ===
- Frank Anscombe
- T. A. Bancroft
- Z. W. Birnbaum
- Donald Bogue
- Lee Cronbach
- Grove W. Ensley
- Leo Goodman
- C. Horace Hamilton
- Palmer O. Johnson
- Robert E. Johnson
- Leo Katz
- Karin Kock-Lindberg
- Paul Lazarsfeld
- Erich Leo Lehmann
- Geoffrey H. Moore
- Calvin F. Schmid
- Robert L. Thorndike

=== 1957 ===
- Max A. Bershad
- Ralph A. Bradley
- Grant I. Butterbaugh
- Samuel Lee Crump
- A. J. Duncan
- Benjamin Epstein
- Irwin Friend
- Hannes Hyrenius
- George Katona
- William C. Krumbein
- Bangnee Alfred Liu
- Frederic M. Lord
- Louis J. Paradiso
- Phillip J. Rulon
- Walter F. Ryan
- Francis X. Schumacher
- Ledyard Tucker

=== 1958 ===
- Harry Alpert
- Louis H. Bean
- David van Dantzig
- Ernest J. Engquist Jr.
- Walter T. Federer
- John W. Fertig
- Ezra Glaser
- Edwin D. Goldfield
- Wassily Hoeffding
- A. J. Jaffe
- John E. Kerrich
- William Kruskal
- Henry L. Lucas Jr.
- Ellis R. Ott
- William H. Shaw
- Herbert Sichel
- Lazare Teper
- Benjamin J. Tepping
- James Tobin
- Mary N. Torrey
- Mason E. Wescott

=== 1959 ===
- Kenneth Arrow
- Jules Backman
- Ralph E. Burgess
- Ansley J. Coale
- William S. Connor Jr.
- Clyde Coombs
- Bernard G. Greenberg
- H. C. Hamaker
- Earl E. Houseman
- Leslie Kish
- Morton Kramer
- Gerald J. Lieberman
- Dennis Lindley
- John Mandel
- Philip J. McCarthy
- Paul Meier
- Guy Orcutt
- Daniel O. Price
- Roy Reierson
- Irving H. Siegel
- Charles D. Stewart

=== 1960 ===
- Allan Birnbaum
- Joseph M. Cameron
- Edwin L. Crow
- James Durbin
- John E. Freund
- Roy C. Geary
- Samuel W. Greenhouse
- Thomas N. E. Greville
- Max Halperin
- Clifford Hildreth
- Allyn W. Kimball Jr.
- George Kuznets
- Felix E. Moore
- Almarin Phillips
- John R. H. Shaul
- Rosedith Sitgreaves
- Joseph Steinberg
- Irene Barnes Taeuber
- Milton Everett Terry
- Jan Tinbergen
- David L. Wallace
- Max A. Woodbury
- Jane Worcester

=== 1961 ===
- George A. Barnard
- Oscar K. Buros
- Harry Campion
- Douglas G. Chapman
- Herman Chernoff
- Bruno de Finetti
- Otis Dudley Duncan
- Robert Ferber
- Karl A. Fox
- Donald A. S. Fraser
- Dorothy M. Gilford
- Hendrik S. Houthakker
- John Stuart Hunter
- Howard Levene
- Prasanta Chandra Mahalanobis
- Margaret E. Martin
- W. Parker Mauldin
- Iwao M. Moriyama
- Lincoln E. Moses
- Gottfried E. Noether
- Jackson A. Rigney
- Ernest Rubin
- I. Richard Savage
- Leslie James Savage Jr.
- Robert Schlaifer
- Julius Shiskin
- Milton Sobel
- Herbert C. S. Thom

=== 1962 ===
- Moses Abramovitz
- Gertrude Bancroft
- David Blackwell
- David R. Cox
- Herbert A. David
- Samuel J. Dennis
- David B Duncan
- Maurice Irving Gershenson
- Abraham Goldberg
- Selma Fine Goldsmith
- William M. Haenszel
- Morris Hamburg
- Frank Allan Hanna
- Paul Gustav Homeyer
- Clyde Young Kramer
- Wassily Leontief
- Nathan Mantel
- John Mauchly
- Robert James Myers
- George Edward Nicholson Jr.
- Gail Barker Oakland
- Ingram Olkin
- John W. Pratt
- Howard Raiffa
- Harry V. Roberts
- Walt R. Simmons
- Martin Wilk
- Marvin Zelen

=== 1963 ===
- Robert Abelson
- Jacob E. Bearman
- Robert Bechhofer
- Howard George Brunsman
- A. Clifford Cohen Jr.
- Paul M. Densen
- Walter Elliott Duffett
- John Dana Durand
- Solomon Dutka
- George L. Edgett
- George Garvy
- Seymour Geisser
- Leon Gilford
- Harold Goldstein
- J. Roe Goodman
- Franklin A. Graybill
- John Gurland
- Millard Hastay
- Jan Hemelrijk
- Robert L. Kahn
- John Whitefield Kendrick
- Solomon Kullback
- Stanley Lebergott
- Erwin Louis LeClerg
- Fred C. Leone
- Sebastian Barkann Littauer
- Patrick Joseph Loftus
- Herman P. Miller
- Robert J. Myers
- Emanuel Parzen
- Leon Pritzker
- Richard Ruggles
- Marvin A. Schneiderman
- George Stigler
- Donovan Jerome Thompson
- Oris Vernon Wells
- Kenneth Burdg Williams
- Seymour L. Wolfbein
- Jacob Yerushalmy

=== 1964 ===
- Roberto Bachi
- Petter Jakob Bjerve
- Daniel Creamer
- Arthur P. Dempster
- James R. Duffett
- David Durand
- Alva L. Finkner
- John M. Firestone
- Spencer Mike Free Jr.
- John J. Gart
- Shanti S. Gupta
- H. Leon Harter
- Virginia Thompson Holran
- Robert Hooke
- J. Edward Jackson
- Sidney A. Jaffe
- Bernard D. Karpinos
- Nathan Morris Koffsky
- Boyd Ladd
- John B. Lansing
- Margaret P. Martin
- James Llewellyn Mc Pherson
- Marc Nerlove
- Donald B. Owen
- Lila Knudsen Randolph
- J. N. K. Rao
- Hersey E. Riley
- Abe Rothman
- John G. Saw
- Morris J. Solomon
- Harvey M. Wagner
- Joseph Waksberg
- John T. Walsh

=== 1965 ===
- Russell L. Ackoff
- Beatrice Aitchison
- K. S. Banerjee
- Dana M. Barbour
- Gary Becker
- Enrique Chacon
- Jacob B. Chassan
- C. West Churchman
- W. H. Clatworthy
- William H. Cook
- Sidney J. Cutler
- David R. Dessel
- Charles Dunnett
- Ivan Fellegi
- Charles E. Ferguson
- Donald P. Gaver
- Leon Greenberg
- Douglas Greenwald
- Zvi Griliches
- Earl O. Heady
- Daniel G. Horvitz
- Thomas B. Jabine
- George Jaszi
- Norman Lloyd Johnson
- Dale W. Jorgenson
- David L. Kaplan
- Marvin A. Kastenbaum
- John W. Lehman
- Herbert H. Marks
- Ida Craven Merriam
- Claus A. Moser
- John Neter
- Robert B. Pearl
- Frank Proschan
- Norman C. Severo
- Monroe G. Sirken
- Alan Stuart
- Daniel Teichroew
- Malcolm E. Turner Jr.
- Slobodan S. Zarkovich

=== 1966 ===
- Jack Alterman
- V. Lewis Bassie
- Carl A. Bennett
- Hugh D. Brunk
- Arnold E. Chase
- Lawrence V. Conway
- Morris H. DeGroot
- Edward F. Denison
- Cyrus Derman
- Sylvain Ehrenfeld
- Carl L. Erhardt
- Holly C. Fryer
- Clayton Gehman
- Robert J. Hader
- William J. Hall
- James W. Knowles
- Helen Humes Lamale
- Albert Madansky
- Frank J. Massey Jr.
- Robert J. Monroe
- Vito Natrella
- Jack L. Ogus
- Ingvar Ohlsson
- Ruth Rice Puffer
- Ronald Pyke
- George J. Resnikoff
- Douglas S. Robson
- David Rosenblatt
- Ahmed Ebada Sarhan
- Walter L. Smith
- Geoffrey Watson
- Louis Weiner

=== 1967 ===
- Abraham Aidenoff
- Richard E. Barlow
- Geoffrey Beall
- Ronald H. Beattie
- Herbert Bienstock
- Howard Brill
- Byron W.M. Brown Jr.
- Robert J. Buehler
- Arthur A. Campbell
- Richard A. Freund
- Donald A. Gardiner
- Edmund A. Gehan
- Paul C. Glick
- Robert V. Hogg
- David V. Huntsberger
- F. Thomas Juster
- Salem H. Khamis
- Ingrid C. Kildegaard
- Paruchuri R. Krishnaiah
- Philip S. Lawrence
- Robert E. Lipsey
- Richard B. McHugh
- Jacob Mincer
- Sigeiti Moriguti
- Nathan Morrison
- Ganapati P. Patil
- Joan R. Rosenblatt
- Arthur M. Ross
- Sam Shapiro
- Harry Smith Jr
- Julian Stanley
- William F. Taylor
- Ralph S. Woodruff

=== 1968 ===
- Sidney Addelman
- Leo A. Aroian
- Lyle D. Calvin
- Chin Long Chiang
- Richard G. Cornell
- C. Philip Cox
- Olive Jean Dunn
- Gerald J. Glasser
- Ramanathan Gnanadesikan
- Arthur Goldberger
- Zakkula Govindarajulu
- James E. Grizzle
- Robert D. Grove
- William C. Guenther
- Margaret Gurney
- Bernard Harris
- Charles Roy Henderson
- Evelyn M. Kitagawa
- Milos Macura
- David D. Mason
- Albert Mindlin
- Paul D. Minton
- James N. Morgan
- Donald F. Morrison
- Milton Moss
- Raymond Nassimbene
- Arthur M. Okun
- Alan Ross
- Oswald K. Sagen
- Hilary L. Seal
- Shayle R. Searle
- Daniel B. Suits
- Lester G. Telser
- Henri Theil
- Harry C. Trelogan

=== 1969 ===
- Om P. Aggarwal
- Virgil L. Anderson
- Lenore E. Bixby
- Irwin D. J. Bross
- George W. Brown
- Theodore Colton
- Marie D. Eldridge
- Robert C. Elston
- William A. Ericson
- K. Ruben Gabriel
- John P. Gilbert
- Vidyadhar P. Godambe
- Bruce W. Kelly
- John C. Koop
- Charles B. Lawrence Jr.
- Everett S. Lee
- C. C. Li
- Julius Lieblein
- Eugene Lukacs
- Colin L. Mallows
- Rupert G. Miller Jr.
- Jack Moshman
- Eva L. Mueller
- Jack Nadler
- Lloyd S. Nelson
- Wesley L. Nicholson
- K. C. Sreedharan Pillai
- Richard Platek
- Harry M. Rosenblatt
- Pranab K. Sen
- David A. Sprott
- Robert G. Steel
- Alan B. Sunter
- Erling Sverdrup
- James S. Williams

=== 1970 ===
- Anita K. Bahn
- Ishver S. Bangdiwala
- Charles B. Bell Jr.
- Wallace R. Blischke
- George Hay Brown
- Edward C. Bryant
- Carl Christ
- Arthur M. Dutton
- Bradley Efron
- Robert M. Elashoff
- Lila Elveback
- Joseph Gastwirth
- Shriniwas K. Katti
- Chinubhai G. Khatri
- Jan Kmenta
- Samuel Kotz
- Harry H. H. Ku
- Malcolm R. Leadbetter
- Daniel B. Levine
- Abraham Lilienfeld
- Nancy Mann
- Jerome A. Mark
- Max R. Mickey Jr.
- M. N. Murthy
- Patrick L. Odell
- Bernard Ostle
- Joel Popkin
- Irving Rottenberg
- Jagdish S. Rustagi
- Sam C. Saunders
- Martin Schatzoff
- Robert S. Schultz III
- Mindel C. Sheps
- M. M. Siddiqui
- John H. Smith
- Jaya Srivastava
- John R. Stockton
- W. A. Thompson Jr.
- Beatrice N. Vaccara
- Colin White
- William H. Williams
- Arnold Zellner

=== 1971 ===
- David W. Alling
- Rolf E. Bargmann
- Saul Blumenthal
- R. Darrell Bock
- Mavis B. Carroll
- Martin H. David
- Norman R. Draper
- Morris L. Eaton
- Jacob J. Feldman
- J. Leroy Folks
- Ronald Freedman
- Narayan C. Giri
- Morris R. Goldman
- John A. Hartigan
- Hyman B. Kaitz
- Karol J. Krótki
- Joseph Kruskal
- Richard G. Krutchkoff
- Anant M. Kshirsagar
- James E. Mosimann
- Cristina Parel
- Bernard S. Pasternack
- Madan L. Puri
- Dana Quade
- B. Leo Raktoe
- Ernest M. Scheuer
- Jayaram Sethuraman
- Eleanor Bernert Sheldon
- Leonard R. Shenton
- B. V. Sukhatme
- Michael E. Tarter
- V. R. Uppuluri
- D. Ransom Whitney
- Marshall K. Wood
- George Zyskind

=== 1972 ===
- David R. Brillinger
- Ben Burdetsky
- Arthur Cohen
- Morris N. Cohen
- Edwin B. Cox
- Satya D. Dubey
- Philip E. Enterline
- James D. Esary
- Stephen Fienberg
- Wayne Fuller
- Jean D. Gibbons
- Leon J. Gleser
- Tavia Gordon
- J. Richard Grant
- Harold W. Guthrie
- Irwin Guttman
- Irene Hess
- Bruce M. Hill
- Myles Hollander
- Carl E. Hopkins
- Denis F. Johnston
- Harold A. Kahn
- Balvant K. Kale
- Shirley Kallek
- Bundhit Kantabutra
- Robert W. Kennard
- Gary G. Koch
- H. S. Konijn
- Ernest Kurnow
- Benoit Mandelbrot
- Ann R. Miller
- Sylvia Ostry
- Edward B. Perrin
- Earl S. Pollack
- Prem S. Puri
- C. R. Rao
- Stanley Schor
- E. Fred Schultz
- H. Fairfield Smith
- George P. Steck
- Chris P. Tsokos
- John W. Wilkinson

=== 1973 ===
- John J. Bartko
- Gilbert W. Beebe
- Peter J. Bickel
- Edgar Bisgyer
- Raj Chandra Bose
- Richard C. Clelland
- Richard Cyert
- Somesh Das Gupta
- Constance van Eeden
- Joseph L. Fleiss
- I. J. Good
- Gerald J. Hahn
- Sam Hedayat
- Ronald R. Hocking
- Seymour Jablon
- Joseph Born Kadane
- Lambert H. Koopmans
- Badrig M. Kurkjian
- C. Michael Lanphier
- Peter A. W. Lewis
- B. W. Lindgren
- Martin L. Marimont
- Donald R. Mc Neil
- Paul W. Mielke Jr.
- Vrudhula K. Murthy
- Wayne B. Nelson
- Melvin R. Novick
- Charles P. Quesenberry
- Carl-Erik Särndal
- Leopold Schmetterer
- Amode R. Sen
- Robert J. Serfling
- Jacob S. Siegel
- Joseph V. Talacko
- George C. Tiao
- H. Bradley Wells
- Shelly Zacks

=== 1974 ===
- Arthur E. Albert
- Vasant P. Bhapkar
- Hubert M. Blalock Jr.
- Glenn W. Brier
- E. Earl Bryant
- Helen C. Chase
- John S. Chipman
- Gregory Chow
- Virginia A. Clark
- Fred Ederer
- Murray A. Geisler
- Goldine Gleser
- Arnold F. Goodman
- William L. Hays
- David G. Hoel
- Harold F. Huddleston
- Karl G. Jöreskog
- Jack Kiefer
- Henry O. Lancaster
- Gilles Laurent
- William H. Lawton
- Richard F. Link
- Barry H. Margolin
- Raymond H. Myers
- Janet L. Norwood
- Junjiro Ogawa
- Mollie Orshansky
- Ewan Stafford Page
- Edward Pollak
- S. James Press
- Judah Rosenblatt
- Norman B. Ryder
- Nozer D. Singpurwalla
- Marie Wann
- Wilfred J. Westlake

=== 1975 ===
- Barbara A. Bailar
- John C. Bailar III
- Yvonne Bishop
- Colin R. Blyth
- Mark Brown
- James M. Dickey
- Joseph W. Duncan
- Otto Eckstein
- John W. Gorman
- William L. Harkness
- David A. Harville
- David Hogben
- Paul W. Holland
- James G. Kalbfleisch
- Robert E. Lewis
- Donald Marquardt
- Bruce J. Mc Donald
- Mervin E. Muller
- Michael D. Perlman
- Edward G. Schilling
- Seymour M. Selig
- William Seltzer
- Michael A. Stephens
- Jack E. Triplett
- Graham B. Wetherill
- R. Keith Zeigler

=== 1976 ===
- Helen Abbey
- John H. Aiken
- Vincent Barabba
- Kimiko O. Bowman
- Norman Breslow
- Manning Feinleib
- David G. Gosslee
- Joseph Albert Greenwood
- Robert H. Hanson
- Peter W. M. John
- M. Vernon Johns Jr.
- Brian L. Joiner
- Richard Hunn Jones
- Gunnar Kulldorff
- Regina Loewenstein
- Anders S. Lunde
- Paul McCracken
- Robert Parke
- Richard E. Remington
- Jeanne Clare Ridley
- Sally Ronk
- Richard M. Royall
- Richard M. Scammon
- Stephen Stigler
- John Van Ryzin
- Harry Weingarten
- Victor Zarnowitz

=== 1977 ===
- David F. Andrews
- Joseph L. Ciminera
- John S. De Cani
- Fred Frishman
- David W. Gaylor
- Charles D. Jones
- Kanti Mardia
- Jane Menken
- Robin Plackett
- Des Raj
- Dorothy P. Rice
- Harry M. Rosenberg
- Irving Roshwalb
- Donald Rubin
- Ray E. Schafer
- Daniel G. Seigel
- Patricia Shontz
- Ronald D. Snee
- Paul Switzer
- Kenneth T. Wallenius
- Hans Zeisel
- Meyer Zitter

=== 1978 ===
- Abdelmonem A. Afifi
- Takeshi Amemiya
- Joseph R. Assenzo
- Robert G. Easterling
- Janet D. Elashoff
- Alan E. Gelfand
- Robert M. Hauser
- Susan Horn
- Kenneth Land
- Carl M. Metzler
- Krishnan Namboodiri
- Gad Nathan
- David Salsburg
- John W. Van Ness
- Donald G. Watts
- John T. Webster
- Allan H. Young
- Dudley E. Young

=== 1979 ===
- Debabrata Basu
- Abraham J. Berman
- Gouri K. Bhattacharyya
- William J. Blot
- Robert E. Bohrer
- J. Douglas Carroll
- Ana Casís
- William Jay Conover
- Frank Denton
- Paul I. Feder
- Polly Feigl
- Lloyd D. Fisher
- Martin R. Frankel
- William J. Hemmerle
- David Hinkley
- William C. Hunter
- Robert A. Israel
- William J. Kennedy
- Carl F. Kossack
- Mary Grace Kovar
- Peter A. Lachenbruch
- Robert J. Lundegard
- William Mendenhall III
- Toby J. Mitchell
- Beatrice S. Orleans
- David A. Pierce
- Richard E. Quandt
- Ronald H. Randles
- Tim Robertson
- Edward Wegman

=== 1980 ===
- James R. Abernathy
- Lynne Billard
- Christopher Bingham
- John M. Chambers
- Otto Dykstra Jr.
- Paul E. Green
- Chester W. Harris
- David C. Hoaglin
- Alan T. James
- J. Aneurin John
- Richard A. Johnson
- Graham Kalton
- Roy R. Kuebler Jr.
- M. Clinton Miller III
- Roger H. Moore
- Charles Nam
- Burton H. Singer
- Judith Tanur
- Grace Wahba
- Calvin Zippin

=== 1981 ===
- Hirotugu Akaike
- Barry C. Arnold
- Jesse C. Arnold
- David W. Bacon
- Noel S. Bartlett
- Donald W. Behnken
- Thomas J. Boardman
- Barbara Boyes
- David P. Byar
- Lai Kow Chan
- Estelle Bee Dagum
- Edward J. Dudewicz
- William H. DuMouchel
- George T. Duncan
- Michael Gent
- James Goodnight
- Donald Guthrie
- Robert I. Jennrich
- Jon R. Kettenring
- William E. Kibler
- Richard A. Kronmal
- Charles E. Land
- Mary Gibbons Natrella
- Robert E. Odeh
- John E. Patterson
- Donald A. Pierce
- John S. Ramberg
- Naomi D. Rothwell
- Thomas A. Ryan Jr.
- Fritz J. Scheuren
- William R. Schucany
- Joseph Sedransk
- Theodor D. Sterling
- Edward Tufte
- Roy E. Welsch
- Fred S. Wood

=== 1982 ===
- Charles F. Cannell
- Raymond J. Carroll
- William S. Cleveland
- R. Dennis Cook
- William F. Eddy
- Jonas H. Ellenberg
- James E. Gentle
- María Elena González Mederos
- Henry L. Gray
- Robert Groves
- William J. Hill
- Arthur E. Hoerl
- Ronald L. Iman
- Eva E. Jacobs
- Emil H. Jebe
- Beat Kleiner
- Gary C. McDonald
- David S. Moore
- Ross Prentice
- Samuel H. Preston
- Carol K. Redmond
- Francisco J. Samaniego
- Josef Schmee
- Justus F. Seely
- B. V. Shah
- Stanley L. Warner
- William Weiss
- Kirk M. Wolter
- Farroll T. Wright

=== 1983 ===
- Asit P. Basu
- Norman Bradburn
- Jacob Cohen
- Mitchell H. Gail
- A. Ronald Gallant
- Jane F. Gentleman
- Francis G. Giesbrecht
- Bert F. Green Jr.
- Shelby J. Haberman
- Agnes M. Herzberg
- Klaus Hinkelmann
- Lawrence J. Hubert
- V. S. Huzurbazar
- Dallas E. Johnson
- Benjamin F. King
- Donald W. King
- Nan Laird
- Robert L. Launer
- Jerald F. Lawless
- William Q. Meeker Jr.
- Carl N. Morris
- Subhash C. Narula
- William J. Padgett
- Albert J. Reiss
- Charles B. Sampson
- Richard L. Scheaffer
- Alastair John Scott
- Beatrice Shube
- Jack Silber
- Courtenay Slater
- T. M. F. Smith
- Miron L. Straf
- Seymour Sudman
- Robert E. Tarone
- Katherine Wallman
- Robert L. Winkler

=== 1984 ===
- Murray Aitkin
- Lee J. Bain
- James T. Bonnen
- John A. Cornell
- John A. Flueck
- Rudolf J. Freund
- Jerome H. Friedman
- Charles E. Gates
- Malay Ghosh
- Prem K. Goel
- Charles H. Goldsmith
- C. Terrence Ireland
- Michael H. Kutner
- Kathleen Lamborn
- Robert F. Ling
- Pamela Morse
- Judith O'Fallon
- Harry O. Posten
- Richard Macey Simon
- Daniel L. Solomon
- W. Allen Spivey
- William E. Strawderman
- James R. Thompson
- Graham Neil Wilkinson

=== 1985 ===
- James O. Berger
- Albert D. Biderman
- Donna J. Brogan
- Thomas S. Ferguson
- A. Blanton Godfrey
- Richard F. Gunst
- John E. Hewett
- Gordon M. Kaufman
- Lynn Roy LaMotte
- Roderick J. A. Little
- Ian B. MacNeill
- Robert T. O'Neill
- Robert P. Parker
- Gladys H. Reynolds
- Wray Jackson Smith
- Mary E. Thompson
- Bruce W. Turnbull
- Howard Wainer
- C. F. Jeff Wu

=== 1986 ===
- Murray Aborn
- Donald A. Berry
- Walter H. Carter Jr.
- Noel Cressie
- David L. DeMets
- Kjell A. Doksum
- Joseph M. Gani
- Thomas P. Hettmansperger
- Bruce Hoadley
- Lawrence L. Kupper
- Tze Leung Lai
- Ramon C. Littell
- Glen D. Meeden
- W. Michael O'Fallon
- George G. Roussas
- Paul N. Somerville
- Muni S. Srivastava
- Kenneth W. Wachter
- Lee-Jen Wei
- Douglas A. Wolfe

=== 1987 ===
- Rudolf J. Beran
- Gordon J. Brackstone
- Leo Breiman
- Barry W. Brown
- Charles C. Brown
- Constance F. Citro
- Clifford C. Clogg
- Joel E. Cohen
- Lawrence H. Cox
- Richard L. Dykstra
- Robert E. Fay
- David F. Findley
- Thomas R. Fleming
- Roger A. Herriot
- John D. Kalbfleisch
- Helena C. Kraemer
- J. Richard Landis
- David A. Lane
- Eugene M. Laska
- John P. Lehoczky
- James M. Lucas
- Robert L. Mason
- James H. Matis
- Larry Alan Nelson
- Charles L. Odoroff
- Jerome Sacks
- Wesley L. Schaible
- Samuel S. Shapiro
- Paul F. Velleman
- James H. Ware
- Rita Zemach

=== 1988 ===
- David M. Allen
- José-Miguel Bernardo
- U. Narayan Bhat
- George Casella
- James R. Chromy
- John J. Crowley
- Stephen L. George
- Ethel Gilbert
- A. Lawrence Gould
- Martha S. Hearron
- Mark E. Johnson
- Stephen W. Lagakos
- Thomas J. Lorenzen
- Thomas A. Louis
- Robert B. Miller Jr.
- William K. Poole
- Daryl Pregibon
- John E. Rolph
- Juliet Popper Shaffer
- Robert H. Shumway
- Abraham Silvers
- Mangala P. Singh
- Malcolm S. Taylor
- Ronald A. Thisted
- Yung L. Tong
- Paul A. Tukey
- N. Scott Urquhart
- Gerald van Belle
- Willem R. Van Zwet
- Stephen B. Vardeman
- Sanford Weisberg
- James V. Zidek

=== 1989 ===
- Phipps Arabie
- William A. Barnett
- Richard J. Beckman
- David R. Bellhouse
- Kenneth N. Berk
- Robert F. Boruch
- Kenny S. Crump Sr.
- Cathryn S. Dippo
- Allan P. Donner
- Zvi Gilula
- Alan Greenspan
- Arjun K. Gupta
- Joseph K. Haseman
- John M. Lachin III
- Kinley Larntz
- George A. Milliken
- Warren Mitofsky
- Thomas J. Plewes
- Nancy Reid
- David Ruppert
- Ester Samuel-Cahn
- Thomas J. Santner
- Terry Speed
- J. Michael Steele
- Alice S. Whittemore
- Janet Wittes
- Eric R. Ziegel

=== 1990 ===
- Alan Agresti
- Richard A. Becker
- Donald Bentley
- Kenneth P. Burnham
- Ralph B. D'Agostino
- Siddhartha R. Dalal
- Maxwell E. Engelhardt
- John F. Geweke
- Douglas M. Hawkins
- D. Tim Holt
- Daniel Kasprzyk
- Robert Kass
- Joel C. Kleinman
- Dan Krewski
- James M. Landwehr
- Robert M. Loynes
- David R. Morganstein
- Vijayan Nair
- Karl E. Peace
- Daniel Pfeffermann
- D. Raghavarao
- Barbara Falkenbach Ryan
- Allan R. Sampson
- Lilly Sanathanan
- William W. Scherkenbach
- David W. Scott
- David L. Sylwester
- Anastasios A. Tsiatis
- Jessica Utts
- Robert F. Woolson
- Ronald E. Wyzga
- Sidney Stanley Young

=== 1991 ===
- Rich Allen
- David A. Binder
- Henry I. Braun
- Peter J. Brockwell
- Gale Rex Bryce
- Richard K. Burdick
- Robert J. Casady
- Larry H. Crow
- Lorraine Denby
- James E. Dunn
- Susan S. Ellenberg
- Eugene P. Ericksen
- Nicholas I. Fisher
- Judith Goldberg
- Tyler D. Hartwell
- Nicholas P. Jewell
- Diane Lambert
- Johannes Ledolter
- Peter C. O'Brien
- Olga Pendleton
- Gordon Rausser
- Bruce E. Rodda
- John H. Schuenemeyer
- Eugene F. Schuster
- Ajit C. Tamhane
- Robert L. Taylor
- Luke Tierney
- Robert K. Tsutakawa
- William T. Tucker
- Stanley Wasserman
- Susan R. Wilson
- Donald Ylvisaker

=== 1992 ===
- Douglas M. Bates
- Paul P. Biemer
- Patrick L. Brockett
- Daniel B. Carr
- Naihua Duan
- Nancy Flournoy
- Alan J. Gross
- David P. Harrington
- Lyle V. Jones
- André I. Khuri
- Ralph L. Kodell
- Abba M. Krieger
- Kuang-Kuo Gordon Lan
- James M. Lepkowski
- Judith T. Lessler
- Ruth E. Marcus
- Harry F. Martz
- Daniel McGee
- Clyde A. McGilchrist
- Peter R. Nelson
- Colm A. O'Muircheartaigh
- Christopher J. Portier
- John O. Rawlings
- Paul R. Rosenbaum
- David A. Schoenfeld
- Jon J. Shuster
- Adrian F. M. Smith
- Bruce D. Spencer
- Clifford H. Spiegelman
- John D. Spurrier
- David J. Strauss
- Aaron Tenenbein
- Barbara Tilley
- Ruey-Shiong Tsay
- Richard L. Valliant
- Harry S. Wieand
- Sandy L. Zabell

=== 1993 ===
- Bovas Abraham
- Stanley Paul Azen
- William R. Bell
- Henry W. Block
- Peter Bloomfield
- Charles E. Caudill
- Nanjamma Chinnappa
- George W. Cobb
- Loveday L. Conquest
- Kathryn B. Davis
- David A. Freedman
- Richard D. Gelber
- Nancy Geller
- D. V. Gokhale
- Berton H. Gunter
- Hermann Habermann
- Ronald W. Helms
- Sreenivasa Rao Jammalamadaka
- Nancy Kirkendall
- Edward L. Korn
- Lars Lyberg
- John F. MacGregor
- George P. McCabe
- Christine E. McLaren
- Douglas C. Montgomery
- David Oakes
- Peter C. B. Phillips
- Dale L. Preston
- Louise M. Ryan
- Mark J. Schervish
- John R. Schultz
- Bimal Kumar Sinha
- Robert T. Smythe
- George Tauchen
- Stephen D. Walter
- Mike West
- Douglas A. Zahn

=== 1994 ===
- Luigi Biggeri
- Mary Ellen Bock
- Andreas Buja
- Gail F. Burrill
- Kathryn Chaloner
- Samprit Chatterjee
- Clarence E. Davis
- Beth K. Dawson
- Persi Diaconis
- Paula Diehr
- Dennis O. Dixon
- Richard M. Dudley
- Dianne M. Finkelstein
- Joel B. Greenhouse
- Lynne B. Hare
- Yosef Hochberg
- Roger W. Hoerl
- Dean Isaacson
- Raghu N. Kacker
- Karen Kafadar
- Denise Lievesley
- Jay H. Lubin
- Peter McCullagh
- Max D. Morris
- Robb J. Muirhead
- Mary Mulry
- James D. Neaton
- Desmond F. Nicholls
- Paula Norwood
- J. Keith Ord
- Marcello Pagano
- Gordon W. Pledger
- David Pollard
- Stephen L. Portnoy
- Stanley Presser
- Adrian Raftery
- Gregory C. Reinsel
- Peter Rousseeuw
- Stephen Ruberg
- Christopher John Skinner
- Joseph N. Skwish
- William Boyce Smith
- Donna F. Stroup
- Martin A. Tanner
- Robert D. Tortora
- Bruce E. Trumbo
- Donald J. Wheeler
- Margaret C. Wu
- Linda J. Young

=== 1995 ===
- Susan Ahmed
- Dan Anbar
- Narayanaswamy Balakrishnan
- John E. Boyer
- Kenneth R. W. Brewer
- Shein-Chung Chow
- Brenda G. Cox
- Angela Dean
- Jay L. Devore
- Don A. Dillman
- Keith R. Eberhardt
- Reynolds Farley
- Ralph E. Folsom Jr.
- Mary Foulkes
- Daniel Gianola
- Stephanie J. Green
- MaryAnn Hill
- Marthana Hjortland
- Boris Iglewicz
- Alan J. Izenman
- Iain M. Johnstone
- Richard J. Kryscio
- Jack C. Lee
- Stanley A. Lemeshow
- Kung-Yee Liang
- Ira Longini
- Cyrus R. Mehta
- Michael M. Meyer
- Jerry L. Moreno
- Carolyn Morgan
- Hans-Georg Mueller
- H. Joseph Newton
- Harji I. Patel
- Walter W. Piegorsch
- Richard F. Potthoff
- Martha Farnsworth Riche
- David M. Rocke
- Keith F. Rust
- A. K. Md. Ehsanes Saleh
- Nathaniel Schenker
- W. Robert Stephenson
- C. M. Suchindran
- Wai-Yuan Tan
- William G. Warren
- Clarice Weinberg
- Jeffrey A. Witmer
- Tommy Wright
- Scott L. Zeger

=== 1996 ===
- Colin Begg
- Rajendra J. Bhansali
- Jean-Louis Bodin
- J. Michael Brick
- Ron Brookmeyer
- James J. Chen
- Ronald Christensen
- Jonathan D. Cryer
- Barry R. Davis
- E. Jacquelin Dietz
- Necip Doganaksoy
- Abdel H. El-Shaarawi
- Emerson J. Elliott
- Mark A. Espeland
- Betty Flehinger
- Laurence S. Freedman
- Edward L. Frome
- Gerald W. Gates
- Christian Genest
- Richard O. Gilbert
- Patricia Grambsch
- Peter Gavin Hall
- Betz Halloran
- Lee-Ann C. Hayek
- David W. Hosmer Jr.
- Michael C. Jones
- Phillip Kott
- Ronald E. Kutscher
- Anthony James Lawrance
- Elisa T. Lee
- Charles R. Mann
- Charles E. McCulloch
- Richard A. Olshen
- S. R. S. Rao Poduri
- Kenneth H. Pollock
- Fred L. Ramsey
- Jeffrey A. Robinson
- Kathryn Roeder
- James L. Rosenberger
- Bernard Rosner
- Neil C. Schwertman
- Steve G. Self
- Jerome N. Senturia
- Weichung J. Shih
- Jeffrey S. Simonoff
- J. Laurie Snell
- Herbert F. Spirer
- Donald M. Stablein
- Leonard A. Stefanski
- Jeremy M. G. Taylor
- Chih-Ling Tsai
- Clyde Tucker
- Sholom Wacholder
- Ray A. Waller
- Larry A. Wasserman
- Sam Weerahandi
- William E. Winkler
- Ann Dryden Witte
- Wayne A. Woodward
- George G. Woodworth

=== 1997 ===
- Juha M. Alho
- Gutti Jogesh Babu
- Shaul K. Bar-Lev
- M. J. Bayarri
- L. Mark Berliner
- Soren Bisgaard
- James M. Boyett
- Charles R. Buncher
- JeAnne Burg
- Tar Timothy Chen
- Vernon Chinchilli
- Joan Sander Chmiel
- Sung C. Choi
- Cynthia Clark
- Steven B. Cohen
- Delores Conway
- Victor G. De Gruttola
- Dipak K. Dey
- Don Edwards
- Peter Enis
- Luis A. Escobar
- Bernhard Flury
- Alan B. Forsythe
- Edward W. Frees
- Edward I. George
- Ramesh C. Gupta
- Ali S. Hadi
- Marc Hallin
- Daniel F. Heitjan
- Joseph Heyse
- Huynh Huynh
- Cary T. Isaki
- Wesley Orin Johnson
- William D. Kalsbeek
- Alan F. Karr
- Jerome P. Keating
- Sallie Ann Keller
- Marek Kimmel
- Shaw-Hwa Lo
- James T. Massey
- Holly Matthews
- Robert E. McCulloch
- Robert L. Obenchain
- Alvin C. Rencher
- John A. Rice
- Winston Ashton Richards
- Rosemary Roberts
- Roland Rust
- Friedrich W. Scholz
- Jagbir Singh
- Robert R. Starbuck
- Elizabeth Stasny
- Richard Tweedie
- Martin T. Wells
- Peter H. Westfall
- William H. Woodall
- Alan M. Zaslavsky

=== 1998 ===
- Mir Masoom Ali
- Margo J. Anderson
- Arlene Ash
- Robert M. Bell
- Dwight B. Brock
- Barbara Everitt Bryant
- Gregory Campbell
- Christy Chuang-Stein
- Dennis D. Cox
- Marie Davidian
- Robert L. Davis
- Richard D. De Veaux
- Tisha Duggan
- Ronald S. Fecso
- Valerii V. Fedorov
- Constantine Gatsonis
- Andrew Gelman
- Subir Ghosh
- Sander Greenland
- Chien-Pai Han
- Trevor Hastie
- Michael A. Hidiroglou
- Sheryl F. Kelsey
- Arthur B. Kennickell
- Paul S. Levy
- Dennis K.J. Lin
- Bruce G. Lindsay
- Wei-Yin Loh
- Stephen W. Looney
- James Stephen Marron
- Elizabeth A. Martin
- Lyman L. McDonald
- Geoffrey McLachlan
- Thomas L. Moore
- Joseph I. Naus
- Joyce C. Niland
- Shizuhiko Nishisato
- Terence John O'Neill
- Roxy Peck
- Jane Pendergast
- Amy H. K. Racine-Poon
- James B. Ramsey
- James Robins
- Javier Rojo
- Peter E. Rossi
- Andrew L. Rukhin
- Harold B. Sackrowitz
- John Sall
- Hal S. Stern
- S. Lynne Stokes
- Chih-Ming Wang
- Jane-Ling Wang
- Mei-Cheng Wang
- Leland Wilkinson
- George W. Williams
- Judy Zeh
- Daniel Zelterman

=== 1999 ===
- Charles H. Alexander Jr
- Martha Aliaga
- Charles Anello
- John Bailer
- Mark P. Becker
- Roger Lee Berger
- Jane M. Booker
- Bradley P. Carlin
- Alicia L. Carriquiry
- Ching-Shui Cheng
- Gregory Enas
- Michael J. Evans
- Jianqing Fan
- Arthur Fries
- Beth Gladen
- Larry V. Hedges
- Vicki Hertzberg
- James J. Higgins
- Jonathan R. M. Hosking
- Joseph G. Ibrahim
- Valen E. Johnson
- Benjamin Kedem
- Mei-Ling Ting Lee
- Albert M. Liebetrau
- David Madigan
- Joseph W. McKean
- Alvaro Munoz
- Per Aslak Mykland
- William L. Nicholls II
- Giovanni Parmigiani
- Charles A. Rohde
- N. Phillip Ross
- Sanat K. Sarkar
- Jun Shao
- Ehsan S. Soofi
- Keith A. Soper
- Michael L. Stein
- George P. H. Styan
- Roy Noriki Tamura
- H. Dennis Tolley
- Roger E. Tourangeau
- Mark G. Vangel
- Ann E. Watkins
- Daniel H. Weinberg
- Bruce Weir
- Lisa Weissfeld
- Robert L. Wolpert
- Wing Hung Wong
- Mark C. Yang
- Zhiliang Ying
- Stuart O. Zimmerman

=== 2000 ===
- Ibrahim A. Ahmad
- James H. Albert
- Douglas Anderton
- Anestis Antoniadis
- Charles K. Bayne
- Brent A. Blumenstein
- James A. Calvin
- Lynda Carlson
- William G. Cumberland
- Veronica Czitrom
- David Dickey
- Benjamin S. Duran
- Robert F. Engle
- Kathy Ensor
- Randall L. Eubank
- Eric Jeffrey Feuer
- Joseph Glaz
- Nancy Gordon
- Barry I. Graubard
- Timothy G. Gregoire
- Michael S. Hamada
- Donald R. Hedeker
- Steven C. Hillmer
- Genshirō Kitagawa
- Kenneth J. Koehler
- Danyu Lin
- Xihong Lin
- Robin H. Lock
- Sharon Lohr
- Agustín Maravall
- John D. McKenzie Jr.
- Sally C. Morton
- Haikady N. Nagaraja
- Anthony R. Olsen
- Franz Palm
- Linda Williams Pickle
- Dale J. Poirier
- Marion R. Reynolds Jr.
- Robert H. Riffenburgh
- Paula Roberson
- Frank W. Rockhold
- Thomas P. Ryan
- Ashish Sen
- Douglas G. Simpson
- Richard L. Smith
- Edward J. Spar
- Gábor J. Székely
- Thomas R. Tenhave
- John H. Thompson
- Edward F. Vonesh
- Preston J. Waite
- Matthew P. Wand
- Suojin Wang
- Andrei Y. Yakovlev
- Heping Zhang

=== 2001 ===
- Michael Akritas
- Yasuo Amemiya
- Richard T. Baillie
- Karen Bandeen-Roche
- David L. Banks
- Richard A. Berk
- William C. Blackwelder
- Dennis Boos
- Kung-Sik Chan
- Michael R. Chernick
- Siddhartha Chib
- Jan de Leeuw
- Peter Diggle
- Patricia J. Doyle
- Marlene J. Egger
- Stephen G. Eick
- Fang Kaitai
- Joan Garfield
- Eric Ghysels
- Robert D. Gibbons
- David M. Giltinan
- Peter Guttorp
- Jeffrey D. Hart
- James Heckman
- Nancy E. Heckman
- Howard R. Hogan
- Jason C. Hsu
- Bruce Levin
- Kung-Jong Lui
- Thomas Mathew
- William I. Notz
- Gregory F. Piepel
- Elvezio Ronchetti
- Allan J. Rossman
- Daniel W. Schafer
- Simon J. Sheather
- Eric P. Smith
- Steven M. Snapinn
- Donna Spiegelman
- Joan Staniswalis
- John Stufken
- Steven K. Thompson
- Wei Yann Tsai
- Hans van Houwelingen
- G. Geoffrey Vining
- Naisyin Wang
- Andrew A. White
- Dale L. Zimmerman

=== 2002 ===
- Demissie Alemayehu
- Edward J. Bedrick
- Michael Lee Boehnke
- Carolee Bush
- Rong Chen
- Avital Cnaan
- Michael L. Cohen
- Richard A. Davis
- Anthony C. Davison
- Darryl J. Downing
- John L. Eltinge
- Frederick W. Faltin
- Irène Gijbels
- Richard F. Goldstein
- Carol A. Gotway Crawford
- Martin A. Hamilton
- Kenneth W. Harris
- Melvin J. Hinich
- Michael D. Hughes
- John P Klein
- Richard A. Kulka
- Soumendra N. Lahiri
- Russell V. Length
- Jennifer Madans
- Linda Malone
- Robert W. Mee
- Edward L. Melnick
- Susan Murphy
- Sharon-Lise Normand
- Douglas W. Nychka
- Sastry G. Pantula
- Dennis K. Pearl
- Peter N. Peduzzi
- Edsel A. Pena
- Carey E. Priebe
- Marepalli B. Rao
- Wasima N. Rida
- David Rindskopf
- Pat Ruggles
- Mark D. Schluchter
- Peter J. Schmidt
- Nell Sedransk
- Stephanie Shipp
- Randy R. Sitter
- Dalene Stangl
- Moon W. Suh
- William W. S. Wei
- Alan H. Welsh

=== 2003 ===
- Katharine Abraham
- Lee R. Abramson
- Greg M. Allenby
- Mary Batcher
- Jay M. Bennett
- Rebecca Betensky
- Lawrence D. Brown
- Philip J. Brown
- Cavell Brownie
- George Y. H. Chi
- Cindy L. Christiansen
- John L. Czajka
- Philip M. Dixon
- James J. Filliben
- Garrett M. Fitzmaurice
- Dean A. Follmann
- Wing K. Fung
- Richard M. Heiberger
- James S. Hodges
- Burt S. Holland
- Carol House
- John T. Kent
- Ravindra Khattree
- Hira L. Koul
- Lynn Kuo
- Wai K. Li
- Robert W. Makuch
- Geert Molenberghs
- Peter Mueller
- Nitis Mukhopadhyay
- Balgobin Nandram
- Margaret A. Nemeth
- John M. Neuhaus
- Robert L. Newcomb
- Sarah Nusser
- Nitin Patel
- Trivellore E. Raghunathan
- Gary L. Rosner
- Glen A. Satten
- Nathan E. Savin
- Thomas H. Savits
- Marilyn Seastrom
- Mark R. Segal
- C. Frank Shen
- Nancy Spruill
- Neal Thomas
- Ram C. Tiwari
- Kwokleung Tsui
- Alan R. Tupek
- Harrison Wadsworth Jr.
- Lance A. Waller
- Ronald L. Wasserstein
- Robert E. Weiss
- Robert A. Wolfe

=== 2004 ===
- I. Elaine Allen
- Peter Bacchetti
- Laurel Beckett
- Thomas R. Belin
- Jesse A. Berlin
- James G. Booth
- R. Ronald Bosecker
- F. Jay Breidt
- Raymond L. Chambers
- Theodore C. Chang
- Joseph J. Chmiel
- Jai Won Choi
- Michael P. Cohen
- Charles S. Davis
- Francis X. Diebold
- William T. M. Dunsmuir
- Trena M. Ezzati-Rice
- Christine A. Franklin
- Dennis C. Gilliland
- Edwin J. Green
- Susan Hinkins
- Joel Lawrence Horowitz
- Fred L. Hulting
- Mohammad F. Huque
- Clifford M. Hurvich
- Parthasarathi Lahiri
- Lisa M. LaVange
- Michael Lavine
- Sik Y. Lee
- Shili Lin
- Amita Manatunga
- Marianthi Markatou
- David A. Marker
- Allan L. McCutcheon
- Kimberly A. McGuigan
- Xiao-Li Meng
- R. Daniel Meyer
- Chand K. Midha
- Janet Myhre
- Mari Palta
- Mark E. Payton
- Mario Peruggia
- Thomas B. Petska
- Robert N. Rodriguez
- Joseph J. Salvo
- Robert L. Santos
- Thomas H. Short
- Eric V. Slud
- Michael A. Stoto
- Dongchu Sun
- Simon Tavaré
- Nancy Temkin
- Terry M. Therneau
- Christopher K. Wikle
- G. David Williamson
- Xiao-Hua Andrew Zhou

=== 2005 ===
- Paul S. Albert
- J. Richard Alldredge
- Eric T. Bradlow
- Janet P. Buckingham
- Jianwen Cai
- Beth Chance
- Ming-Hui Chen
- Smiley W. Cheng
- Merlise A. Clyde
- Kevin J. Coakley
- Dianne Cook
- Susan J. Devlin
- Fred C. Djang
- Francesca Dominici
- Alan H. Dorfman
- Jean-Marie Dufour
- Christopher A. Field
- Andrew P. Grieve
- Frank E. Harrell Jr.
- Xuming He
- Chihiro Hirotsu
- Theodore R. Holford
- Hariharan K. Iyer
- KyungMann Kim
- David G. Kleinbaum
- Robert Jacob Kohn
- Jun S. Liu
- Regina Liu
- Bani K. Mallick
- David J. Marchette
- Michael E. Miller
- Stephan Morgenthaler
- Madhuri Mulekar
- Ralph G. O'Brien
- Byeong U. Park
- William C. Parr
- Jeffrey S. Passel
- Shyamal Peddada
- Michael A. Proschan
- Bonnie Ray
- William F. Rosenberger
- Susan Schechter Bortner
- Iris M. Shimizu
- Patrick E. Shrout
- Jiayang Sun
- Deborah F. Swayne
- Lonnie C. Vance
- Scott A. Vander Wiel
- Jay M. Ver Hoef
- Geert Verbeke
- Joseph S. Verducci
- Patricia Wahl
- Joanne Wendelberger
- Douglas Wiens
- Bin Yu

=== 2006 ===
- Christine Anderson-Cook
- Anthony C. Atkinson
- Stuart G. Baker
- Emery N. Brown
- Ngai-Hang Chan
- Rick Chappell
- Domenic V. Cicchetti
- Gauri S. Datta
- Somnath Datta
- Robyn Dawes
- Virginia A. de Wolf
- Timothy A. DeRouen
- Marie Diener-West
- Kim-Anh Do
- Nader B. Ebrahimi
- Sam Efromovich
- Joseph C. Gardiner
- Marcia Gumpertz
- Bradley A. Hartlaub
- Byron Jones
- Sadanori Konishi
- Michael R. Kosorok
- Paul H. Kvam
- Ta-Hsin Li
- Zhaohai Li
- Steven N. MacEachern
- Donald J. Malec
- Michael A. Martin
- Wendy L. Martinez
- Daniel F. McCaffrey
- Melvin L. Moeschberger
- June Morita
- Tapan K. Nayak
- Jean D. Opsomer
- Sudhir Ranjan Paul
- Daniel Pena
- Nicholas Polson
- Jing Qin
- Nalini Ravishanker
- Deborah J. Rumsey
- Oliver Schabenberger
- Xiaotong Shen
- Lianne Sheppard
- Debajyoti Sinha
- Refik Soyer
- Paul L. Speckman
- F. Michael Speed
- David S. Stoffer
- Robert L. Strawderman
- Jianguo Tony Sun
- Brajendra C. Sutradhar
- David M. Thissen
- David A. Van Dyk
- Marina Vannucci
- Sylvan Wallenstein
- Yazhen Wang
- Yuedong Wang
- Jon A. Wellner
- Hongyu Zhao

=== 2007 ===
- Odd Aalen
- John L. Adams
- David B. Allison
- Mick P. Couper
- Lester R. Curtin
- Michael J. Daniels
- Charmaine Dean
- John J. Deely
- Rebecca Doerge
- David Draper
- David Dunson
- Scott S. Emerson
- Ziding Feng
- Linda Gage
- Marc G. Genton
- Mary W. Gray
- Patrick J. Heagerty
- Glenn M. Heller
- Nicolas Hengartner
- Joseph Hilbe
- Jacqueline Hughes-Oliver
- Jiming Jiang
- Michael I. Jordan
- David R. Judkins
- Samuel Kou
- Way Kuo
- Edward Lakatos
- Joseph B. Lang
- Chuanhai Liu
- Jye-Chyi Lu
- Robert B. Lund
- Elizabeth Margosches
- Sati Mazumdar
- Ian W. McKeague
- Leyla Mohadjer
- Katherine Monti
- Michael A. Newton
- Barry D. Nussbaum
- Walter W. Offen
- Mohsen Pourahmadi
- Allen L. Schirm
- Stuart Scott
- Yu Shen
- Joanna H. Shih
- Elizabeth H. Slate
- Jeffrey L. Solka
- Zachary G. Stoumbos
- Thérèse Stukel
- Ming T. Tan
- Antony Unwin
- Jon C. Wakefield
- Russell D. Wolfinger
- Weng Kee Wong
- Yannis G. Yatracos
- Kai Fun Yu
- Elizabeth R. Zell
- Cun-Hui Zhang
- Ji Zhang
- Li-Xing Zhu

=== 2008 ===
- Yacine Aït-Sahalia
- Gerald J. Beck
- Betsy Becker
- Dulal K. Bhaumik
- Chester E. Bowie
- Subhabrata Chakraborti
- Nilanjan Chatterjee
- Hugh A. Chipman
- Richard J. Cook
- Jill DeMatteis
- Montserrat Fuentes
- Varghese George
- Katherine Halvorsen
- Brian A. Harris-Kojetin
- Steven G. Heeringa
- William G. Henderson
- Thomas Herzog
- Joseph W. Hogan
- Aparna V. Huzurbazar
- Bradley A. Jones
- Henry D. Kahn
- Roger Koenker
- Karol Józef Krótki
- Philip T. Lavin
- Charles E. Lawrence
- Carl Lee
- J. Jack Lee
- Kerry L. Lee
- Hongzhe Li
- Yi Li
- Stacy R. Lindborg
- Thomas M. Loughin
- Ronald E. McRoberts
- Devan V. Mehrotra
- Keith E. Muller
- Daniel S. Nettleton
- Xufeng Niu
- Nancy Obuchowski
- John J. Peterson
- Hui Quan
- Yongzhao Shao
- Eleanor Singer
- David M. Steinberg
- Don L. Stevens Jr.
- Maura Stokes
- Walter W. Stroup
- Brani D. Vidakovic
- Alyson Wilson
- Hulin Wu
- Emmanuel Yashchin
- Dennis L. Young
- Alvan O. Zarate
- Zhao-Bang Zeng

=== 2009 ===
- John M. Abowd
- Ejaz Ahmed
- Sung K. Ahn
- Mohammad Ahsanullah
- Stan Altan
- Naomi Altman
- Jana Asher
- Robert J. Boik
- William P. Butz
- Keumhee Carrière Chough
- Mark Chang
- Jiahua Chen
- Song X. Chen
- Ming-Yen Cheng
- Limin Clegg
- Stephen H. Cohen
- Alex Dmitrienko
- William D. Dupont
- Ronald D. Fricker Jr.
- Edward E. Gbur Jr.
- Sujit Kumar Ghosh
- Robert J. Gray
- Mark Stephen Handcock
- Philip Hougaard
- Feifang Hu
- Jian Huang
- William F. Hunt Jr.
- Rafael A. Irizarry
- David A. James
- Marshall Joffe
- Ian T. Jolliffe
- Nandini Kannan
- Theodore G. Karrison
- John E. Kimmel
- Gary King
- Mani Y. Lakshminarayanan
- Julia Lane
- Herbert K. H. Lee III
- Thomas C. M. Lee
- Michael T. Longnecker
- John E. Orban
- Peihua Qiu
- Domenic J. Reda
- Daniel J. Schaid
- Daniel O. Scharfstein
- Ashis SenGupta
- Gary M. Shapiro
- Christopher A. Sims
- Daniel A. Sorensen
- Tharuvai N. Sriram
- Duane L. Steffey
- Daniel Stram
- Randall David Tobias
- David M. Umbach
- Christopher John Wild
- Rick L. Williams
- Qiwei Yao

=== 2010 ===
- Paul D. Allison
- Dhammika Amaratunga
- Carol Joyce Blumberg
- James J. Colaianne
- Brent Coull
- Robert C. delMas
- Sandrine Dudoit
- Eleanor Feingold
- Subhashis Ghoshal
- Susan Groshen
- Wensheng Guo
- Sudhir Chand Gupta
- Amy H. Herring
- Joan F. Hilton
- Ming-Xiu Hu
- Hsien-Ming James Hung
- Telba Irony
- Daniel R. Jeske
- Andrew Booth Lawson
- Emmanuel M.E.H. Lesaffre
- Virginia Lesser
- Richard A. Levine
- Gang Li
- Tapabrata Maiti
- Adam T. Martinsek
- Laura McKenna
- George Michailidis
- John Francis Monahan
- Motomi Mori
- Christopher H. Morrell
- Jeri Mulrow
- Paul Ross Murrell
- Dayanand N. Naik
- Nagaraj K. Neerchal
- George Ostrouchov
- Omer Ozturk
- J. Lynn Palmer
- Wei Pan
- Sung H. Park
- Moshe Pollak
- John S. Preisser Jr.
- Annie Qu
- Fabrizio Ruggeri
- Estelle Russek-Cohen
- Carolyn M. Rutter
- Bruno Sansó
- Nora Cate Schaeffer
- Christopher H. Schmid
- Nagambal Shah
- Yu Shyr
- Brian L. Wiens
- Rongling Wu
- Haibo Zhou

=== 2011 ===
- Keith A. Baggerly
- Kenneth A. Bollen
- Tim P. Bollerslev
- Robert Francis Bordley
- Connie M. Borror
- Tianxi Cai
- Joseph C. Cappelleri
- Ivan S.F. Chan
- James J. Cochran
- Bruce A. Craig
- Michael R. Elliott
- Brenda L. Gaydos
- Amanda L. Golbeck
- Paul A. Gustafson
- J. Michael Hardin
- Dominique Haughton
- David M. Higdon
- Susan G. Hilsenbeck
- Alan David Hutson
- J. T. Gene Hwang
- Patricia Jacobs
- Zhezhen Jin
- Grace E. Kissling
- Eric Kolaczyk
- Kalimuthu Krishnamoorthy
- Anthony Y. C. Kuk
- Kenneth L. Lange
- Peter J. Lenk
- Runze Li
- Faming Liang
- John C. Liechty
- Aiyi Liu
- Ying Lu
- Esfandiar Maasoumi
- Ranjan Maitra
- Matthew Stuart Mayo
- Jeffrey S. Morris
- Christopher Nachtsheim
- Deborah A. Nolan
- Dimitris N. Politis
- J. Sunil Rao
- Jerome P. Reiter
- Charles J. Rothwell
- Venkatraman E. Seshan
- Thomas A. Severini
- Arvind K. Shah
- Lori Thombs
- Paul A. Tobias
- Júlia Volaufová
- Sue-Jane Wang
- Michel Wedel
- Herbert I. Weisberg
- Robert G. Wilkinson
- Fred A. Wright
- Min-Ge Xie
- Lijian Yang
- Donglin Zeng
- Hongtu Zhu

=== 2012 ===
- Mousumi Banerjee
- Sudipto Banerjee
- Melissa Begg
- DuBois Bowman
- Amy Braverman
- N. Rao Chaganty
- Dongseok Choi
- Mark R. Conaway
- Susmita Datta
- Marc N. Elliott
- Scott R. Evans
- Debashis Ghosh
- Mithat Gonen
- Robert L. Gould
- Deborah H. Griffin
- Jeffrey H. Hooper
- Nicholas J. Horton
- Joan Hu
- Michael G. Hudgens
- Gareth James
- Jae-Kwang Kim
- Michael D. Larsen
- Lawrence I-Kuei Lin
- Bo Henry Lindqvist
- Jen-Pei Liu
- Thomas Lumley
- Clyde F. Martin
- Nancy Mathiowetz
- Bhramar Mukherjee
- Anna Nevius
- Thomas E. Nichols
- James O'Malley
- R. Todd Ogden
- Liang Peng
- Jose C. Pinheiro
- Christian Robert
- Abdul J. Sankoh
- Sanjay Shete
- Judith D. Singer
- Marc A. Suchard
- Thaddeus Tarpey
- Ram C. Tripathi
- Andrea Troxel
- Roshan Joseph Vengazhiyil
- Colin O. Wu
- Daowen Zhang
- Kelly H. Zou
- Rebecca Zwick

=== 2013 ===
- Keaven M. Anderson
- Michael Baron
- Scott Berry
- William A. Brenneman
- Zongwu Cai
- Patrick J. Cantwell
- Ralph B. D'Agostino Jr.
- Timothy P. Davis
- Elizabeth DeLong
- Vladimir Dragalin
- Josée Dupuis
- Sylvia Esterby
- Christopher Genovese
- William F. Guthrie
- Timothy E. Hanson
- Jennifer A. Hoeting
- Jianhua Huang
- Sin-Ho Jung
- Mel Kollander
- Youngjo Lee
- Julie Legler
- Brian G. Leroux
- William Li
- Hua Liang
- Stuart Lipsitz
- Qing Liu
- Yufeng Liu
- Richard A. Lockhart
- J. Scott Long
- Wendy Lou
- Thomas E. Love
- Shuangge Ma
- Craig H. Mallinckrodt
- Madhuchhanda Mazumdar
- Lisa McShane
- Fabrizia Mealli
- Alfredo Navarro
- Susan Paddock
- Ruth Pfeiffer
- Polly Phipps
- Wolfgang Polonik
- Raquel Prado
- Yili Lu Pritchett
- Dabeeru C. Rao
- C. Shane Reese
- Greg Ridgeway
- Matilde Sanchez-Kam
- Douglas E. Schaubel
- Ananda Sen
- Janet Sinsheimer
- Dylan S. Small
- Yanqing Sun
- Mahlet Tadesse
- Ingrid Van Keilegom
- Ronghui Xu
- Guosheng Yin
- Hao Zhang
- Tong Zhang
- Ji Zhu

=== 2014 ===
- Deepak Kr Agarwal
- Patrick Ball
- Sanjib Basu
- Nancy Bates
- Johnny Blair
- Brian Scott Caffo
- Kate Calder
- Joseph E. Cavanaugh
- Aloka G. Chakravarty
- Jie Chen
- Ying Kuen Ken Cheung
- Jeng-Min Chiou
- Bertrand S. Clarke
- Ciprian M. Crainiceanu
- Holger Dette
- Ronald Does
- Lynn Eberly
- Paul Embrechts
- A. Richard Entsuah
- Kiya Famoye
- Paul Gallo
- Martha M. Gardner
- Yulia Gel
- Peter B. Gilbert
- Mark Glickman
- Heike Hofmann
- Scott H. Holan
- Shelley Hurwitz
- Lurdes Inoue
- Qi Jiang
- Amarjot Kaur
- Harry J. Khamis
- Mimi Kim
- Frauke Kreuter
- K. B. Kulasekera
- Purushottam W. Laud
- Nicole Lazar
- Robert H. Lyles
- Leslie M. Moore
- Edward J. Mulrow
- Bin Nan
- Eva Petkova
- Bill Pikounis
- Sophia Rabe-Hesketh
- Shesh N. Rai
- Timothy J. Robinson
- Philip R. Scinto
- Larry Z. Shen
- Pedro Luis Do Nascimento Silva
- Philip B. Stark
- Stefan H. Steiner
- Elizabeth A. Stuart
- Joshua M. Tebbs
- Naitee Ting
- Tor D. Tosteson
- David C. Trindade
- Tyler John VanderWeele
- Melanie Wall
- Hansheng Wang
- Changbao Wu
- Lilly Yue
- Xiaohua Douglas Zhang
- Tian Zheng

=== 2015 ===
- Chul W. Ahn
- Girish A. Aras
- John Aston
- Subhash C. Bagui
- Raymond P. Bain
- Peter M. Bentler
- Bruce Steven Binkowitz
- Erin Blankenship
- Ornulf Borgan
- Frank Bretz
- Eric K. Chicken
- Kennon R. Copeland
- Jill Dever
- Vanja Dukic
- Michael D. Escobar
- Duncan K. H. Fong
- Andrzej T. Galecki
- Daniel A. Griffith
- Yongtao Guan
- Susan Halabi
- John J. Hanfelt
- Jo Hardin
- Ofer Harel
- David R. Hunter
- Linda A. Jacobsen
- Timothy D. Johnson
- Timothy P. Johnson
- Mary Kwasny
- Mary Beth Landrum
- Jodi Lapidus
- Yoonkyung Lee
- James D. Leeper
- Bing Li
- Gang Li
- Peter V. Miller
- John P. Morgan
- Daniel John Nordman
- Art B. Owen
- Frank J. Potter
- Fernando A. Quintana
- Paul Rathouz
- Daniel B. Rowe
- Mary D. Sammel
- Richard Samworth
- Jaya Satagopan
- Haipeng Shen
- Karan P. Singh
- Robert D. Small
- Victor Solo
- Catherine Sugar
- Fengzhu Sun
- Juergen Symanzik
- Peter F. Thall
- Abdus S. Wahed
- Ying Wei
- Hadley Wickham
- Brian J. Williams
- Diane K. Willimack
- Keying Ye
- Grace Y. Yi
- Hao Helen Zhang
- Jun Zhu

=== 2016 ===
- Alexander Aue
- Peter C. Austin
- Veera Baladandayuthapani
- Anirban Basu
- Paul C. Beatty
- Scarlett Bellamy
- Christopher R. Bilder
- Jonaki Bose
- Karl W. Broman
- Peter Bühlmann
- Wenyaw Chan
- Cathy Woan-Shu Chen
- Cong Chen
- Ding-Geng Chen
- Joshua Chen
- Francesca Chiaromonte
- William F. Christensen
- Haitao Chu
- Christopher S. Coffey
- Peter Craigmile
- Jeffrey D. Dawson
- Wayne DeSarbo
- Ruth Etzioni
- Robert Gentleman
- Bonnie Ghosh-Dastidar
- Daniel L. Gillen
- Jan Hannig
- Murali Haran
- Rachel M. Harter
- David Haziza
- Hsin-Cheng Huang
- Yijian Huang
- Terry Hyslop
- Tim Jacobbe
- Barry W. Johnson Jr.
- Galin L. Jones
- Barry P. Katz
- Elizabeth J. Kelly
- Ruth Ann Killion
- Elizaveta Levina
- Martin A. Lindquist
- Qi Long
- Theodore C. Lystig
- Charles F. Manski
- Joel E. Michalek
- Renee H. Miller
- Hon Keung Tony Ng
- Hernando C. Ombao
- Van L. Parsons
- Limin Peng
- Gene Anthony Pennello
- Luis Raul Pericchi
- Karen L. Price
- Naomi B. Robbins
- Ingo Ruczinski
- V. A. Samaranayake
- Juned Siddique
- Michael D. Sinclair
- John W. Staudenmayer
- Rochelle E. Tractenberg
- Yuanjia Wang
- H. Amy Xia
- Xiaonan Xue
- Ann Zauber
- Chunming Zhang

=== 2017 ===
- Saonli Basu
- Sam Behseta
- Kiros Berhane
- James A. Bolognese
- Howard D. Bondell
- Trent D. Buskirk
- Brenda J. Crowe
- Mariza de Andrade
- Rebecca DerSimonian
- Michelle C. Dunn
- Debbie Dupuis
- William B. Fairley
- Rongwei Fu
- Cathy Furlong
- Byron Jon Gajewski
- E. Olusegun George
- Tilmann Gneiting
- Joe Fred Gonzalez Jr.
- Sat N. Gupta
- Charles B. Hall
- Toshimitsu Hamasaki
- Kenneth R. Hess
- Tim Hesterberg
- Mevin B. Hooten
- Li Hsu
- Xuelin Huang
- Xiaoming Huo
- Snehalata V. Huzurbazar
- Ron S. Jarmin
- Jong-Hyeon Jeong
- Eileen King
- Thomas R. Krenzke
- Shonda Kuiper
- Christian Léger
- Lexin Li
- Guanghan Frank Liu
- Wenbin Lu
- Ping Ma
- Yanyuan Ma
- Olga V. Marchenko
- Michael P. McDermott
- Sandeep Menon
- Jason H. Moore
- Reneé H. Moore
- Jennifer D. Parker
- Roger Peng
- Victor Pérez-Abreu
- Michael A. Posner
- Cavan Reilly
- Steven E. Rigdon
- Anindya Roy
- Paola Sebastiani
- Rajeshwari Sridhara
- Anuj Srivastava
- Arnold J. Stromberg
- Wei Sun
- Katherine J. Thompson
- Daniell S. Toth
- George Tseng
- Fugee Tsung
- Jun Yan
- Ying Yuan

=== 2018 ===
- Todd A. Alonzo
- Dipankar Bandyopadhyay
- Moulinath Banerjee
- William C. Bridges Jr.
- Ying Qing Chen
- Yuguo Chen
- Peter Chien
- James M. Curran
- Nairanjana Dasgupta
- Michael E. Davern
- Aurore Delaigle
- Michael Friendly
- Ying Guo
- Weili He
- Peter David Hoff
- Chiung-Yu Huang
- Donsig Jang
- Bing-Yi Jing
- Michael W. Kattan
- Christina Kendziorski
- Jae Kyun Lee
- Ji-Hyun Lee
- Roger J. Lewis
- Mingyao Li
- Ilya A. Lipkovich
- Lei Liu
- Mengling Liu
- Brian D. Marx
- Leslie McClure
- Michael J. Messner
- Diana Miglioretti
- Brian A. Millen
- Kristen Olson
- Taesung Park
- Dionne Price
- James O. Ramsay
- Kenneth M. Rice
- Paul J. Roback
- Milo Schield
- Carl James Schwarz
- Wei Shen
- Bryan Shepherd
- Richard S. Sigman
- Steven J. Skates
- Aleksandra Slavković
- Peter X. Song
- Maya Sternberg
- Zhiqiang Tan
- Boxin Tang
- Nathan Tintle
- Jung-Ying Tzeng
- Huixia Judy Wang
- Lan Wang
- William W. Wang
- Yichao Wu
- Sharon Xiangwen Xie
- Fang Yao
- Yan Yu
- Ying Zhang
- Zhengjun Zhang
- Zhiwei Zhang

=== 2019 ===
- Daniel W. Apley
- Huiman X. Barnhart
- Derek R. Bingham
- Babette Brumback
- Ann R. Cannon
- Hua-Hua Chang
- Jinbo Chen
- Gerda Claeskens
- Keith N. Crank
- Kate M. Crespi
- Yingying Fan
- Michael P. Fay
- Haoda Fu
- Mulugeta Gebregziabher
- Michele Guindani
- Sebastien J-P. A. Haneuse
- Alexandra L. Hanlon
- Miguel A. Hernan
- Craig A. Hill
- Jianhua Hu
- Rebecca Hubbard
- Peter B. Imrey
- Hongkai Ji
- Jiashun Jin
- Katerina Kechris
- Charles L. Kooperberg
- Eric Laber
- Michael Leo LeBlanc
- Bo Li
- Jia Li
- Yehua Li
- Jeff D. Maca
- Nandita Mitra
- Samuel Mueller
- Lei Nie
- Davy Paindaveine
- Eun Sug Park
- Judea Pearl
- Igor Pruenster
- Brian James Reich
- Jason A. Roy
- Cynthia Rudin
- Joseph L. Schafer
- Jonathan Scott Schildcrout
- John Scott
- J. Michael Shaughnessy
- David A. Stephens
- Tim B. Swartz
- Sally Thurston
- Alexander Tsodikov
- Pei Wang
- William J. Welch
- David Woods
- Min Yang
- Xiangrong Yin
- Menggang Yu
- Lanju Zhang
- Mu Zhu
- Hui Zou

=== 2020 ===
- Edoardo Airoldi
- Garnet Anderson
- Rebecca Andridge
- Mine Çetinkaya-Rundel
- Kwun Chuen Gary Chan
- Chung-Chou H. Chang
- Fang Chen
- Yong Chen
- William Scott Clark
- Manisha Desai
- Felicity Boyd Enders
- Robert Brandon Gramacy
- Erica Groshen
- Matthew James Gurka
- Jaroslaw Harezlak
- Guido Imbens
- Anastasia Ivanova
- Yuan Ji
- Laura Lee Johnson
- Pandurang M. Kulkarni
- Hollylynne Lee
- Jeffrey T. Leek
- Sergei Leonov
- Jialiang Li
- Liang Li
- Qizhai Li
- Jason Jinzhong Liao
- Ching-Ti Liu
- Lisa Lix
- Sheng Luo
- Jinchi Lv
- Louis T. Mariano
- Rochelle Martinez
- Kary Myers
- Jennifer Clark Nelson
- Robert Alan Oster
- Mark C. Otto
- Yongming Qu
- Sarah J. Ratcliffe
- Sherri Rose
- Michael Rosenblum
- Kenneth J. Ryan
- Brisa Sánchez
- Alexandra M. Schmidt
- Matthias Schonlau
- Damla Şentürk
- Xiaofeng Shao
- Pamela A. Shaw
- Yiyuan She
- Rajeshwari Sundaram
- Lehana Thabane
- Haonan Wang
- Daniela Witten
- Víctor J. Yohai
- Kai Yu
- Zhengyuan Zhu
- Richard Conrad Zink

=== 2021 ===
- Walter T. Ambrosius
- Kellie Archer
- Vipin Arora
- Amit Bhattacharyya
- Julia Bienias
- Jeffrey D. Blume
- Thomas M. Braun
- Jie Chen
- Zhen Chen
- Jing Cheng
- Victor De Oliveira
- Stephanie Eckman
- Elena Erosheva
- Melody Goodman
- Amelia Haviland
- Matthew J. Hayat
- Martin Ho
- Li-Shan Huang
- Kathi Irvine
- Mikyoung Jun
- Jian Kang
- Stanislav Kolenikov
- Earl C. Lawrence
- Yan Li
- Fang Liu
- Bo Lu
- Pamela D. McGovern
- Weiwen Miao
- David Ian Ohlssen
- Steve Pierson
- Sowmya R. Rao
- Jasjeet S. Sekhon
- Kimberly Sellers
- Ramalingam Shanmugam
- Russell Shinohara
- Rui Song
- Lisa M. Sullivan
- Eric Alan Vance
- Olga Vitek
- Lily Wang
- Xiao Wang
- Xiaofei Wang
- Mark Daniel Ward
- James G. Wendelberger
- Hongquan Xu
- Hongmei Zhang
- Yichuan Zhao
- Yingye Zheng

=== 2022 ===
- Genevera Allen
- Emma Benn
- Veronica J. Berrocal
- Carol Bigelow
- Kun Chen
- Lakshminarayan K. Choudur
- Radu V. Craiu
- Yuehua Cui
- Yang Feng
- Misrak Gezmu
- Beth Ann Griffin
- Stephen W. Gulyas
- Christopher M. Hans
- Steve Horvath
- Haiyan Huang
- Wei-Ting Hwang
- Douglas Landsittel
- Mark S. Levenson
- Fan Li
- Elizabeth Mannshardt
- Kelly McConville
- Tucker S. McElroy
- Christopher Steven McMahan
- Knashawn H. Morales
- Steven J. Novick
- R. Wayne Oldford
- Jamis Jon Perrett
- Megan Price
- Abel Rodriguez
- Satrajit Roychoudhury
- Stephan R. Sain
- Claude Messan Setodji
- Babak Shahbaba
- Julia Sharp
- Ali Shojaie
- Susan Shortreed
- Sean Lorenzo Simpson
- Lu Tian
- Theresa Utlaut
- Peng Wei
- Brady West
- Michael C. Wu
- Xian-Jin Xie
- Eric Xing
- Xinyi Xu
- Wenxuan Zhong
- Jianhui Zhou
- Jose Zubizarreta

=== 2023 ===
- Tony B. An
- Marcus Berzofsky
- Erica Brittain
- Nichole E. Carlson
- Matias D. Cattaneo
- Debbie Cheng
- Jason T. Connor
- Daniel S. Cooley
- Xinping Cui
- Adrian Dobra
- David J. Edwards
- Wenjiang Fu
- Margaret Gamalo
- Kalyan Ghosh
- Phyllis A. Gimotty
- Emily H. Griffith
- Samuel Christopher Haffer
- Tailen Hsing
- Zonghui Hu
- Bo Huang
- Jing Huang
- Booil Jo
- William Evan Johnson
- Daniel T. Kaplan
- Sündüz Keleş
- Joseph Koopmeiners
- Robert Todd Krafty
- Shujie Ma
- Himel Mallick
- Tyler Harris McCormick
- Yajun Mei
- XuanLong Nguyen
- Jing Ning
- Layla Parast
- Marianna Pensky
- Inna T. Perevozskaya
- Robert W. Platt
- Nancy Potok
- Chad M. Schafer
- Deo Kumar Srivastave
- Alisa Stephens-Shields
- Kert Viele
- Lu Wang
- Xiaofeng Wang
- Daniel L. Weiner
- Lingzhou Xue
- Corwin M. Zigler

=== 2024 ===
- Arne C. Bathke
- Claire McKay Bowen
- Hongyuan Cao
- Howard Chang
- Yu Cheng
- Tirthankar Dasgupta
- Guoqing Diao
- Lori E. Dodd
- Morgan Earp
- Birol Emir
- David Fardo
- Andrew O. Finley
- Konstantinos Fokianos
- Andrea S. Foulkes
- Tanya P. Garcia
- Samiran Ghosh
- Jeff Goldsmith
- Douglas D. Gunzler
- Alan Hartford
- Yulei He
- Megan D. Higgs
- Ying Hung
- Matthias Katzfuss
- Luke Keele
- Linglong Kong
- John Kornak
- Ana Kupresanin
- Jing Lei
- Ming Li
- Ruixiao Lu
- Li Ma
- Lester Mackey
- David S. Matteson
- Mark Rothmann
- Huiyan Sang
- Michelle Shardell
- Lili Tian
- Elizabeth Tipton
- Roger Vaughan
- Sherry Wang
- Yuhong Yang
- Weixin Yao
- Jingjing Ye
- Fei Ye
- Recai M. Yucel
- Min Zhang
- Hua Zhou

=== 2025 ===
- Le Bao
- Benjamin Strong Baumer
- Robert A. Beckman
- Jacob Bien
- Jing Cao
- Stefano Castruccio
- Xi Chen
- Freda Cooner
- David B. Dahl
- Abhirup Datta
- Ying Ding
- Andreea Erciulescu
- Yixin Fang
- Laura J. Freeman
- Malka Gorfine
- Jeffrey M. Gonzalez
- Simone Gray
- Ben Hansen
- Michael Brewster Hawes
- Stephanie Hicks
- Sally Ann Hunsberger
- Hormuzd A. Katki
- Lawrence Lesser
- Jianchang Lin
- Cynthia R. Long
- Yan Ma
- Christopher Malone
- Erica E. Moodie
- Thomas Brendan Murphy
- Kannan Natarajan
- Amy O'Hara
- Michael L. Pennell
- Michael J. Schell
- Zhenming Shun
- Ana-Maria Staicu
- Ying Sun
- Donatello Telesca
- Jennifer Van Mullekom
- Chenguang Wang
- Brian Phillip Weaver
- Julian Wolfson
- Lan Xue
- Jiajia Zhang
- Emma Zhang
- Kai Zhang
- Xiang Zhou

=== 2026 ===
- Jonathan Bradley
- Lane Burgette
- Snigdhansu Chatterjee
- Sixia Chen
- Andrea Cook
- David Corliss
- Xinwei Deng
- Carolina Franco
- Jennifer L. Green
- Roee Gutman
- Dorit Hammerling
- Lulu Kang
- Theresa Kim
- Dehan Kong
- Judy Xiang Li
- Jingyi Jessica Li
- Benmei Liu
- Jingyi Liu
- Miguel Marino
- Volodymyr Minin
- Lisa Mirel
- Pushpal Mukhopadhyay
- Susan Murray
- Amy Nowacki
- Rebecca Nugent
- Herbert Pang
- Sharina Person
- Eric Rancourt
- Sandra Safo
- Kendra Schmid
- Weijie Su
- Loni Tabb
- Simon Urbanek
- Jo Wick
- Jeffrey Wilson
- Dacheng Xiu
- Gongjun Xu
- Yanxun Xu
- Shu Yang
- Qingzhao Yu
- Binbing Yu
- Hui Zhang
- Anru Zhang
- Jiwei Zhao
- Yingqi Zhao
- Vadim Zipunnikov

== See also ==
- American Statistical Association Founders Award
