= Eileen King =

American biostatistician

Eileen Catherine King (born 1954) is an American biostatistician specializing in the design and analysis of clinical trials. She is a professor in the Department of Pediatrics at the University of Cincinnati, in the Cincinnati Children's Hospital Medical Center.

== Education and career ==
King graduated from Regis College (Massachusetts) in 1976. She earned a master's degree from the University of Wyoming in 1980, and completed a Ph.D. in 1988 at Texas A&M University. Her dissertation, A test for the equality of two regression curves based on kernel smoothers, was supervised by Jeffrey D. Hart and Thomas Wehrly.

She joined the Cincinnati Children's Hospital Medical Center in 2009, after working in drug development for the pharmaceutical industry.

== Recognition ==
King was the 2011 recipient of the H. O. Hartley Award of the Texas A&M University Department of Statistics, given to former students "for distinguished service to the discipline of statistics". She was named a Fellow of the American Statistical Association in 2017.
