= Carol House =

American statistician

Carol C. House is a retired American statistician who worked for many years in the National Agricultural Statistics Service.

== Education and career ==
House studied mathematics as a graduate student at the University of Maryland, College Park. She worked for 34 years in the National Agricultural Statistics Service, beginning in the late 1970s, and becoming chair of its Agricultural Statistics Board and deputy administrator for programs and products. She retired in 2010. After retiring, she came to work part time in the Committee on National Statistics of the National Academy of Sciences. There, she became a senior program officer, and study director for studies including Measuring What We Spend: Toward a New Consumer Expenditure Survey (2013) and Estimating the Incidence of Rape and Sexual Assault (2014).

== Recognition ==
House was elected as a Fellow of the American Statistical Association in 2003. She is also an elected member of the International Statistical Institute.
