= Elisa T. Lee =

Chinese-American statistician

Elisa T. Lee (born May 1, 1939) is a Chinese-American statistician, affiliated with the University of Oklahoma Health Sciences Center, where she is Regents Professor Emeritus, George Lynn Cross Research Professor of Biostatistics and Epidemiology, and director of the Center for American Indian Health Research.

== Biography ==
Lee was born on May 1, 1939, in Yungsing, China. She earned a bachelor's degree from National Taiwan University in 1961, a master's degree from the University of California, Berkeley in 1964, and a PhD from New York University in 1973. She is a naturalized U.S. citizen.

She worked for Bell Laboratories from 1965 to 1971, and then for the University of Texas MD Anderson Cancer Center from 1971 to 1975, before moving to the University of Oklahoma. With John Wang, she is the author of Statistical Methods for Survival Data Analysis (Wiley, 1980; 4th ed., 2013).

She became a fellow of the American Statistical Association in 1996.
