= Marilyn Seastrom =

American statistician

Marilyn M. Seastrom (born 1951, née Miles, also published as Marilyn M. McMillen) is an American statistician specializing in educational statistics. She is the chief statistician at the National Center for Education Statistics.

Seastrom studied biology and sociology as an undergraduate, and went on to earn master's degrees in each. She also has a doctorate in demography and applied social statistics.

She is a Fellow of the American Statistical Association and a Fellow of the American Educational Research Association. In 2016 she was elected chair of the Government Statistics Section of the American Statistical Association.
