= Susan Paddock =

American statistician

Susan Mary Paddock is an American statistician whose publications have included work on nonparametric Bayesian inference, substance abuse, and the safety of autonomous vehicles.

Paddock is a graduate of the University of Minnesota and has a Ph.D. from Duke University. Her 1999 doctoral dissertation, Randomized Polya Trees: Bayesian Nonparametrics for Multivariate Data Analysis, was supervised by Mike West. Formerly head of the RAND Statistics Group at the RAND Corporation, she moved to NORC at the University of Chicago in 2019 as chief statistician and executive vice president.

She was named a Fellow of the American Statistical Association in 2013, and in the same year won the Mid-Career Achievement Award of the American Statistical Association's Health Policy Statistics Section. She was the 2019 chair of the association's Section on Bayesian Statistical Science.
