= Carolyn Morgan =

American statistician

Carolyn Bradshaw Morgan is an American statistician and applied mathematician, one of the first African-American undergraduates at Vanderbilt University, and the former chair of the mathematics department at Hampton University.

== Education and career ==
Morgan was born in Winston-Salem, North Carolina, the oldest of three children of a single mother. She grew up going to segregated schools, but with integrated Advanced Placement classes and summer programs; she was her high school valedictorian. She became a student at Vanderbilt University, supported by a Rockefeller Scholarship. She majored in mathematics, and graduated in 1969 with her future husband, chemical engineer Morris Morgan. Both were among the eight African-American undergraduate students first admitted when Vanderbilt desegregated in the mid-1960s.

Morgan continued for a master's degree in mathematics at Wright State University, and worked as a schoolteacher and as a computer programmer for General Motors before joining the General Electric research and development center in Schenectady, New York in 1973. While there, she completed a Ph.D. in administrative and engineering systems and statistics at Union College in Schenectady in 1982.

She continued to work for GE until 1996, including participation in the development of the GE Profile dishwasher. From 1996 to 2007 she was chair of the mathematics department at Hampton University, a historically black university in Hampton, Virginia, and continued afterwards as a professor of mathematics there.

== Recognition ==
Morgan is a Fellow of the American Statistical Association, elected to the 1995 class of fellows.
