= Huixia Judy Wang =

Statistician

Huixia Judy Wang is a statistician who works as a professor of statistics at George Washington University. Topics in her research include quantile regression and the application of biostatistics to cancer.

== Education and career ==
Wang graduated from Fudan University in 1999 and earned a master's degree from Fudan in 2002. She completed her Ph.D. in statistics in 2006 from the University of Illinois at Urbana–Champaign. Her dissertation, Inference on Quantile Regression for Mixed Models with Applications to GeneChip Data, was supervised by Xuming He. She joined the statistics faculty at North Carolina State University in 2006 and moved to George Washington University in 2014. From 2018, she has been serving as program director for the Statistics Program at the National Science Foundation.

== Recognition ==
In 2012, the Institute of Mathematical Statistics gave Wang their Tweedie New Researcher Award. In 2018, Wang was elected as a Fellow of the American Statistical Association and of the Institute of Mathematical Statistics (IMS), "for fundamental and influential contributions to the theory and methodology of quantile regression, high dimensional inference and extreme value theory; for outstanding services to the community". She has been awarded an IMS Medallion Lectureship in 2022.
