= Virginia Thompson Holran =

American statistician

Virginia Thompson Holran (April 13, 1913 – July 1980) was an American statistician who became director of statistics and research for the Institute of Life Insurance in 1944. There, she was also the editor for the annual Life Insurance Fact Book.

In 1964 she was elected as a Fellow of the American Statistical Association for "services to the American Statistical Association, especially for the development of corporate memberships".

In her retirement in the 1960s and 1970s she served on the board of education of Bridgeport, Connecticut.
