= Linda A. Jacobsen =

American demographer

Linda Alane Jacobsen is an American demographer, and a senior fellow at the Population Reference Bureau.

== Education and career ==
Jacobsen majored in sociology as an undergraduate at Reed College. She continued her studies in sociology at the University of Wisconsin–Madison, from which she received a master's degree and Ph.D. Her 1985 doctoral dissertation was Women's education, occupational training, and work experience: Patterns, determinants and returns.

She became a faculty member at Cornell University and the University of Iowa before leaving academia to work for American Demographics magazine and in the marketing industry. She became vice president of US programs at the Population Reference Bureau in 2005, and stepped down to become a senior fellow in 2022.

== Recognition ==
Jacobsen was named as a Fellow of the American Statistical Association in 2015.
