= Sherry Wang =

Chinese-American statistician

Xinlei (Sherry) Wang is a Chinese and American statistician, the Jenkins-Garrett Professor of Statistics and Data Science at the University of Texas at Arlington. Her research has applied Bayesian statistics and machine learning to applications including computer security and genomics.

== Education and career ==
Wang studied control theory as an undergraduate at the University of Science and Technology of China, graduating in 1997. After a 1998 master's degree in statistics at the University of Pittsburgh, she completed a Ph.D. in decision science and statistics at the University of Texas at Austin. Her doctoral dissertation, Bayesian Variable Selection for Generalized Linear Models, was supervised by Edward I. George.

She became an assistant professor of statistical science at Southern Methodist University in 2003. She was promoted to associate professor in 2009 and full professor in 2015. In 2023, she moved to University of Texas at Arlington as Jenkins-Garrett Professor in the department of mathematics, and founding director of the Center for Data Science Research and Education. In 2024, the university's College of Science founded a Division of Data Science and she became its director of research.

== Recognition ==
Wang was named as a Fellow of the American Statistical Association in 2024.
