= Martin A. Lindquist =

Swedish-american Biostatistician

Martin A Lindquist
- Education: Rutgers University (PhD, 2001)
- Awards: OHBM Education in Neuroimaging Award
- Scientific career
- Fields: Biostatistics, Neuroscience
- Workplaces: Johns Hopkins University
- Thesis: Fast Functional MRI Using Two-Dimensional Prolate Spheroidal Wavefunctions (2001)
- Doctoral advisors: Lawrence Shepp and Cun-Hui Zhang

Martin A. Lindquist is a statistician and biostatistician whose work focuses on functional magnetic resonance imaging (fMRI), neuroimaging methodology, brain connectivity, causal inference, and pain neuroscience. He is a professor in the Department of Biostatistics at the Johns Hopkins Bloomberg School of Public Health. His research has included statistical modeling of the hemodynamic response in fMRI, dynamic functional connectivity, mediation analysis in neuroimaging, and methodological work on reliability, preprocessing, and biomarkers in brain imaging.

== Early life and education ==
Lindquist was born in Stockholm, Sweden. He completed an MSc in engineering physics at the Royal Institute of Technology (KTH) in Stockholm in 1997 and earned a PhD in statistics from Rutgers University in 2001. His doctoral dissertation was titled Fast Functional MRI Using Two-Dimensional Prolate Spheroidal Wavefunctions. His thesis advisors were Lawrence Shepp and Cun-Hui Zhang.

== Career ==
After completing his doctorate, Lindquist was a postdoctoral associate at the Center for Magnetic Resonance Research at the University of Minnesota from 2001 to 2002. He joined Columbia University in 2002 as an assistant professor of statistics and became an associate professor in 2008. In 2012 he moved to Johns Hopkins University as an associate professor of biostatistics, and in 2015 he became a full professor.

== Research ==
Lindquist's published work spans several areas of neuroimaging statistics. His early research included methods for rapid fMRI acquisition and the statistical analysis of high-temporal-resolution imaging data. He later published on hemodynamic response modeling, dynamic functional connectivity, and reliability in neuroimaging research. He has also published on causal inference and mediation analysis for neuroimaging data, including functional causal mediation and high-dimensional mediation models. His more recent work has addressed pain neuroimaging and neuroimaging-based biomarkers. His co-authored publications include work on neurologic signatures of physical pain. He is a principal investigator on the Acute to Chronic Pain Signatures (A2CPS) project, which seeks to identify biomarkers and advance the study of pain.

Lindquist also developed online courses, including Principles of fMRI I, Principles of fMRI II, and The Statistical Analysis of fMRI Data, offered through Coursera, which have reached 100,000 students world-wide.

Together with Tor Wager, he co-authored Principles of fMRI, a low-cost book on fMRI data analysis.

== Honors and awards ==
Lindquist was elected a Fellow of the American Statistical Association in 2016. In 2018 he received the Organization for Human Brain Mapping Education in Neuroimaging Award.

== Selected works ==
- Lindquist, Martin (2008). "The Statistical Analysis of fMRI Data". Statistical Science.
- Lindquist, Martin (2012). "Functional Causal Mediation Analysis with an Application to Brain Connectivity". Journal of the American Statistical Association.
- Wager, Tor; Atlas, Lauren; Lindquist, Martin; Roy, Mathieu; Woo, Choong-Wan; Kross, Ethan (2013). "An fMRI-based Neurologic Signature of Physical Pain". New England Journal of Medicine.
- Lindquist, Martin; Xu, Yuting; Nebel, Mary Beth; Caffo, Brian (2014). "Evaluating Dynamic Bivariate Correlations in Resting-state fMRI: A comparison study and a new approach". NeuroImage.
- Lindquist, Martin; Geuter, Stephan; Wager, Tor; Caffo, Brian (2019). "Modular Preprocessing Pipelines can Reintroduce Artifacts into fMRI Data". Human Brain Mapping.
