= Amelia Haviland =

American statistician

Amelia M. Haviland is an American statistician currently the Anna Loomis McCandless Professor of Statistics and Public Policy at Carnegie Mellon University. She was named a Fellow of the American Statistical Association in 2021.
