= Linda Malone =

American statistician and industrial engineer

Linda Joy Catron Malone (born 1944) is a retired American statistician and industrial engineer, the coauthor of the textbook Statistics in Research: Basic Concepts and Techniques for Research Workers. Topics in her research have included the statistical analysis of simulations, the economics of construction management, and human factors in information security. She is a professor emerita in the Department of Industrial Engineering and Management of the University of Central Florida.

== Education and career ==
Malone majored in mathematics as an undergraduate at Emory and Henry College in Virginia. After a master's degree in mathematics from the University of Tennessee, she went to Virginia Tech for doctoral study in statistics. Her 1975 doctoral dissertation, A New Estimation Procedure for Response Surface Models, was supervised by Raymond H. Myers.

She joined the University of Central Florida as an assistant professor of statistics in 1979, directed the Institute of Statistics there, and became chair of the department of statistics in 1985. By 1997, when she won the university's Excellence in Graduate Teaching award, she was listed as part of the Department of Industrial Engineering.

== Recognition ==
Malone was named as a Fellow of the American Statistical Association in 2002.

== Selected publications ==
- Ostle, Bernard; Malone, Linda C. (1988), Statistics in Research: Basic Concepts and Techniques for Research Workers (4th ed.), Iowa State University Press
- Trocine, L.; Malone, L. C. (2000), "Finding important independent variables through screening designs: a comparison of methods", 2000 Winter Simulation Conference Proceedings, WSC-00, vol. 1, IEEE, pp. 749–754, doi:10.1109/wsc.2000.899789, ISBN 0-7803-6579-8
- Sater Carstens, Deborah; R. Mccauley-Bell, Pamela; C. Malone, Linda; F. Demara, Ronald (2004), "Evaluation of the Human Impact of Password Authentication", Informing Science: The International Journal of an Emerging Transdiscipline, 7, Informing Science Institute: 67–85, doi:10.28945/503
- Serag, Engy; Oloufa, Amr; Malone, Linda; Radwan, Essam (September 2010), "Model for quantifying the impact of change orders on project cost for U.S. roadwork construction", Journal of Construction Engineering and Management, 136 (9): 1015–1027, doi:10.1061/(asce)co.1943-7862.0000206
