= Kary Myers =

American statistician

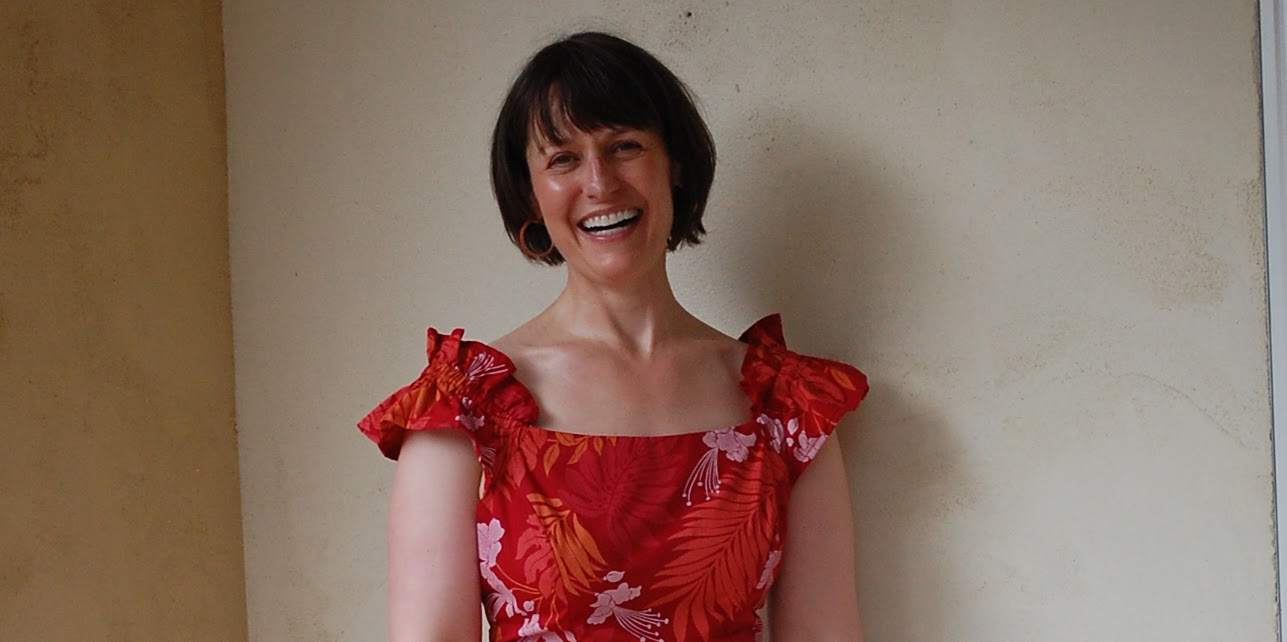
Kary Myers in Santa Fe, New Mexico, 2020

Kary Lynn Myers is an American statistician whose research has included work on scientific data analysis and radiation monitoring. She is a scientist at the Los Alamos National Laboratory, where she has been the deputy leader of the Statistical Sciences group. She is also known as the founder and organizer of the biennial Conference on Data Analysis (CoDA), for data-driven research within the United States Department of Energy.

== Education and career ==
Myers went to high school in Montana, and left high school a year early to start her education at Carnegie Mellon University (CMU). However, she failed out of the mathematics program a year later, and after a return to Montana, began working at CMU as an administrative assistant in the Mellon College of Science. Taking CMU courses part-time through her work as an employee there, she completed a bachelor's degree in statistics, with honors and a minor in computer science, in 1999.

She remained at CMU, where she earned a master's degree in machine learning in 2002, and a Ph.D. in statistics in 2006. Her dissertation, Developing Models to Reveal Brain Activation in Massive Neuroimaging Datasets, was supervised by Bill Eddy. Her undergraduate work in statistics included methods for analyzing data from the Sloan Digital Sky Survey, and her graduate work was supported by a fellowship from AT&T Labs Research and included internships with their artificial intelligence and machine learning departments. She joined Los Alamos directly after completing her doctorate.

== Recognition ==
In 2020, Myers was named a Fellow of the American Statistical Association "for her creative leadership, innovative development and application of statistical methods for high impact collaborations, statistical outreach to the broader scientific community, and outstanding service to the statistics profession".
