= Amy O'Hara =

American data scientist

- Born: American
- Occupation: American data scientist
- Known for: work at Georgetown University as executive director of the university's Federal Statistical Research Data Center, and as a research professor in the Massive Data Institute of the McCourt School of Public Policy

Amy O'Hara is an American data scientist and expert on data management focused on data governance (principles for ensuring the accuracy, availability, and reliability of data), including data privacy and data security. She works at Georgetown University as executive director of the university's Federal Statistical Research Data Center, and as a research professor in the Massive Data Institute of the McCourt School of Public Policy. She is president of the Association of Public Data Users.

== Education and career ==
O'Hara received a bachelor's degree in economics from the SUNY College at Buffalo in 1996, and a master's degree and Ph.D. in economics from the University of Notre Dame, in 1998 and 2003 respectively.

She worked for the United States Census Bureau from 2004 to 2017, becoming chief of its Center for Administrative Records Research and Applications from 2014 to 2017. She spent a year as a senior research scholar at Stanford University in the Stanford Institute for Economic Policy Research, and as associate director for data at the Stanford Center for Population Health Sciences, before moving to Georgetown University in 2018 as a research professor in the Massive Data Institute and as co-director of its U.S. Census Research Data Center.

She was elected as president of the Association of Public Data Users for the 2025–2027 term.

== Recognition ==
O'Hara was elected to the 2025 class of Fellows of the American Statistical Association.
