= Ingrid C. Kildegaard =

American statistician

- Died: September 2, 1984; Haines Falls, New York
- Education: Central Michigan University
- Alma mater: University of Minnesota
- Occupation: Statistician

Ingrid Christensen Kildegaard (died September 2, 1984 in Haines Falls, New York) was an American statistician and market researcher who worked at the Advertising Research Foundation as a vice president and technical director.

== Early life ==
Kildegaard graduated from Central Michigan University (Michigan State Teachers College) in 1936. She did her graduate studies at the University of Minnesota, completing a master's degree in statistics there in 1950.

== Career ==
She joined the Advertising Research Foundation in 1956 and was promoted to director of technical services in 1965. At around that time, she became involved in discussions with the United States Census Bureau over whether they should survey ownership of advanced television sets capable of color and of receiving UHF signals. In 1970 she served as chair of the Subsection on Statistics in Marketing of the American Statistical Association. She retired in 1982.

== Recognition ==
In 1967, she was elected as a Fellow of the American Statistical Association. The Market Research Council added her to their Hall of Fame in 2007.
