= Mahlet Tadesse =

Ethopian-American biostatistician

Mahlet Getachew Tadesse is a biostatistician focused on the use of Bayesian statistics for inferences about high-dimensional data from genomics, including biomarker discovery, the integration of multiple sources of information, the distribution of genomic diversity, and applications in epidemiology. Originally from Ethiopia, she works in the US as a professor at Georgetown University, where she chairs the Department of Mathematics & Statistics.

== Education and career ==
Tadesse is originally from Ethiopia, where she was educated in French-language schools. She began her university studies in France, but then transferred to the University of the District of Columbia and became a mathematics major there. A junior-year biostatistics internship at Harvard University inspired her to continue in biostatistics at the graduate level. She graduated in 1998, and returned to Harvard for graduate study, receiving a master's degree in biostatistics in 2000 and completing a doctorate (Sc.D.) in 2002. Her dissertation, Bayesian Models for Gene Expression Analysis, was supervised by Joseph G. Ibrahim.

After a postdoctoral position as research assistant professor at Texas A&M University from 2002 to 2004, she became an assistant professor of biostatistics and epidemiology at the University of Pennsylvania in 2004. She moved to Georgetown University in 2007 as an assistant professor in the Department of Mathematics; by 2010, when she was promoted to associate professor, it was the Department of Mathematics & Statistics. She was promoted again to full professor in 2016, and has chaired the department for two terms, 2020–2023 and 2024–2027.

== Recognition ==
Tadesse became an Elected Member of the International Statistical Institute in 2006, and a Fellow of the American Statistical Association in 2013. She was Myrto Lefkopoulou Distinguished Lecturer at Harvard University in 2016.
