= Yuanjia Wang =

Chinese-American biostatistician

Yuanjia Wang is a Chinese and American biostatistician whose research focuses on precision medicine for mental health and neurodegenerative disease, including the analysis of biomarkers and behavioral data for risk monitoring, diagnosis, prevention, and treatment. She is a professor at Columbia University, jointly affiliated with Columbia's Department of Biostatistics and Department of Psychiatry, and a member of Columbia's Data Science Institute and of the Division of Mental Health Data Science at the New York State Psychiatric Institute.

== Education and career ==
Wang graduated in 2001 from the University of Science and Technology of China, with the support of a fellowship from the Chinese Academy of Sciences and a double major in computer science and in information management and decision theory. She completed a Ph.D. at Columbia University in 2005. Her doctoral dissertation, Non-Parametric Estimation of Distribution Functions from Kin-Cohort Data, was supervised by Daniel Rabinowitz.

She continued as a postdoctoral researcher at the Columbia University Medical Center, and then joined the Columbia Department of Biostatistics and Department of Psychiatry as an assistant professor in 2006, also becoming a core faculty member in the New York State Psychiatric Institute. She was promoted to associate professor in 2013 and full professor in 2018.

She chaired the Section on Mental Health Statistics of the American Statistical Association (ASA) from 2018 to 2019, and the Health Policy Statistics Section of the ASA from 2021 to 2022.

== Recognition ==
Wang is a Fellow of the American Statistical Association, elected in 2016.
