= Kristen Olson =

American sociologist and statistician

Kristen Marie Olson is an American sociologist and statistician specializing in survey methodology. She is the Leland J. and Dorothy H. Olson Professor of Sociology at the University of Nebraska–Lincoln (UNL) and also directs its Bureau of Sociological Research.

== Education and career ==
Olson graduated in 1999 from Northwestern University, earning a bachelor's degree with honors in mathematical methods in the social sciences. After earning a master's degree in survey methodology in 2003 from the University of Maryland, College Park, she completed a Ph.D. in the same subject in 2007 at the University of Michigan. She joined the faculty at the University of Nebraska–Lincoln in the same year, and was given the Leland J. and Dorothy H. Olson Professorship in 2018. From 2020 to 2024, she served as the co-editor-in-chief of the Journal of Survey Statistics and Methodology.

== Recognition ==
Olson and her co-authors won the best-paper award of the European Survey Research Association in 2015. Olson was elected as a Fellow of the American Statistical Association in 2018 and Fellow of the American Association for the Advancement of Science in 2020. She was elected Council of Sections Representative for the ASA Survey Research Methods program in 2021. She was president of the Midwest Association for Public Opinion Research in 2013–2014 and was named Fellow in 2023. In 2024, the University of Nebraska system presented her with the Outstanding Research and Creative Activity (ORCA) award.
