= Laura J. Freeman =

American statistician

Laura J. Freeman is an American statistician and reliability engineer whose research focuses on quality assurance for statistical and machine learning based decision support systems, especially in military systems and other systems critical for national security. She works at Virginia Tech as director of the Intelligent Systems Division of the Virginia Tech National Security Institute, as deputy director of the Institute, as a research associate professor in the Statistics Department, and as assistant dean of research of the College of Science.

== Education and career ==
Freeman was a student at Virginia Tech. She majored in aerospace engineering, graduating in 2005, received a master's degree in statistics in 2006, and completed her Ph.D. in 2010. Her dissertation, Statistical Methods for Reliability Data from Designed Experiments, was supervised by G. Geoffrey Vining.

From 2010 to 2019 she worked for the Institute for Defense Analyses, becoming assistant director of the Operational Evaluation Division. In 2019 she moved to the Hume Center for National Security and Technology at Virginia Tech as associate director of the Intelligent Systems Lab, becoming director in 2020 and director of the Information Sciences and Analytics Division at the Virginia Tech Applied Research Corporation in 2021, before becoming assistant dean of research, director of the Intelligent Systems Division of the Virginia Tech National Security Institute and, in 2022, deputy director of the institute.

== Recognition ==
Freeman was Virginia Tech's 2009 Graduate Woman of the Year. In 2017 the Institute for Defense Analyses gave her their Andrew J. Goodpaster Award for Excellence in Research. She was the 2019 recipient of the Cross Award of the International Test and Evaluation Association.

She was elected to the 2025 class of Fellows of the American Statistical Association.
