= Patricia Wahl =

American biostatistician

Patricia Walker Wahl is a retired American biostatistician and academic administrator, a professor emerita of biostatistics at the University of Washington, and dean emerita of the University of Washington School of Public Health. Her research has involved multivariate statistics and applications to cardiovascular health.

== Education and career ==
Wahl majored in mathematics at San Jose State University, graduating in 1960, and completed a Ph.D. in biostatistics at the University of Washington in 1971. Her dissertation was Effects of sampling on discriminant functions and their associated error rates for various population configurations.

She was dean of the University of Washington School of Public Health from 1999 to 2010, its first female dean. Under her leadership, the school established a new Department of Global Health, took over the university's degree program in nutritional science, and merged the Department of Pathobiology into the Department of Global Health.

== Recognition ==
Wahl was named a Fellow of the American Statistical Association in 2005, "for outstanding leadership in applications of statistics to the public health field; for substantial statistical contributions to health promotion and disease prevention; and for exemplary teaching and mentoring".
