= Elizabeth A. Martin =

American statistician

- Education: University of Michigan
- Known for: former President of the American Association for Public Opinion Research

Elizabeth A. (Betsy) Martin is a former American statistician and environmental activist, known for bringing principles from cognitive science into survey design, and for improving the ability of the United States census to count homeless people. She is a former president of the American Association for Public Opinion Research.

== Education and career ==
Martin earned a Ph.D. in sociology from the University of Michigan in 1974. She worked for the nonprofit Bureau of Social Science Research in Washington, DC, the National Academy of Sciences, and the University of North Carolina at Chapel Hill before joining the United States Census Bureau as chief of the Center for Survey Methods Research in 1986.

In 1998, Martin stepped down as chief of the center to become a senior survey methodologist. She served as president of the American Association for Public Opinion Research from 2003 to 2004, before retiring in 2007.

During her time at the Census Bureau, Martin evolved questionnaire development and testing by promoting rigorous research, evaluation, and testing, while also consistently championing the comprehensive use of social science methods to improve the quality of data collected in the censuses and surveys.

== Environmental activism ==
In her retirement, Martin studied to become a master naturalist, and became active in the Audubon at Home program in Fairfax County, Virginia, eventually becoming its co-director. She also head the Friends of Little Hunting Creek, a local environmental group connected to Little Hunting Creek in Virginia.

== Recognition ==
Martin won the Department of Commerce Silver Medal in 1997 and was named a Fellow of the American Statistical Association in 1998. She is the 2008 winner of the Roger Herriot Award for Innovation in Federal Statistics of the Washington Statistical Society and the Government Statistics and Social Statistics Sections of the American Statistical Association.
