= Shujie Ma =

Chinese-American statistician

Shujie Ma is a Chinese-American statistician specializing in nonparametric regression and semiparametric regression and their applications in machine learning. She is a professor of statistics at the University of California, Riverside.

== Education and career ==
Ma earned a bachelor's degree in management from Xi'an Jiaotong University in 2004. She went to Michigan State University for graduate study in statistics, earning a master's degree there in 2006 and completing her Ph.D. in 2011. Her dissertation, Theory of Spline Regression with Applications to Time Series, Longitudinal, and Categorical Data, and Data with Jumps, was supervised by Lijian Yang.

She joined the Department of Statistics at the University of California, Riverside as an assistant professor in 2011, earned tenure there as an associate professor in 2017, and was promoted to full professor in 2021.

== Recognition ==
Ma is an Elected Member of the International Statistical Institute, elected in 2012. She was named to the 2022 class of Fellows of the Institute of Mathematical Statistics, for "outstanding contributions to statistical methodology and theory; especially in non-parametric and semi-parametric machine learning methods for massive datasets, and for excellent services to the statistical editorial boards and to the profession". She was elected as a Fellow of the American Statistical Association in 2023.
