= Rebecca Nugent =

American statistician

Rebecca Ann Nugent is an American statistician and data scientist whose research focuses on cluster analysis and statistical classification in data science, the effects of human decision-making in data science, and statistics education. She is Fienberg University Professor of Statistics & Data Science and head of the Statistics & Data Science Department at Carnegie Mellon University.

== Education and career ==
Nugent graduated from Rice University with a triple major in mathematics, statistics, and Spanish, in 1999. After a 2001 master's degree in statistics from Stanford University, she completed her Ph.D. in 2006 at the University of Washington. Her dissertation, Algorithms for Estimating the Cluster Tree of a Density, was supervised by Werner Stuetzle.

She joined Carnegie Mellon University in 2006 as a National Science Foundation VIGRE Postdoctoral Fellow and visiting assistant professor. From 2009–2019 she held teaching positions at CMU as an assistant teaching professor, associate teaching professor, and full teaching professor, and from 2016 to 2019 she was director of undergraduate studies in the Statistics & Data Science Department. In 2019 she was named as the Stephen E. and Joyce Fienberg Professor, and since 2021 she has been the department head. Carnegie Mellon University named her as University Professor in 2026.

She has chaired the Section on Statistics & Data Science Education of the American Statistical Association, and served as president of the International Federation of Classification Societies.

== Recognition ==
Nugent was the 2015 recipient of the Waller Education Award of the American Statistical Association Section on Statistics and Data Science Education. In the same year CMU gave her their William H. and Frances S. Ryan Award for Meritorious Teaching. She was elected as a Fellow of the American Statistical Association in 2026.
