= Almarin Phillips =

American economist

Almarin Phillips (March 13, 1925 in Port Jervis, New York – August 26, 2006 in Bryn Mawr, Pennsylvania) was an American economist specializing in industrial economics and professor emeritus of public policy, economics and law at University of Pennsylvania. Phillips joined the Penn faculty in 1963, teaching economic courses at the Wharton School and antitrust courses at the Law School. Additionally, he served as dean of the former School of Public and Urban Policy in the 1970s, and later chaired the faculty Senate. After retiring in 1991, Phillips served as chairman of the board of Econsult Corp., a Philadelphia economic-consulting firm. After five years, he stepped down as chairman, but continued as an academic affiliate of the firm. Phillips was the author, coauthor, or editor of numerous books and articles. In 1960 he was elected as a Fellow of the American Statistical Association. A decorated World War II veteran, he died of pancreatic cancer in 2006.

He graduated from University of Pennsylvania and Harvard University.
