= Xinping Cui =

Chinese and American biostatistician

Xinping Cui is a biostatistician focusing on metagenomics and associated problems in high-dimensional inference and data analysis including the multiple comparisons problem. Originally from China, she works in the US as a professor of statistics at the University of California, Riverside. She is a former chair of the university's Department of Statistics, and the director of the Riverside Statistical Consulting Collaboratory.

== Education and career ==
Cui graduated from Nankai University in 1994, with a bachelor's degree in mathematics. She earned a master's degree in mathematics from Nankai University in 1997, and a second master's degree in applied statistics from Bowling Green State University in 1998. She went to the University of California, Los Angeles for doctoral study in biostatistics, completing her Ph.D. in 2002. Her dissertation, Quantitative trait linkage analysis of Saccharomyces cerevisiae gene expression data, was supervised by David Elashoff.

While at UCLA, she also worked as a statistical analyst in the UCLA Reed Neurological Research Center. After completing her doctorate, she became an assistant professor at the University of California, Riverside, where she was tenured in 2008. She was chair of the university's Department of Statistics from 2015 to 2021.

== Recognition ==
Cui is an Elected Member of the International Statistical Institute. She was named as a Fellow of the American Statistical Association in 2023.
