= Cristina Parel =

Filipina statistician

- Died: April 10, 2011
- Education: University of the Philippines; University of Michigan
- Scientific career
- Fields: Statistics
- Thesis: A Matrix Derivation of Generalized Least Squares Linear Regression with All Variables Subject to Error

Cristina Perlas Parel (died April 10, 2011) was a Filipina statistician, the first Filipino to earn a doctorate in statistics, the former dean of the Statistical Center at the University of the Philippines, and at the time of her death the only professor emeritus of statistics at the University of the Philippines. She was president of the Philippine Statistical Association in 1966 and 1969, and the first female president of the association.

== Biography ==
Parel earned a B.S.E. from the University of the Philippines. She completed a master's degree in 1949 and a doctorate in 1958 from the University of Michigan; her dissertation, supervised by Paul S. Dwyer, was A Matrix Derivation of Generalized Least Squares Linear Regression with All Variables Subject to Error. She worked at the Statistical Center of the University of the Philippines from 1958 to 1984, and served as dean from 1969 to 1984.

== Honors and awards ==
In 1971, Parel was elected as a Fellow of the American Statistical Association. She was one of five people designated in 1999 as "Pillars of the Philippine Statistical System". She was presented with a plaque of recognition by the Philippine National Statistical Coordination Board in 2007.
