= Nell Sedransk =

American statistician

Nell Sedransk is an American statistician who directed the National Institute of Statistical Sciences (NISS). She continues to work at NISS, and is a research professor of statistics at North Carolina State University. Her research interests include Bayesian inference and experimental design for complex experiments, and includes participation in a study of reading comprehension.

Sedransk earned her Ph.D. from Iowa State University. Her 1969 dissertation was Contributions to discriminant analysis. Before joining the National Institute of Statistical Sciences in 2005, she was a professor of statistics at Case Western Reserve University and then, since 2000, the Chief of the Statistical Engineering Division at the National Institute of Standards and Technology. She directed NISS from 2015 to 2017.

In 2002 she was elected as a Fellow of the American Statistical Association; her husband, Joseph Sedransk, had achieved the same honor in 1981. She is also an elected member of the International Statistical Institute.
