= Matilde Sanchez-Kam =

Filipino and American statistician

Maria Matilde Sanchez-Kam is a Filipino and American statistician specializing in the statistics of clinical trials for drug development.

== Education and career ==
After earning a bachelor's degree from the University of the Philippines Los Baños, Sanchez-Kam continued her studies at Pennsylvania State University, where she received a master's degree in statistics and operations research and a Ph.D. in statistics.

After many years working in the pharmaceutical industry, including working for Merck Research Laboratories as director of clinical biostatistics and research decision science and for Arena Pharmaceuticals as vice president of biostatistics and data management, she joined the Food and Drug Administration in 2018 as associate director of analytics and informatics in the Office of Biostatistics. Subsequently she left the FDA to become a statistical consultant.

== Service and recognition ==
Sanchez-Kam was chair of the biopharmaceutical section of the American Statistical Association in 2014, and vice president of the association beginning in 2021. She has also chaired the association's statistical consulting section and its New Jersey chapter. She was elected as a Fellow of the American Statistical Association in 2013.
