= Tim Hesterberg =

American statistician

Tim Hesterberg is an American statistician. He is a Fellow of the American Statistical Association and currently works as a staff data scientist at Instacart.

== Education and career ==
Tim Hesterberg graduated with a B.A in mathematics from St. Olaf College and received his Ph.D. in statistics from Stanford University. He is a member of the National Institute of Statistical Sciences(NISS) and was previously on the NISS Board of Trustees. He is currently on the board of the Canadian Statistical Sciences Institute. Hesterberg previously worked as a senior statistician at Google as well as at Franklin and Marshall College, Pacific Gas & Electric Co, and Insightful/MathSoft. He is currently a senior statistician at Instacart.

== Research ==
Hesterberg has contributed to statistical research by writing a textbook, articles, and a software package:

- A 2011 undergraduate student textbook titled Mathematical Statistics with Resampling and R.
- A 2015 article titled "What Teachers Should Know About the Bootstrap: Resampling in the Undergraduate Statistics Curriculum".
- A 2015 R (programming language) software package titled 'resample: Resampling Functions'. It performs bootstraps, permutation tests, and other sampling refunctions, and is intended to be easy to use.
- Scientific articles including "Bootstrap", "Least-Angle Regression and LASSO for Large Datasets", and "Least Angle and L1 Penalized Regression: A Review".
