= Sharon Xiangwen Xie =

Sharon Xiangwen Xie is a Chinese biostatistician and epidemiologist who studies neurodegenerative diseases. She is a professor of biostatistics in the Department of Biostatistics, Epidemiology, and Informatics at the University of Pennsylvania.

== Education ==
Xie earned a bachelor's degree in applied mathematics from Beijing University of Technology in 1991. She then attended the University of Texas, where she completed a master's degree in statistics in 1993. After that, she moved to the University of Washington, where she earned a second master's degree in biostatistics in 1995 and a Ph.D. in 1997. Her dissertation, Covariate Measurement Error Methods In Failure Time Regression, was supervised by Ross L. Prentice.

== Career ==
Xie was elected a Fellow of the American Statistical Association in 2018. She serves as program chair for the Biometrics Section of the American Statistical Association at the 2019 Joint Statistical Meetings. In 2021, she was elected secretary of the ASA Lifetime Data Science Section.
