= Jeffrey S. Morris =

American biostatistician

Jeffrey S. Morris is an American Biostatistician. He is the George S. Pepper Professor of Public Health and Preventative Medicine at the Perelman School of Medicine of the University of Pennsylvania.
