= Mimi Kim =

American statistician

Mimi Y. Kim is the Harold and Muriel Block Chair in epidemiology and population health at the Albert Einstein College of Medicine, where she heads the division of biostatistics.

Kim graduated from the University of California, Berkeley with a bachelor's degree in bioengineering in 1986, and completed an Sc.D. in biostatistics at Harvard University in 1990. She joined the New York University School of Medicine in 1990, becoming an assistant professor in 1994 and an associate professor in 2000. She moved to the Albert Einstein College of Medicine in 2003. She was given the Block Professorship in 2013.

In 2014 she was elected as a Fellow of the American Statistical Association "for exemplary leadership of academic biostatistics programs; for extensive collaborative research in HIV/AIDS, cancer, and rheumatology; for innovative study designs and analyses applied to medical research; and for extensive service to the biostatistics profession." She is the president-elect of the Korean International Statistical Society.
