= Cressy L. Wilbur =

Cressy L. Wilbur (March 16, 1865, Hillsdale, Michigan – August 10, 1928, Utica, New York) was a statistician who was Director of Vital Statistics of the New York State Department of Health over the period 1914–1916 and chief statistician in the Federal Census Bureau over the period 1906–1914. He influenced practices of statistical collection in the United States and was described as "one of the leading statisticians of the world".

He graduated with an undergraduate degree from Hillsdale College in 1886, studied medicine at University of Michigan for three years, and received a M.D. from Bellevue Hospital Medical College in 1890. He was Chief of the Division of Vital Statistics of Michigan from 1893 to 1906.

Wilbur was an influential proponent of comprehensive data collection efforts by governments in the United States. He argued,

The history of the registration of vital statistics in the United States has been that of a most valuable and necessary institution of modern society neglected amid more or less pioneer and primitive conditions. There was little thought of making permanent records of individuals in the rapid march of civilization across the continent.

He suffered a breakdown in 1916, from which he never recovered. He died in a sanitarium.

He married Blanche M. Mead in June 1891. They had three children.
