= Sheryl F. Kelsey =

American biostatistician and epidemiologist

Sheryl F. Kelsey (born 1945) is an American biostatistician and epidemiologist who became the first woman to earn a doctorate in statistics from Carnegie Mellon University. She made significant contributions to how heart disease is treated by studying the outcomes of coronary angioplasty.

== Education and career ==
Kelsey was born in Cleveland, Ohio in 1945, and grew up in New Jersey and Iowa. She studied mathematics as an undergraduate, with a minor in chemistry, graduating in 1967 from Mount Holyoke College. She earned her PhD from Carnegie Mellon in 1978, with a dissertation on the air pollution caused by steel mills, supervised by Paul Shaman. She joined the University of Pittsburgh, and remained there until her retirement in 2012.

== Awards and honors ==
She is a fellow of the American Statistical Association, the American Heart Association, and the International Academy of Cardiovascular Sciences. She also chairs the IAIA Foundation of the Institute of American Indian Arts.
