= Patrick L. Brockett =

American business economist

Patrick L. Brockett holds the Gus Wortham Chair in Risk Management and Insurance at The University of Texas at Austin. He is a faculty member in the Information, Risk, and Operations Management, Finance, and Mathematics departments and serves as Director of the Risk Management and Insurance Program and the Center for Risk Management and Insurance. Additionally, he oversees the Minor/Certificate in Risk Management Program and is affiliated with the Division of Statistics & Scientific Computation at the university. His research focuses on statistics, probability, actuarial science, quantitative methods in business and social sciences, and risk and insurance. In recognition of his contributions, the American Risk and Insurance Association (ARIA) established the Patrick Brockett & Arnold Shapiro Actuarial Research Award, which is presented annually to the actuarial journal article that makes a significant contribution to the field of risk management and insurance research.

== Career ==
Patrick Lee Brockett earned a B.A. in mathematics from California State University, Long Beach, and completed his M.A. and Ph.D. in mathematics at the University of California, Irvine, in 1975. He began his academic career teaching mathematics at Tulane University (1975–1977) and later at the University of Texas at Austin (1977–1980). In 1980, he switched to the actuarial science program within the Finance Department at the University of Texas at Austin, where he eventually became program director.

In 1995, Brockett was appointed Director of the Risk Management and Insurance Program, relocating the program to the Department of Management Science and Information Systems, now the Department of Information, Risk, and Operations Management. Throughout his tenure, he also served as Director of the Center for Cybernetic Studies (1990–1996), the Center for Management of Operations and Logistics (1996–1999), and the Center for Risk Management and Insurance (1999–present).

Beyond his academic roles, Brockett contributed to the state of Texas as a board member of the Texas Property and Casualty Guaranty Association from 1999 to March 2020, addressing claims for insolvent insurance companies. He currently serves as Co-Editor of the North American Actuarial Journal after a tenure as Editor-in-Chief (2014–2023). He is also on the editorial board of the Journal of Risk and Financial Management and the board of directors of Incline National Insurance Company.

Brockett has held leadership roles in professional organizations, including serving as President of the American Risk and Insurance Association (2001–2002) and Editor of the Journal of Risk and Insurance (1998–2009).

== Elected Professional Society Elected Fellowships and Honors ==
National Academy of Social Insurance – Elected Member, 2023

The Institute of Strategic Risk Management – Elected Fellow, 2022

The Institute of Risk Management – Elected Fellow, 2008

International Statistical Institute – Elected Member, 2006

American Risk and Insurance Association (ARIA) – Outstanding Achievement Award, 2006

The American Association for the Advancement of Science – Elected Fellow, 1993

The Royal Statistical Society Fellow – Elected Chartered Statistician (#781) by RSS, March 10, 1993

The American Statistical Association – Elected Fellow, 1992

The Institute of Mathematical Statistics – Elected Fellow, 1989

INFORMS (formerly Operations Research Society of America – ORSA) – Elected as "Full Member", prior to merger with the Institute of Management Sciences to form INFORMS

== Research Article Awards and Honors ==
- North American Actuarial Journal Annual Prize for Best Paper, 2018
  - Article: Potential “Savings” of Medicare: The Analysis of Medicare Advantage and Accountable Care Organizations
- Spencer L. Kimball Prize, 2015 (Awarded by the National Association of Insurance Commissioners for best article in the Journal of Insurance Regulation)
  - Article: How to Set Rates if You Must: An Efficiency-Based Methodology for Setting Promulgated Insurance Rates with an Application to Title Insurance
- North American Actuarial Journal Annual Prize for Best Paper, 2016
  - Article: Empirical Evidence on the Use of Credit Scoring for Predicting Insurance Losses with Psycho-Social and Biochemical Explanations
- American Risk and Insurance Association's Excellence in Teaching Award, 2011
  - This award recognizes excellence in risk management and insurance teaching. Applicants have a distinguished record of excellent teaching throughout their academic career. This award is given in years when an exceptional candidate is identified based on a distinguished teaching record
- 8th Most Cited Journal of Risk and Insurance Article, 2009
  - Article: Using Kohonen's self-organizing feature map to uncover automobile bodily injury claims fraud
- Top Ten Most Published Researcher in the World, Journal of Risk and Insurance (75-year history), 2008
  - Article: The Journal of Risk and Insurance: A 75-Year Historical Perspective
- Casualty Actuarial Society Award, 2008 (Awarded for research paper published in the ARIA journal that provides the most valuable contribution to Casualty Actuarial Society)
  - Article: Biological and Psychobehavioral Correlates of Risk Taking, Credit Scores, and Automobile Insurance Losses: Toward an Explication of Why Credit Scoring Works
- Risk Management and Insurance Review Perspectives Award, 2006
  - Article: Weather Derivatives and Weather Risk Management
- Robert C. Witt Research Award, 2005 (Awarded for best feature article in the Journal of Risk and Insurance, based on subject importance and literature contribution)
  - Article: A Comparison of HMO Efficiencies as a Function of Provider Autonomy
- Robert I. Mehr Award, 2004 (Awarded for a journal article making a lasting contribution to risk management, standing the test of time)
  - Article: A Neural Network Method for Obtaining an Early Warning of Insurer Insolvency
- Casualty Actuarial Society Award, 2003
  - Article: Fraud Classification Using Principal Component Analysis of RIDITs
- Casualty Actuarial Society Award, 2001
  - Article: Great (and not so Great) Expectations: An Endogenous Economic Explication of Insurance Cycles and Liability Crises
- International Brian Hey Prize (Second Place), 2000 (Awarded by the Institute and Faculty of Actuaries (IFoA) in the UK)
  - Article: Great (and not so Great) Expectations: An Endogenous Economic Explication of Insurance Cycles and Liability Crises
- David Rist Prize (Finalist), 1999 (The Rist Prize recognizes the practical benefit sound operations research can have on real life decision-making, and recipients have influenced major decisions or practices through excellent, applied analyses and research)
  - Article: Forecasting and Allocation of US Army Recruiting Resources
- North American Actuarial Journal Annual Prize for Best Paper, 1996
  - Article: Actuarial Usage of Grouped Data: An Approach to Incorporating Secondary Data, TSA, Vol. XLVII (1995)
- Franz Edelman Competition (Semi-finalist), 1995 (The Edelman competition attests to the contributions of operations research and analytics in both the profit and non-profit sectors.The purpose of the competition is to bring forward, recognize and reward outstanding examples of operations research, management science, and advanced analytics in practice in the world)
  - Article: Forecasting and Allocation of US Army Recruiting Resources
- International Insurance Society Best Paper Award, 1994
  - Article: Ambiguity, Risk Charges, and Insurance Pricing
- The Halmsted Prize for the Most Outstanding English Language Publication in Actuarial Science in the World, 1991 (Awarded by the Society of Actuaries, this prize recognizes the best paper from major English-language actuarial journals)
  - Article: Information Theoretic Approach to Actuarial Science: A Unification and Extension of Relevant Theory and Applications
- American Statistical Association Award for “Most Outstanding Statistical Application Article Published in any Journal, in any Field, and in any Language”, 1992
  - Article: Information Theoretic Approach to Actuarial Science: A Unification and Extension of Relevant Theory and Applications
- American Risk and Insurance Association's Award for “Outstanding Feature Article”, 1986
  - Article: Information Theoretic Approach to Actuarial Science: A Unification and Extension of Relevant Theory and Applications
- American Risk and Insurance Association's Award for “Outstanding Communication Article” (This Award is given by the American Risk and Insurance Association to the best communication article published in the Journal of Risk and Insurance)
  - Article: Insurance Versus Self-Insurance: A Risk Management Perspective

== University of Texas at Austin Awards and Honors ==
- Fellow, UT Austin Humanities Research Institute
- Outstanding Graduate Teacher Award: UT Austin Graduate School, 1995
- Award for Research Excellence, presented by The University of Texas College of Business Foundation Advisory Council (1984 and 1992)

== Books ==
- Brockett, Patrick L., and A. Levine. 1984. Statistics, Probability and Their Applications, W. B. Saunders Publishing Co., (Reprinted in Japan, by HRW International, 1986).
- Baranoff, Etti G, Patrick Brockett and Yehuda Kahane, Risk Management for the Enterprise and Individuals, Flatworld Knowledge Publisher, Spring 2009. http://www.flatworldknowledge.com/
- Baranoff, Etti, Patrick Brockett, Yehuda Kahane, and Dalit Baranoff (2019) Risk Management for Individuals and Enterprises 2nd Edition, (2019) ISBN 978-1-4533-9206-5 Flatworld Publishers
- Baranoff, Etti, Patrick Brockett, Yehuda Kahane, and Dalit Baranoff (2021) Risk Management for Individuals and Enterprises v2.1, (2021) Discipline: Finance ISBN 978-1-4533-3827-8 Flatworld Publishers (Updated to include Corona impact and risk control)

== Monographs ==
- Aird, Paul, Patrick Brockett, and Robert C. Witt. 1993. An Analysis of Pricing and Availability Problems in the Texas Automobile Insurance Market, National Association of Independent Insurers.
- Brockett, Patrick L. and Patricia Arnold 2004 “Deregulation, Pricing and Availability Issues in the Texas Homeowners Insurance Market” (Fall) 2004 monograph, Texas Public Policy Foundation
- National Research Council of the National Academy of Sciences. Levees and the National Flood Insurance Program: Improving Policies and Practices. Washington, DC: The National Academies Press, 2013 (Brockett was part of National Research Council committee that wrote the monograph)
- National Research Council of the National Academy of Sciences. Affordability of National Flood Insurance Program Premiums -- Report 1, Washington, DC: The National Academies Press, 2014 (Brockett was part of National Research Council committee that wrote the monograph)
- National Research Council of the National Academy of Sciences. Affordability of National Flood Insurance Program Premiums -- Report 2, Washington, DC: The National Academies Press, 2015 (Brockett was part of National Research Council committee that wrote the monograph)
