= Karl Broman =

American biostatistician

Karl Broman is a professor at the University of Wisconsin–Madison (UWM) in the Biostatistics and Medical Informatics departments. He has been employed at UWM since 2007 and previously was employed at Johns Hopkins University from 1999 - 2007. Broman's original research focus was quantitative genetics, although he has also become known for his work on reproducible research. In 2016, Broman was named a Fellow of the American Statistical Association.

== Research ==
=== Study of Bile Acids ===
In 2019 Karl Broman and a group of researchers published a study which found genetic variants in mice that impacted the bile acid levels in their guts.

Broman's other highly cited papers include:

- Broman, Karl W., et al. "Comprehensive human genetic maps: individual and sex-specific variation in recombination." The American Journal of Human Genetics 63.3 (1998): 861–869.
- Broman, Karl W., et al. "R/qtl: QTL mapping in experimental crosses." Bioinformatics 19.7 (2003): 889–890.
- Churchill, Gary A., et al. "The Collaborative Cross, a community resource for the genetic analysis of complex traits." Nature genetics 36.11 (2004): 1133.

== Rstudio ==
Karl Broman created R (programming language) packages such as qtlcharts, QTL, and QTL2. These packages perform trait localization and visualizations of genetic data in high dimensions.
