= Nandini Kannan =

American statistician

- Education: Pennsylvania State University
- Awards: Fellow of the American Association for the Advancement of Science
- Scientific career
- Fields: Mathematics
- Workplaces: Indo-U.S. Science and Technology Forum

Nandini Kannan is the Executive Director at the Indo-U.S. Science and Technology Forum (IUSSTF) and also Dean of Academics & Director of Data Science Institute at Plaksha University.

== Education and career ==
Kannan received her PhD in Statistics from Pennsylvania State University in 1992. Her dissertation, Estimation of Direction of Arrival in Signal Processing Models, was supervised by C. R. Rao.

Kannan spent over 20 years in academia, first as a faculty member and then as Chair, Department of Management Science and Statistics at the University of Texas at San Antonio (UTSA). During her time at UTSA, she helped to develop new undergraduate and graduate programs and led a university-wide initiative on quantitative literacy. Since 2014, Kannan has served as a Program Director at the US National Science Foundation (NSF) where her responsibilities included core disciplinary research, mathematical sciences research institutes, and workforce development programs in the Division of Mathematical Sciences as well as a number of cross-directorate and cross-agency activities. She has served as a co-chair for several Data Science related activities in support of Harnessing the Data Revolution, one of NSF’s 10 Big Ideas. She helped to create new programs to support data science foundations as well as data-intensive research in different science and engineering domains. Kannan also helped to create partnerships with the National Institutes of Health (NIH) to support collaborative efforts in biomedical data science. She serves on the board of trustees of the International Indian Statistical Association (IISA) and is a former President of IISA.

== Awards and honors ==
Kannan was awarded the AAAS Fellows Award in 2019.
