= Corwin M. Zigler =

American statistician

Corwin M. Zigler is an American statistician.

Zigler earned a concurrent Bachelor of Arts and Master of Arts at Boston University in 2005, then completed a PhD in 2010, at the University of California, Los Angeles. He subsequently began teaching at Harvard T.H. Chan School of Public Health. He joined the University of Texas at Austin in 2018, and moved to Brown University in 2024.

Zigler won the Rothman Epidemiology Prize in 2019. In 2023, Zigler was elected a fellow of the American Statistical Association.
