= Mousumi Banerjee =

Indian-American statistician and singer

- Born: India

Academic background
- Education: BS, MS, Statistics, Indian Statistical Institute; PhD, Statistics, 1994, University of Wisconsin
- Thesis: Influence Diagnostics in Longitudinal Models (1994)

Academic work
- Institutions: University of Michigan; Wayne State University
- Website: mousumibanerjee.com

Mousumi Banerjee is an Indian-American statistician and singer. She is the Anant M. Kshirsagar Collegiate Research Professor of Biostatistics and Director of the Center for Healthcare Outcomes and Policy (CHOP) at the University of Michigan. Banerjee is also the executive director of the nonprofit art foundation Tagore Beyond Boundaries.

== Early life and education ==
Banerjee was born and raised in India to academic parents; her father was a professor of English literature and her mother taught Bengali language. Although she was never formally trained music and literature, she learned from her cousins and father how to write poetry and sing. She was convinced by her high school math teacher to study at the Indian Statistical Institute, where she was the only female in a class of 22. Following her Master's degree, Banerjee moved to North American and enrolled at the University of Wisconsin for her PhD in statistics.

== Career ==
Upon completing her PhD, Banerjee accepted a faculty position at Wayne State University where she worked on an National Institutes of Health-funded prostate cancer project. As an associate professor in the Center for Healthcare Effectiveness Research, Banerjee received the Blue Cross Blue Shield of Michigan Foundation Excellence in Clinical Research Award for her project, titled "Recursive Partitioning for Prognostic Grouping of Patients with Clinically Localized Prostate Carcinoma." In order to work cohesively with doctors on her prostate cancer project, Banerjee began taking biology classes and shadowing colleagues in clinics to understand the science.

Banerjee eventually left Wayne State University to accept a faculty position at the University of Michigan where she continued to study cancer In 2007, she led a research project of over 630 women diagnosed with breast cancer which determined that black women were less likely to undergo cancer treatment than white women. In 2012, she was elected a Fellow of the American Statistical Association for her "outstanding and sustained research, collaboration and mentoring involving statistical methods, theory and design for clinical trials, and for service to the profession." Banerjee was also named the director of UMich's Center for Healthcare Outcomes and Policy, during which her project Tree-Based Model for Thyroid Cancer Prognostication received the 2015 Blue Cross Blue Shield Foundation of Michigan McDevitt Excellence in Research Award in the area of health policy research.

While continuing to work at the University of Michigan, Banerjee also co-founded a nonprofit organization with Rajeeb Chakraborty called Tagore Beyond Boundaries. The aim of the nonprofit was to transcribe the songs of Rabindranath Tagore to share with the Western world. She also released two CDs, Hriday Amar Prakash Holo and Nijer Rabindranath, and published one book on poetry. In 2018, Banerjee was appointed the Anant M. Kshirsagar Collegiate Professor for a five-year term in recognition of her "work on statistical methodology that have been applied to many important areas of health care and policy."
