= Beatrice Shube =

Beatrice (Bea) Shube (April 13, 1921 – December 5, 2010) was an American book editor for the statistics series of John Wiley & Sons.

Shube was originally from New York City. She graduated from Brooklyn College in 1941, and retired in 1988.

Both the American Statistical Association and the American Association for the Advancement of Science honored her by electing her as a fellow.
