= Glen Satten =

American statistician

Glen Alan Satten is an American statistician.

Satten earned a Bachelor of Arts from Oberlin College in 1979, followed by a Master of Arts and PhD at Harvard University in 1981 and 1985, respectively. He holds a professorship within Emory University School of Medicine's Department of Gynecology and Obstetrics. In 2003, Satten was elected a fellow of the American Statistical Association.
