= Sharon-Lise Normand =

Canadian biostatistician

- Education: Western University; University of Toronto
- Scientific career
- Workplaces: Harvard T.H. Chan School of Public Health

Sharon-Lise Teresa Normand is a Canadian biostatistician whose research centers on the evaluation of the quality of care provided by physicians and hospitals, and on the health outcomes for medical devices and medical procedures. She is a professor in the Department of Health Care Policy at the Harvard Medical School and in the Department of Biostatistics at the Harvard T.H. Chan School of Public Health.

== Education and career ==
Normand graduated from Western University in Ontario in 1984, with a bachelor's degree in statistics, part of the first cohort of students in Western University's new statistics program. She earned a master's degree at Western University in 1985, and began her graduate studies in another new program, biostatistics at the University of Toronto. She completed her Ph.D. at Toronto in 1990, with a dissertation Some Statistical Applications of Bayesian Networks.

Normand writes that, at this point in her career, she was tempted by early job offers at lower-ranked institutions, but that a faculty mentor advised her that a better position would surely come to her if she waited. The better position did come, in the form of postdoctoral study in the Harvard Medical School. She joined the Harvard Biostatistics faculty in 1992, and added a joint appointment in the Department of Health Care Policy in 1995. Since 2003 she has also been affiliated with the Center for Basic Research in the Social Sciences at Harvard.

== Recognition ==
In 2002 Normand was elected as a Fellow of the American Statistical Association for "influential application of Bayesian methodology to health policy problems, for leadership in the new area of health policy statistics, and for promoting and communicating statistical methods and assessments of the quality of cardiovascular disease and mental illness." In the same year she also became a Fellow of the American College of Cardiology. She became a Fellow of the American Heart Association in 2009, and a distinguished scientist of the American Heart Association in 2012.

She was one of the founders of the American Statistical Association Health Policy Statistics Section, when it was created in 1994, and won the Long Term Excellence Award of the section in 2011. She also won the Distinguished Service Award of the International Society for Pharmacoeconomics and Outcomes Research in 2012, and the L. Adrienne Cupples Award for Excellence in Teaching, Research, and Service in Biostatistics in 2015.
