= Nalini Ravishanker =

Indian-American statistician

Nalini Ravishanker is an Indian-American statistician whose work focuses mainly on time series analysis. She is a professor of statistics at the University of Connecticut. Her interests in methodology and applications of statistics are evident from her large body of work, spreading across various disciplines like finance, insurance, marketing, transportation, reliability, marine science, ecology and environmental science, biomedical sciences, civil engineering, and computer engineering. She has published more than 150 articles in peer reviewed journals, and has published four books.

== Education and Career ==
Ravishanker graduated with a B.Sc in statistics from Presidency College, Chennai (India) where she was awarded the Bysani Chetty gold medal for being the 1st ranked in B.Sc. After her graduation, she moved to the USA to pursue a Ph.D. in statistics from New York University, where she was one of the early recipients of the Paul Willensky Scholarship Award. Immediately after her Ph.D, she was associated with IBM Research, Yorktown Heights as an independent consultant, and later as a visiting scientist.

Ravishanker joined the Department of Statistics at the University of Connecticut in 1989 as a member of Faculty, and she has been there ever since. At the University of Connecticut, she was the undergraduate program director in the statistics department for 25+ years, advising statistics and mathematics-statistics majors and statistics minors. She has also advised and co-advised more than 20 Ph.D students. She has conducted numerous workshops and given lectures on statistics in several universities, institutions, and industries across the globe. Currently, she serves on the Steering Committee for the Masters in Data Science program and teaches in-person and online courses.

Ravishanker is a fellow of the American Statistical Association (ASA), the American Association for the Advancement of Science (AAAS), and an elected member of the International Statistical Institute (ISI). Ravishanker is the President-Elect of the ISI for 2025-2027, with her term as President for 2027-2029. She served as President of the International Society for Business and Industrial Statistics (ISBIS) from 2017 to 2019. She has been on the editorial board of many prestigious journals, was Co-Editor-in-Chief of the International Statistical Review, and is the current Editor-in-Chief of Applied Stochastic Models in Business and Industry (ASMBI) journal.

== Publications ==
=== Books ===
- Ravishanker, N., Raman, B., and Soyer, R. (2022). Dynamic Time Series Models using R-INLA: An Applied Perspective. Chapman & Hall/CRC: New York. ISBN 978-0-367-65427-6 (hbk); ISBN 978-0-367-68062-6 (pbk); ISBN 978-1-003-13403-9 (ebk).
- Ravishanker, N., Chi, Z., and Dey, D. K. (2021). A First Course in Linear Model Theory. Chapman & Hall/CRC: New York, Second edition. ISBN 978-1-439-85805-9 (hbk); ISBN 978-1-032-10139-2 (pbk); ISBN 978-1-315-15665-1 (ebk). Click this link for errata.
- Ravishanker, N. and Dey, D. K. (2001). A First Course in Linear Model Theory. Chapman & Hall/CRC: New York. ISBN 1-58488-247-6. Click this link for errata.
- Davis, R. A., Holan, S. H., Lund, R. and Ravishanker, N. (2016). Handbook of Discrete-Valued Time Series. Chapman & Hall/CRC: New York. ISBN 9781466577732 –CAT# K16804

=== Journal Articles ===
Source:
