= Wei-Ting Hwang =

American biostatistician

Wei-Ting Hwang is a Taiwanese biostatistician.

Hwang earned her Bachelor of Science in mathematics from National Tsing Hua University in 1995, then moved to Johns Hopkins University, where she earned a PhD at the Bloomberg School of Public Health in 2001. Hwang is a professor of biostatistics at the University of Pennsylvania's Perelman School of Medicine. In 2022, Hwang was elected a fellow of the American Statistical Association. At the time of her election to ASA fellowship, Hwang was also a member of the International Chinese Statistical Association.
