= Sixia Chen =

Chinese statistician

Sixia Chen is a Chinese statistician.

Chen earned a Bachelor of Science in mathematics at Fudan University in 2007, and obtained his PhD in statistics at Iowa State University in 2012. He worked at Westat until 2015, when he joined the University of Oklahoma Health Science Center as an assistant professor. In 2022, Chen was promoted to associate professor. Chen was elected a fellow of the American Statistical Association in 2026.
