= Lawrence Lin =

American statistician

Lawrence I-Kuei Lin is an American statistician.

Lin earned his doctorate from the University of Iowa in 1979, where, advised by Peter A. Lachenbruch, he authored the dissertation The Effect of Non-Normality on Multiple Group Discrimination and Estimation of the Logistic Risk Function when Data Are Heavy-Tailed with Clumping at Zero.

Lin worked for Baxter Healthcare and is also an adjunct professor at the University of Illinois at Chicago. He was elected a fellow of the American Statistical Association in 2012.
