= Fireworks policy in the Netherlands =

Restrictions on shooting fireworks in the country

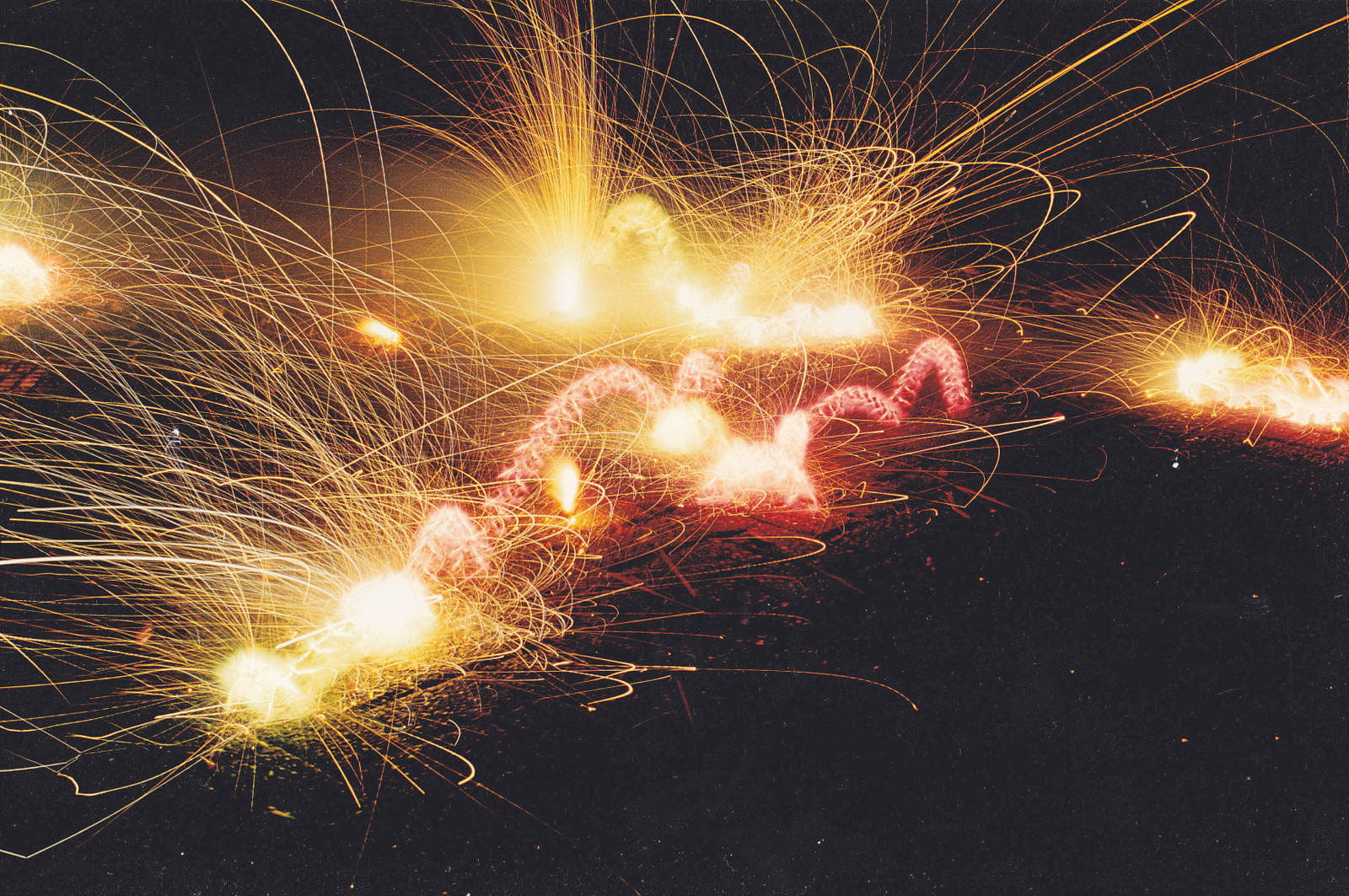
A few "ground flowers" fireworks in the Netherlands, 2013

Fireworks in the Netherlands are mostly regulated by the Vuurwerkbesluit ("Fireworks Decree"), a 1993 law that has subsequently been amended many times to make the rules surrounding the production, testing, transportation, storage, trade, sale, consumption and overall safety of fireworks stricter.

During most of the year, most fireworks are restricted to usage by professionals, but there is an exception for ordinary citizens without any special training or licence to ignite fireworks during New Year's Eve from 6 pm on 31 December to 2 am on 1 January. Especially since the 2000 Enschede fireworks disaster, and more so since the accident-laden New Year's Eve of 2007/08, public discussion on more rigorous regulation or even prohibition on (consumer) fireworks has been frequent and ongoing.

On 1 July 2025, the Senate approved the country's first nationwide ban on category F2 or higher fireworks, originally proposed by House of Representatives members Jesse Klaver (GroenLinks-PvdA) and Esther Ouwehand (Party for the Animals): the law banned the consumer purchase and use of such fireworks, and required community groups to get municipal permission before using them. The ban came into effect on 1 August 2026, with a campaign to help consumers legally dispose unused category F2 or higher fireworks running from 1 September until 9 October the same year.

== Annual events ==
=== New Year's Eve ===
1967 New Year's Eve news item

At New Year's Eve, ordinary Dutch citizens are allowed to light fireworks from 6 pm on 31 December to 2 am on 1 January. Fireworks need to comply to certain legal standards, and may only be sold during the last three days of the year, excluding any Sundays, at a shop that has a licence.

=== Koningsdag ===
During Koningsdag ("King's Day"), several municipalities throughout the country organize fireworks shows by professionals.

=== Vuurwerkfestival Scheveningen ===
The Vuurwerkfestival Scheveningen (Scheveningen Fireworks Festival), conducted by professionals, is annually attended by around 200,000 people. In the summer of 2017, the festival experienced its 38th edition. In 2016, there were winter fireworks shows for the first time.

== Regulation and enforcement ==
2017 Dutch Safety Board report on fireworks risks (English subtitles)

=== Fireworks companies ===
The Netherlands used to host several fireworks manufacturers, but in the late 20th century, almost all production of fireworks was moved abroad. In 2000, there were 26 fireworks companies active in the Netherlands, with branches in Leeuwarden, Appingedam, Lichtenvoorde, Tilburg, The Hague, Enschede, Leiden, Lijnden, Dronten, Lelystad and Landgraaf. 14 of these imported fireworks from especially China for sale on the Dutch market, the 12 other businesses conducted professional fireworks shows. In some factories such as S.E. Fireworks (which ceased producing fireworks itself in 1985), Chinese fireworks were further assembled in the Netherlands before being sold. Since the 1991 explosion of the fireworks factory in Culemborg, almost all fireworks companies operated outside of residential areas; S.E. Fireworks, which caused the 2000 Enschede fireworks disaster, was the last company to still be located in the middle of a residential area before a planned relocation in 2002.

=== Safety testing ===
In the Netherlands, the Netherlands Organisation for Applied Scientific Research (TNO) is responsible for safety testing of fireworks. Since 2010, safety testing of fireworks is required in the entire European Union, but companies are allowed to test their products in one member state before importing and selling them in another. A 2010 document from the Dutch Ministry of Infrastructure and Environment revealed that several fireworks importers in the Netherlands did not yet comply with the new testing regulations, but were not penalised for it because a number of companies claimed they needed more time to implement the changes, and they were granted exceptions by the Ministry. Dream Fireworks owner Frits Pen, who claimed to have had his fireworks tested in Hungary for thousands of euros, sued the Ministry for failing to punish his competitors who were allowed to import and sell untested fireworks for free. In 2014, the Ministry stated that, by then, 80% of the fireworks imported into the Netherlands had a CE marking and were being checked.

According to a 2017 report by the Dutch Safety Board, 25% of all fireworks tested failed to meet safety standards and were banned from sale.

=== Injury, damage and nuisance ===
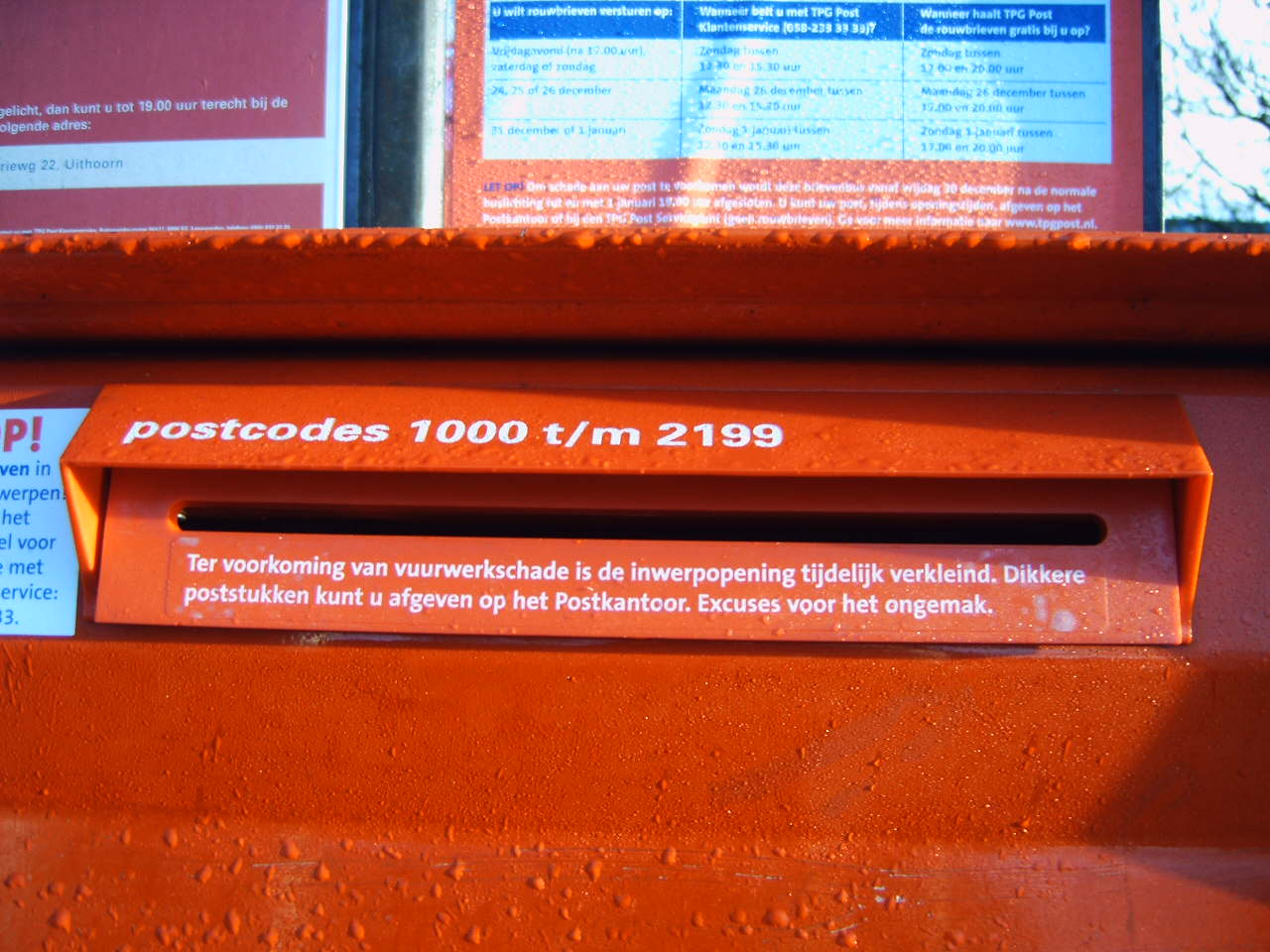
A mailbox made hufterproof ("asshole-proof") to prevent vandals from inserting fireworks

Fireworks in the Netherlands are known to cause various negative effects to users, bystanders and people living nearby, especially around New Year's Eve, when extra police, firefighters and paramedics are deployed to control the situation. Which measures do and do not work, and how matters may be improved without "ruining the party", is subject to ongoing discussion. The negative effects of fireworks can be divided into:

- Noise pollution because of unexpectedly loud explosions (especially troublesome for animals)
- Air pollution because of the smoke created by fireworks (in 2008, smog by fireworks smoke caused dozens of traffic accidents, killing two people)
- Injuries and fear of being hit by fireworks (either by accident or on purpose; during New Year's Eve 2016/17, bystanders were 61% of victims, 39% were the igniters themselves)
- Vandalism and accidents by (illegal) fireworks causing damage and destruction to infrastructure and property
- Disruption of public order by, amongst other things, violence against public servants (police, firefighters and paramedics) using fireworks

=== National and European legislation ===
Prime Minister Balkenende on fireworks and other incidents during New Year's Eve 2007/08

The original Vuurwerkbesluit was adopted in 1993, and was primarily concerned with environmental issues. In the wake of the 2000 Enschede fireworks disaster, the Dutch government approved new rules regarding consumer and professional fireworks on 22 January 2002, especially concerning the safety of fireworks storage. Since then, the Vuurwerkbesluit has been amended a number of additional times, including the 2014 limitation of the period during which fireworks may be lit during New Year's Eve from 10 am to 6 pm on 31 December.

Since the adoption of the 2007 European Pyrotechnic articles Directive, the Dutch Vuurwerkbesluit has been amended by 2010 to harmonise legislation with that of other EU member states concerning, amongst other things, the categorisation, trade and safety of fireworks, and a common approach of countering illegal fireworks. The updated 2013 Pyrotechnic articles Directive led to another amendment of the Vuurwerkbesluit.

So-called "consumer fireworks" (consumentenvuurwerk or particulier vuurwerk) in the Netherlands consists of category F1 (on sale and usable throughout the year by every person aged 12 and older without a special licence or training), and category F2 and F3 (on sale the last three days of the year, Sundays excepted, which are to be lit from 6 pm on 31 December until 2 am on 1 January). Category F4 is reserved for professionals, and aside from New Year's Eve, categories F2 and F3 are also reserved for professionals. In Belgium, Germany and Denmark, the sale of all category F3 fireworks to consumers is forbidden, but in the Netherlands, some fireworks in this category may be purchased by lay people.

Since 2011, the Dutch College of Attorney Generals has pushed for stricter European rules on fireworks, to prevent category F4 fireworks from being bought in other EU countries and smuggled into the Netherlands. Because of "flaws in the Pyrotechnic articles Directive", there are dangers for local security and terrorist threats.

It's an intellectual faux pas to assume accidents, eye injuries, can only be caused by illegal fireworks. No. I suspect 80% of my patients are [harmed by] legal fireworks.
Tjeerd de Faber, ophthalmologist (2014)

The Netherlands also have a considerable illegal fireworks problem. In 2014, about 1 million kilos of illegal fireworks entered the country annually. According to inquiries by VeiligheidNL, illegal fireworks used to cause most fireworks-related injuries (almost two-thirds of all fireworks-related injuries during New Year's Eve 2012–13), but since New Year's Eve of 2013–14 more than half was caused by legal fireworks. Illegal fireworks were responsible for more serious injuries, however, and resulted in four times as many hospitalisations. During New Year's Eve 2014–15, the percentage of injuries by illegal fireworks decreased to almost 40%. During New Year's Eve 2015–16 and 2016–17, illegal fireworks were to blame for about 25% of fireworks-related injuries.

For New Year's Eve 2020–21, the government prohibited fireworks, citing that the number of injuries would place too much stress on the healthcare system during the COVID-19 pandemic in the Netherlands.

On 1 July 2025, the Senate adopted the Safe New Year's Eve bill proposed by Members of Parliament Jesse Klaver (GroenLinks-PvdA) and Esther Ouwehand (PvdD). This will entail a total ban on the use of Category F2, F3 and F4 fireworks by consumers; only professionals may obtain permission for these categories. Category F1 fireworks will still be available for consumers. The ban is expected to come into effect in 2026.

Just after midnight on January 1, 2026, a fire broke out at Amsterdam's Vondelkerk. Authorities traced the cause to rogue fireworks, an incident that has since intensified scrutiny of future fireworks regulations.

== See also ==
- Fireworks law in the United Kingdom
- Fireworks policy in Belgium
- Fireworks policy in the European Union
- Fireworks policy in the United States
