= Neyer d-optimal test =

Sensitivity test method

The Neyer d-optimal method or Neyer d-optimal test is a sensitivity test method. It can be used to answer questions such as "How far can a carton of eggs fall, on average, before one breaks?" If these egg cartons are very expensive, the person running the test would like to minimize the number of cartons dropped, to keep the experiment cheaper and to perform it faster. The Neyer test allows the experimenter to choose the experiment that gives the most information. In this case, given the history of egg cartons which have already been dropped, and whether those cartons broke or not, the Neyer test says "you will learn the most if you drop the next egg carton from a height of 32.123 meters."

== Applications ==
The Neyer test is useful in any situation when you wish to determine the average amount of a given stimulus needed in order to trigger a response. Examples:

- Material Toughness - how far does this type of bottle filled with detergent need to fall before it breaks?
- Drug Efficacy - how much of this drug is enough to cure this diseases?
- Toxicology - what percentage of contaminated seed is enough to cause a bird of this species to die?
- Sensory Threshold - how strong does the light have to be for this photodetector to sense it?
- Damage Threshold - how loud does the sound have to be in order to damage this microphone ?
- Explosives - when does an explosive react?

== History ==
The Neyer-d optimal test was described by Barry T. Neyer in 1994. This method has replaced the earlier Bruceton analysis or "Up and Down Test" that was devised by Wilfrid Dixon and Alexander M. Mood in 1948 to allow computation with pencil and paper. Samples are tested at various stimulus levels, and the results (response or no response) noted. The Neyer Test guides the experimenter to pick test levels that provide the maximum amount of information. Unlike previous methods that have been developed, this method requires the use of a computer program to calculate the test levels.

Although not directly related to the test method, the likelihood ratio analysis method is often used to analyze the results of tests conducted with the Neyer D-Optimal test. The combined test and analysis methods are commonly known as the Neyer Test.

Dror and Steinberg (2008) suggest another experimental design method which is more efficient than Neyer's, by enabling the usage of a D-optimal design criterion from the outset of the experiment. Furthermore, their method is extended to deal with situations which are not handled by previous algorithms, including extension from fully sequential designs (updating the plan after each observation) to group-sequential designs (any partition of the experiment to blocks of numerous observations), from a binary response ("success" or "failure") to any generalized linear model, and from the univariate case to the treatment of multiple predictors (such as designing an experiment to test a response in a medical treatment where the experimenters changes doses of two different drugs).

== See also ==
- Optimal design
- Safety testing of explosives
