= Statsols =

- Products: nQuery Sample Size Software

Statsols (formerly known as Statistical Solutions) is the producer and distributor of the proprietary nQuery sample size software.

== History ==
In 1984, Statsols (Originally known as Statistical Solutions) was a distributor for the statistical software BMDP. This was statistical package developed in 1965 by Wilfrid Joseph Dixon at the University of California, Los Angeles, which performed different parametric and nonparametric statistical analyses.

Through a management buy-out in 1995, President & CEO Mary Byrne who led the all-female buy-out, which was not common at the time, to form the independent company Statistical Solutions Ltd, now known as Statsols. The company now only offers its most successful statistical product, nQuery Sample Size Software.

In 2022, Statsols became part of Dotmatics, the world’s largest and most powerful scientific R&D software platform

== nQuery Sample Size Software ==
Janet Dixon Elashoff is a now-retired American statistician and daughter of the mathematician and statistician Wilfrid Joseph Dixon, creator of BMDP. Janet is the retired Director of the Division of Biostatistics, Cedars-Sinai Medical Center. While at UCLA and Cedars-Sinai during the 1990s, she wrote the program nQuery Sample Size Software (then known as nQuery Advisor). This quickly became widely used to estimate the sample size requirements for pharmaceutical testing and she joined the company Statistical Solutions LLC to commercialize it.

Through many iterations, nQuery Sample Size Software remains widely used in the pharmaceutical industry for the purpose of calculating sample size and for the determination of power for clinical trials. The US National Institutes of Health Library lists over 895 published studies that used nQuery for sample size calculation that are freely available to the public to view. Other public directories available for further research include Google Scholar where there are over 6,000 scientific studies that feature nQuery available to the public for scientific research.
