= Fireworks policy in Belgium =

Government policy for the safety of fireworks in Belgium

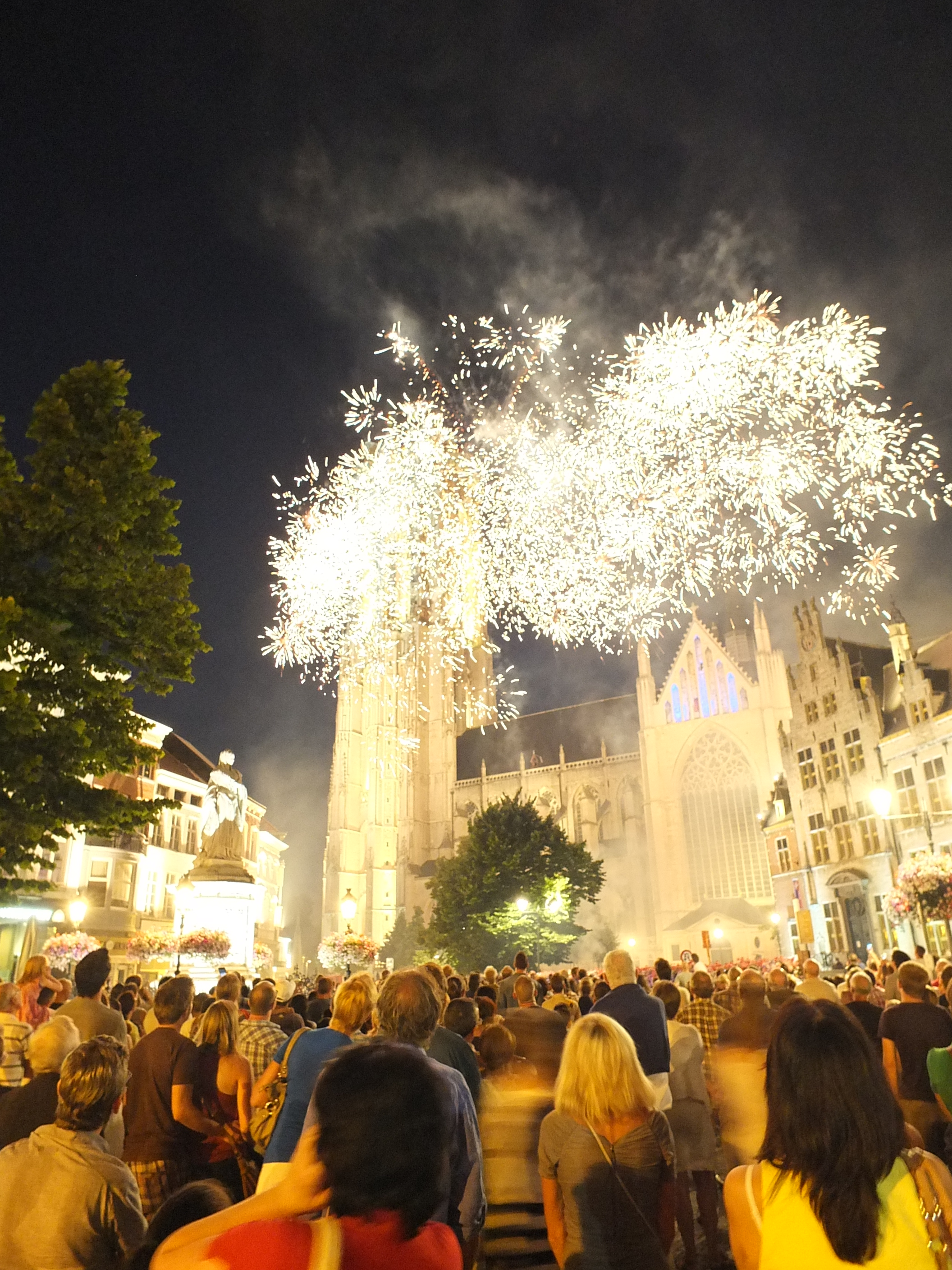
Fireworks show in Mechelen, 21 July 2013

The sales of fireworks in Belgium is federally regulated. Since 5 July 2017, the sale of European category F3 fireworks to non-professionals is a criminal offence; the non-professional customer needs to be at least 12 years old for category F1 and at least 16 years old for category F2; the vendor is required to verify the customer's age.

As of 2017, Belgium does not have a federal policy on the lighting of fireworks, although such regulations have been announced in 2015.

== Flanders ==
In Flanders, the Gemeentedecreet (Municipal Decree) gives the 308 municipalities of the Flemish Region the authority to introduce a required licence for lighting fireworks, or to prohibit the ignition of fireworks on certain locations. In almost all Flemish municipalities, an individual can only get a licence in special circumstances (such as weddings). During New Year's Eve, lighting fireworks without a licence is allowed in 35% of the municipalities, in around 50% a permit from the burgemeester (mayor) is required, and around 14% of municipalities have banned consumer fireworks altogether.

In many major cities, professional fireworks shows are held, attended by tens of thousands of people.

== Brussels ==
Due to measures addressing the COVID-19 pandemic in Belgium, the Brussels Capital Region and the City of Brussels temporarily prohibited the use (and the Region also the possession) of fireworks in public places and open-air private properties (gardens, terraces, balconies) from 23 December 2021 to 9 January 2022. The sale of fireworks was still permitted throughout Belgium.

== See also ==
- Fireworks law in the United Kingdom
- Fireworks policy in the European Union
- Fireworks policy in the Netherlands
- Fireworks policy in the Republic of Ireland
