= Bruceton analysis =

A Bruceton analysis is one way of analyzing the sensitivity of explosives as described originally by Wilfrid Dixon and Alexander M. Mood in 1948. Also known as the "Up and Down Test" or "the staircase method", a Bruceton analysis relies upon two parameters: first stimulus and step size. A stimulus is provided to the sample, and the results noted. If a positive result is noted, then the stimulus is decremented by the step size. If a negative result occurs, the stimulus is increased. The test continues with each sample tested at a stimulus 1 step up or down from the previous stimulus if the previous result was negative or positive.

The results are tabulated and analyzed via Bruceton analysis, a simple computation of sums that can be performed by pencil and paper, to provide estimates of the mean and standard deviation. Confidence estimates are also produced.

Other analysis methods are the Neyer d-optimal test and Dror and Steinberg [2008] sequential procedure. Bruceton analysis has an advantage over the modern techniques being very simple to implement and analyze - as it was designed to be performed without a computer. The modern techniques offer a great improvement in efficiency, needing a much smaller sample size to obtain any desired significance level. Furthermore, these techniques enable the treatment of many other related experimental designs - such as when there is a need to learn the influence of more than one variable (say, testing the sensitivity of an explosive to both shock level and environment temperature), to models which are not only binary by nature (not only "detonate or not"), to experiments where you decide in advance (or "group") on more than one sample in each "run", and more. In fact, with the modern techniques the experimenter is not even constrained to specify a single model and can reflect uncertainty as to the form of the true model.

For mechanical threshold testing, typically on the up down method, originally proposed by Dixon, was used by SR Chaplan et al. in 1994. Their paper tabulated the coefficients required to process the data after testing. The mechanical thresholds generated have a discrete range of values (i.e. do not lie on an analog scale) and thus should be regarded as non-parametric for statistical purposes.

== Worked examples ==
Example 1

Testing performed at an interval of d=0.2, testing commences one step before a change in response.

Test Data
Stimulus (x_{i})				1	2	3	4	5	6	7	8	9	10	11	12	13	14	15	16	17	18	19	20	21	22	23	24	25	26	27	28	29	30	31	32	33	34	35	36	37	38	39	40	41
4.0	X																												X															
3.8		X																										0		X		X												
3.6			X				X								X				X								0				0		X		X		X		X		X		X	
3.4				X		0		X		X		X		0		X		0		X		X				0								0		0		0		0		0		0
3.2					0				0		0		0				0				0		X		0																			
3.0																								0																				

Each test level is assigned an index (i).

Tabulated Data
Stimulus (x_{i})	Index (i)	Number of responses (N_{i})	Number of non-responses (N_{o})
4.0	5	1	0
3.8	4	2	1
3.6	3	9	2
3.4	2	7	10
3.2	1	1	7
3.0	0	0	1
-	Total	20	21

As the number of responses is less than the number of non-responses, the responses are used to determine the 50% value.

Data Analysis
i	N_{i}	i*N_{i}
5	1	5
4	2	8
3	9	27
2	7	14
1	1	1
0	0	0
Total	20	55

N=Sum N_{i} = (1+2+9+7+1+0)=20

A=Sum i*N_{i}=(5+8+27+14+1+0)=55

50% level = X_{0}+d*(A/N-0.5)=3+0.45=3.45

Example 2

Testing performed at an interval of d=0.2, testing commences one step before a change in response.

Test Data
Stimulus (x_{i})	1	2	3	4	5	6	7	8	9	10	11	12	13	14	15	16	17	18	19	20	21	22	23	24	25	26	27	28	29	30	31	32	33
3.8								X																				X					
3.6	X		X		X		0		X		X		X				X		X		X		X		X		X		X		0		X
3.4		0		0		0				0		0		X		0		0		0		0		0		0				0		0	
3.2															0																		

Tabulated Data
Stimulus (x_{i})	Index (i)	Number of responses (N_{i})	Number of non-responses (N_{o})
3.8	3	2	0
3.6	2	14	2
3.4	1	1	13
3.2	0	0	1
-	Total	17	16

As the number of non-responses is less than the number of responses, the non-responses are used to determine the 50% value.

Data Analysis
i	N_{o}	i*N_{o}
3	0	0
2	2	4
1	13	13
0	1	0
Total	16	17

N=Sum N_{o} = (0+2+13+1)=16

A=Sum i*N_{o}=(0+4+13+0)=17

50% level = X_{0}+d*(A/N+0.5)=3.2+0.31=3.51

== See also ==
- Safety Testing of Explosives
