= Nancy Flournoy =

American statistician

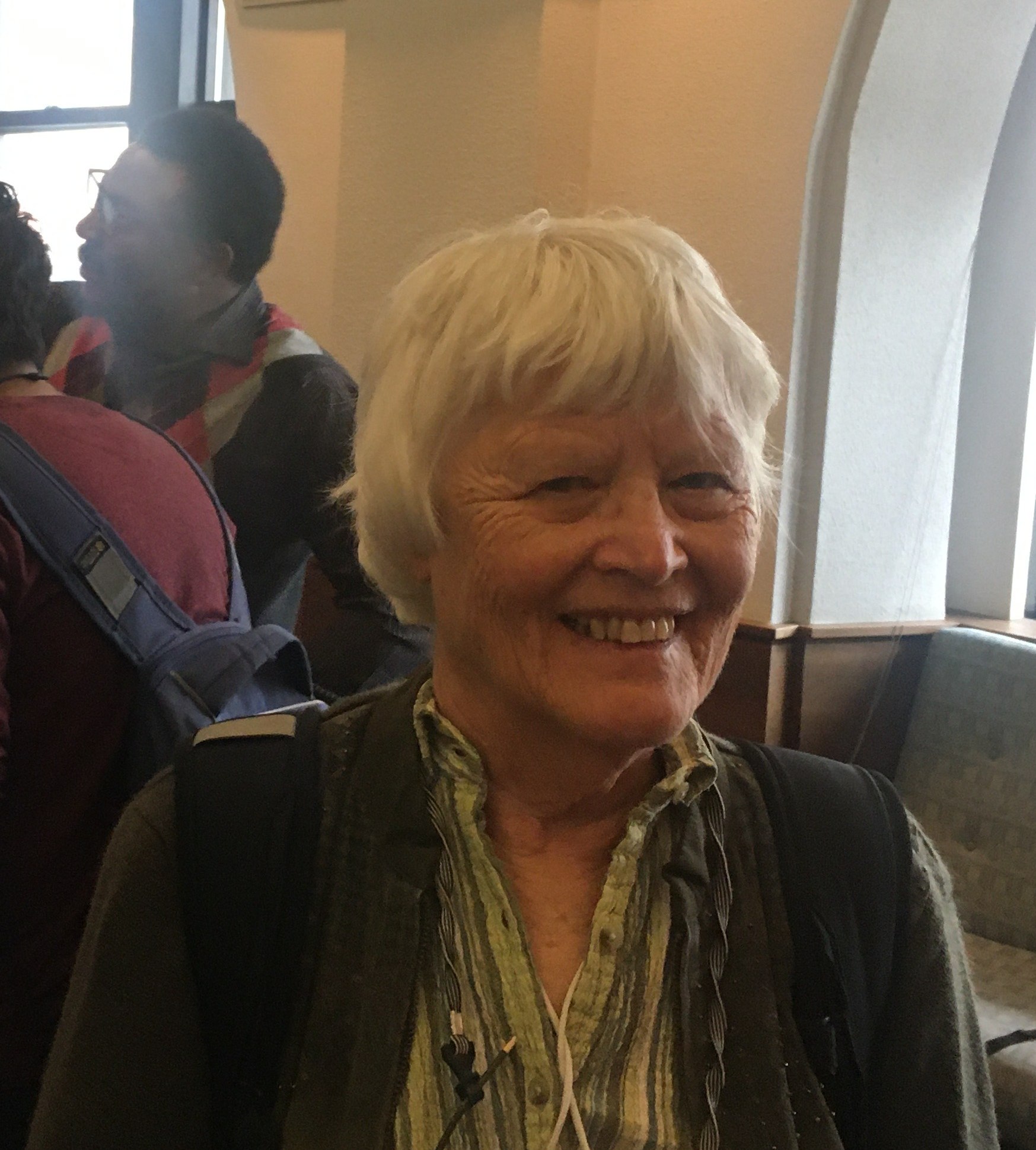
- Nancy Flournoy in 2023
- Born: May 4, 1947 (age 79)
- Spouse: Leonard B. Hearne
- Parent(s): Carr Irvine Flournoy and Elizbeth Blincoe Flournoy
- Awards: Distinguished Service Award from the National Institute for Statistical Sciences; Fellow of the Institute of Mathematical Statistics, the American Statistical Association, the World Academy of Art and Science, and the American Association for the Advancement of Science; Elizabeth Scott and Florence Nightingale David Awards from the Committee of Presents of Statistical Societies; Founders Award from the American Statistical Association; Curators' Distinguished Professor at the University of Missouri

Academic background
- Education: University of California, Los Angeles
- Alma mater: University of Washington
- Thesis: The Failure-Censoring Bichain and the Relative Efficiency of Selected Partial Likelihoods in the Presence of Coprocesses (1982)
- Doctoral advisor: Lloyd Delbert Fisher, Jr.
- Other advisor: Olive Jean Dunn, Wilfrid Dixon

Academic work
- Discipline: Statistics
- Sub-discipline: Design of experiments, Adaptive clinical trials
- Institutions: National Science Foundation, American University, University of Missouri
- Doctoral students: Misrak Gezmu

Nancy Flournoy (born May 4, 1947) is an American statistician. Her research in statistics concerns the design of experiments, and particularly the design of adaptive clinical trials; she is also known for her work on applications of statistics to bone marrow transplantation, and in particular on the graft-versus-tumor effect. She is Curators' Distinguished Professor Emeritus of Statistics at the University of Missouri.

== Early life ==
Flournoy is originally from Long Beach, California, the daughter of Carr Irvine Flournoy, a plumber, and Elizabeth Flournoy (née Blincoe), a preschool teacher. She was educated at the Polytechnic School, and then did her undergraduate studies at the University of California, Los Angeles, graduating with a bachelor's degree in 1969. She married William E. Hoge in 1967, while still an undergraduate at UCLA.

== Education and career ==
She became interested in statistics in her junior year in college after taking a course from Don Ylvisaker. She tried to change majors from nutrition to mathematics but was prevented from doing so because her marriage resulted in a change of names that snarled her paperwork. Instead, she ended up majoring in biostatistics. Working as a statistician at Regional Medical Programs, her superiors were concerned when her presentations gained attention because "she did not look the part". Then they hired a man to present for her. Objecting when asked to do trivial calculations, she was fired for being an "uppity" woman. She returned to UCLA, with Olive Jean Dunn as a mentor, and went on to complete a master's degree in biostatistics in 1971.

Flournoy learned about experimental design in her next job, in educational psychology at the Southwest Education and Laboratory for Research, and by reading Walter Federer's book Experimental Design: Theory and Application, which she imported from India in order to keep up with the experimental psychologists. She joined the pioneering bone marrow transplant team in 1973, under E. Donnall Thomas, and became founding Director of Clinical Statistics at the Fred Hutchinson Cancer Research Center in 1975. At that time, patient records were stored on punched cards, and Flournoy writes of sorting data sets manually at the laundromat while doing laundry. The center hired Leonard Hearne to create a shared clinical database before the term "database" existed, and Flournoy married him in 1978. Her work in this time on the graft-versus-tumor effect become "the first major application of the proportional hazards model with time-dependent covariates".

In 1982, Flournoy completed a doctorate in biomathematics at the University of Washington. Her dissertation, supervised by Lloyd Delbert Fisher Jr., was The Failure-Censoring Bichain and the Relative Efficiency of Selected Partial Likelihoods in the Presence of Coprocesses. On the recommendation of Ingram Olkin, she joined the National Science Foundation as the first female director of statistics in 1986. She made a point of attending talks by young women and encouraging them to apply for grants; by doing so she increased the rate of applications by women from its previous lower value to match the rate of applications by men. She also managed work on a report that led to the founding of the National Institute of Statistical Sciences; she was given an award by the Foundation in 1988 for her encouragement of interdisciplinary research and a Distinguished Service award by the Institute in 2006.

Flournoy became a faculty member in the Department of Mathematics and Statistics of American University in 1988. She focused on adaptive clinical trials, having become disappointed with the learning rate using large randomized comparative trials, each taking five years to complete. To push this area forward, she organized a special session on the topic in 1989 (where she met her frequent early collaborator Steve Durham) and an entire conference on it in 1992.

She became head of the department at American University. However, under president Benjamin Ladner, the university changed its focus and stopped supporting graduate programs in science and technology. In order to maintain her own research program, Flournoy moved from American University to Missouri in 2002. She became chair again at Missouri, stepping down in 2011, and under her leadership, she significantly increased the size and rankings of the department.

== Recognition ==
Flournoy was elected as a Fellow of the Institute of Mathematical Statistics in 1990, the American Statistical Association and the World Academy of Art and Science in 1992, and the American Association for the Advancement of Science in 1993.

In 2000 the Committee of Presidents of Statistical Societies gave Flournoy their Elizabeth L. Scott Award "for her innovative and highly successful efforts in encouraging women to seek competitive research funding; for envisioning and supporting the pioneering Pathways to the Future Workshops; for serving as a role model and mentor for graduate students and young faculty; for her scholarship in teaching and research, and for her many contributions to the statistical sciences". In 2007 they gave her their Florence Nightingale David Award "for her fundamental research contributions in adaptive designs, sequential analysis, clinical trials, and particularly in bone marrow transplantation trials; for her devoted teaching; for her passionate mentoring to young statisticians, new investigators, women, and minorities, and researchers in small universities; for her leadership in the profession including her role as the chair of a major statistics department".

She was named as a Curators' Distinguished Professor in 2012. In the same year she also won the Janet L. Norwood Award For Outstanding Achievement By A Woman In The Statistical Sciences. In 2019 Flournoy received the American Statistical Association Founders Award.
