= Regulation of UAVs in the Republic of Ireland =

In May 2012, the Irish Aviation Authority published a document setting out safety requirements for any unmanned aerial system, regardless of mass. An appendix contained an application form to apply to operate a UAS. The only previous legislation had been the "Irish Aviation Authority (Rockets and Small Aircraft) Order, 2000".

The IAA policy is that unmanned aerial systems may not be flown without the operator receiving a specific permission from the IAA. Where such a craft is to be used for commercial work, the operator must apply for an aerial work permission from the IAA. Flying UAS outside the direct, unaided line of sight of the operator is not allowed for safety reasons. It is not permitted to use vision-enhancing systems, such as first-person view.

On 15 November 2012, the Irish Aviation Authority introduced a requirement that remotely piloted aircraft needed to be registered to comply with Statutory Instrument 634 or 2005 "Nationality and Registration of Aircraft" Order.

On 12 July 2014, the Irish Times reported that the Irish Aviation Authority had issued permits to 22 operators to use UAVs in the Republic, as opposed to 14 the year before. The IAA said each permit issued by the IAA contained the stated reason the operator was using the UAV but that it could not release details of those who were licensed because of data protection legislation.

New regulations, including a registry of UAVs over 1 kg (35 oz) were introduced in December 2015.

== Small Unmanned Aircraft (Drones) and Rockets Order Statutory Instrument 563 of 2015 ==
This statutory instrument prohibits UAVs from flying

- in a manner that is a hazard to another flying aircraft
- in a manner that endangers life or property
- within a prohibited area, a restricted area, or controlled airspace, without prior permission.
- further than 300 m (330 yd) from the operator, more than 120 m (390 ft) from the ground, or out of line of sight
- within 5 km (3.1 mi) of an active aerodrome
- within 30 m (33 yd) of any person, structure or vessel, not under the operators' control
- within 120 m (130 yd) of a group of 12 or more people, not under the operators' control

The operator of a UAV of between 4 and 25 kg (8.8 and 55.1 lb) shall not allow it to fly without taking a course approved by the IAA.

The operator of a UAV of between 25 and 150 kg (55 and 331 lb) shall not allow it to fly without permission from the IAA.

A rocket may not be flown without supplying information to and receiving permission from the IAA.The operator of a UAV of between 4 and 25 kg (8.8 and 55.1 lb) shall not allow it to fly without taking a course approved by the IAA.

The order applies to:

- UAVs of less than 150 kg (330 lb)
- unmanned rockets of more than 1.5 kg (3 lb 5 oz) fuelled mass and more than 100 g (3 1/2 oz) of propellant

The order does not apply to:

- fireworks launched under 400 ft altitude unless launched near an aerodrome
- to a rocket of 100 g (3 1/2 oz) or less propellant or slow-burning propellant made of paper, wood or frangible plastic that isn't operated in a manner hazardous to people, property or aircraft
- to UAVs of less than 1 kg (35 oz) without fuel or made of wood, paper or frangible plastic that is flown below 15m (50') altitude that isn't operated in a manner hazardous to people, property or aircraft

The instrument revokes the Irish Aviation Authority (Rockets and Small Aircraft) Order 2000, (S.I. No. 25 of 2000).

== See also ==
- Fireworks policy in the Republic of Ireland
