= Emanuel Parzen =

American statistician (1929–2016)

- Born: April 21, 1929; New York City, New York, U.S.
- Died: February 6, 2016 (aged 86); Boca Raton, Florida, U.S.
- Education: Harvard College; University of California, Berkeley
- Awards: Samuel S. Wilks Memorial Medal (1994)
- Scientific career
- Fields: Mathematician
- Workplaces: Texas A&M University; SUNY Buffalo; Stanford University; Columbia University
- Doctoral advisor: Michel Loève
- Doctoral students: Grace Wahba; Don Ylvisaker

Emanuel Parzen (April 21, 1929 – February 6, 2016) was an American statistician. He worked and published on signal detection theory and time series analysis, where he pioneered the use of kernel density estimation (also known as the Parzen window in his honor). Parzen was the recipient of the 1994 Samuel S. Wilks Memorial Medal of the American Statistical Association.

== Biography ==
Parzen attended Bronx High School of Science. He then matriculated to Harvard, where he earned his undergraduate degree in mathematics in 1949. From there, he went on to Berkeley, earning his master and doctorate degrees in mathematics in 1951 and 1953, respectively. His dissertation, "On Uniform Convergence of Families of Sequences of Random Variables", was written under Michel Loève.

Parzen went directly into academia after graduate school, first serving as a research scientist in the physics department and assistant professor of mathematical statistics at Columbia University. He left there in 1956 for Stanford University, where he stayed for the next 14 years. During this time, he wrote what has become one of the classical texts in probability theory. In 1970, he accepted the chair of the statistics department at SUNY Buffalo and in 1978 moved to his last post as a Distinguished Professor at Texas A&M University.

Parzen died in Boca Raton, Florida on February 6, 2016. His son, Michael Parzen, is a Senior Lecturer of Statistics at Harvard University.

== Awards ==
- Fellow, American Statistical Association
- Fellow, Institute of Mathematical Statistics
- Fellow, American Association for the Advancement of Science
- Samuel S. Wilks Memorial Medal
