= Henry Lewis Rietz =

American mathematician

Henry Lewis Rietz (24 August 1875, Gilmore, Ohio – 7 December 1943, Iowa City, Iowa) was an American mathematician, actuarial scientist, and statistician, who was a leader in the development of statistical theory. He became the first president of the Institute of Mathematical Statistics.

== Career ==
H. L. Rietz earned his B.S. from Ohio State University in 1889. In 1902 he received a Ph.D. from Cornell University under G. A. Miller. Rietz was a professor of mathematics and astronomy at Butler University in Indianapolis for one year, before becoming a mathematics instructor at the University of Illinois in 1903. As instructor and then professor, he stayed at the U. of Illinois until his departure in 1918. From 1918 until his retirement in 1942, he was a mathematics professor and chair of the mathematics department at the University of Iowa.

In addition to being a professor, Rietz worked as an actuary and consultant. In 1923 he was elected as a Fellow of the American Statistical Association. For the year 1924, he was a president of the Mathematical Association of America, and, for the year 1930, president of the Iowa Academy of Science. In 1935 he was a founding member of the Institute of Mathematical Statistics and became its first president, serving until 1937. He was an editor for the Annals of Mathematical Statistics, the Bulletin of the American Mathematical Society, and the Transactions of the American Mathematical Society. He wrote 156 papers and 11 books. His doctoral students include Samuel Wilks.

== Works ==
- Rietz, H. L.; Crathorne, A. R.; Rietz, J. Charles (1921). Mathematics of Finance. NY: Henry Holt.
- Rietz, H. L., Editor-in-Chief; Carver, H. C.; Crathorne, A. R.; Crum, W. L.; Glover, James W.; Huntington, E. V.; Kelley, Truman L.; Persons, Warren M.; Young, Allyn A. (1924). Handbook of Mathematical Statistics. Boston: Houghton Mifflin.
- Rietz, H. L. (1924). "On certain topics in the mathematical theory of statistics". Bull. Amer. Math. Soc. 30 (8): 417–453. doi:10.1090/s0002-9904-1924-03944-5. MR 1560938.
- "On the representation of a certain law of probability". Bull. Amer. Math. Soc. 27 (2): 197–212. 1925. doi:10.1090/s0002-9947-1925-1501307-5. MR 1501307.
- Mathematical Statistics. Vol. 3 of Carus Mathematical Monographs. Chicago: Open Court. 1927.
- Rietz, H. L. (December 1927). "On Certain Properties of Frequency Distributions of Powers and Roots of the Variates of a Given Distribution". Proc Natl Acad Sci U S A. 13 (12): 817–820. Bibcode:1927PNAS...13..817R. doi:10.1073/pnas.13.12.817. PMC 1085253. PMID 16587284.
- Rietz, H. L. (1932). "On the Lexis theory and the analysis of variance". Bull. Amer. Math. Soc. 38 (10): 731–735. doi:10.1090/s0002-9904-1932-05518-5. MR 1562498.
- Rietz, H. L. (1937). "Some topics in sampling theory". Bull. Amer. Math. Soc. 43 (4): 209–230. doi:10.1090/s0002-9904-1937-06516-5. MR 1563513.
