= Laura Lee Johnson =

American statistician

- Education: University of Virginia (BA); University of Washington (MS, PhD)
- Awards: Fellow of the American Statistical Association
- Scientific career
- Fields: Biostatistics
- Workplaces: National Institutes of Health; Food and Drug Administration; National Center for Complementary and Integrative Health; Center for Drug Evaluation and Research
- Thesis: Incorporating death into the statistical analysis of categorical longitudinal health status data (2002)
- Doctoral advisor: Paula Diehr

Laura Lee Johnson is an American biostatistician who has worked in several capacities within the federal government, including as Director of the Division of Biometrics III at the Center for Drug Evaluation and Research Office of Biostatistics.

== Biography ==
After obtaining her Bachelor of Arts in mathematics at the University of Virginia, Johnson later moved to the University of Washington, where she obtained her Master of Science in biostatistics. She later obtained her Doctor of Philosophy there in 2002; her dissertation, which was supervised by Paula Diehr, was titled Incorporating death into the statistical analysis of categorical longitudinal health status data. She was also a United States Department of Veterans Affairs Health Services Research & Development trainee and a National Cancer Institute Center for Cancer Research fellow.

After working in clinical research and research support at the National Institutes of Health (NIH) for more than a decade, she later moved to the Food and Drug Administration (FDA). In 2004, she also began working at the National Center for Complementary and Integrative Health, where she works as a statistician in clinical studies. She later began working at the Center for Drug Evaluation and Research Office of Biostatistics as Director of the Division of Biometrics III. At the NIH, she has also served as a co-director of their Principles and Practice of Clinical Research course.

She was elected Fellow of the American Statistical Association in 2020.
