= Yash Mittal =

Probability theorist

Yashaswini Deval Mittal (born 1941) is a retired mathematician specializing in probability theory and mathematical statistics. She is a professor emerita of mathematics at the University of Arizona.

Mittal has a Ph.D. from the University of California, Los Angeles, completed in 1972. Her dissertation, Limiting Behaviour of Maxima in Stationary Gaussian Process, was supervised by Don Ylvisaker. In 1986, she became the first female program director for probability theory at the National Science Foundation, in the same year that Nancy Flournoy became its first female program director for statistics. She was named a Fellow of the Institute of Mathematical Statistics in 1988, "for outstanding and noteworthy contributions to probability theory and its applications, for work in extreme value theory, and for dedicated and conscientious service to the profession and to the IMS". In her retirement from Arizona, she has become an avid origami folder.

== Selected publications ==
- Mittal, Y.; Ylvisaker, D. (1975), "Limit distributions for the maxima of stationary Gaussian processes", Stochastic Processes and Their Applications, 3: 1–18, doi:10.1016/0304-4149(75)90002-2, MR 0413243
- Stuetzle, Werner; Mittal, Yashaswini (1979), "Some comments on the asymptotic behavior of robust smoothers", in Gasser, Th.; Rosenblatt, M. (eds.), Smoothing Techniques for Curve Estimation, Proceedings of a Workshop held in Heidelberg, April 2–4, 1979, Lecture Notes in Mathematics, vol. 757, Berlin: Springer, pp. 191–195, doi:10.1007/BFb0098497, ISBN 3-540-09706-6, MR 0564259
- Good, I. J.; Mittal, Y. (1987), "The amalgamation and geometry of two-by-two contingency tables", Annals of Statistics, 15 (2): 694–711, doi:10.1214/aos/1176350369, MR 0888434
- Mittal, Yashaswini (1991), "Homogeneity of subpopulations and Simpson's paradox", Journal of the American Statistical Association, 86 (413): 167–172, doi:10.2307/2289727, JSTOR 2289727
