= BMDP =

Bio-Medical software

BMDP was a statistical package developed in 1965 by Wilfrid Dixon at the University of California, Los Angeles. The acronym stands for Bio-Medical Data Package, the word package was added by Dixon as the software consisted of a series of programs (subroutines) which performed different parametric and nonparametric statistical analyses.

BMDP was originally distributed for free. It was later sold by Statsols, who originally was a subsidiary of BMDP, but through a management buy-out formed the now independent company Statistical Solutions Ltd, known as Statsols. BMDP is no longer available as of 2017. The company decided to only offer its other statistical product nQuery Sample Size Software.
