= George W. Brown (computer scientist) =

American statistician (1917–2005)

- Born: June 2, 1917; Boston, Massachessets, US
- Died: June 20, 2005 (aged 88); Irvine, California, US
- Education: Princeton University; Harvard University
- Known for: Fictitious play Brown–von Neumann–Nash Dynamics
- Scientific career
- Workplaces: Princeton University; RAND Corporation; Iowa State University; UCLA; UC Irvine
- Thesis: Reduction of a Certain Class of Composite Statistical Hypotheses (1940)
- Doctoral advisor: Samuel S. Wilks

George William Brown (June 2, 1917 – June 20, 2005) was an American statistician, game theorist, and computer scientist known for his work and research in early computing machinery, game theory, mathematical logic, decision theory and administration. He was a major force in the design and construction of early computing machinery, including the IAS machine, and subsequently directed the construction of JOHNNIAC. His publication of EDUNET in 1967 presaged the details and rise of the early internet. The concept of fictitious play in game theory is due to him.

== Biography ==
Brown received his S.B in 1937 and his S.M in 1938, both from Harvard University. He then moved to Princeton University and was awarded his Ph.D. there in 1940 under advisor Samuel Wilks. After graduation he was initially unable to get a job in academia due to the antisemitism of the time, and his first job was in the research division of R. H. Macy & Co. (now Macy's Department Store) where he did statistical studies of the store's operations and met his first wife, Bobbie. After the attack on Pearl Harbor, he returned to Princeton to work on military research projects (he first tried to enlist in the navy but was turned down due to his color blindness). In 1944 he moved to the RCA Labs, still in Princeton, and joined the group of Jan A. Rajchman where he helped design the Selectron tube, an early form of digital computer memory. During this time, he also contributed to the IAS machine under John von Neumann with whom he would later collaborate on theoretical topics as well.

In 1946 he was finally granted a tenure-track professorial role at Iowa State University as an Associate Professor of Mathematics and Statistics, alongside his longtime friend and colleague Alexander M. Mood. By 1947 he had been granted a full professorship but decided to leave for the RAND Corporation to become chief of their Numerical Analysis Department in 1948. It was at RAND that he began the JOHNNIAC project, named after John von Neumann and based on the IAS machine and selectron tube memory. Due to his familiarity with the IAS machine and other early computers he worked as a consultant for IBM and other early computing companies. During this time, he was also a Visiting Professor of Engineering and Mathematics at UCLA.

After a foray into early pay television with Telemeter (pay television), he became the first director of the Western Data Processing Center at UCLA in 1957 and with that a professor in, and head of, the Dept. of Business Administration (later to become the School of Management). This shift to administration was due to IBM's offer to provide a free large-scale high-speed computer to UCLA, if they would employ Brown as the director of the computer laboratory. He was also attracted to this arrangement because of his disillusionment with the usual process by which universities acquired their first computers, saying "...look into how universities financed their participation with computers and you will discover that they sold their souls to Defense Department bookkeeping." During this time he was also heavily involved in directing early computing industry startups including Dataproducts. In 1967 he moved to UC Irvine to become the dean of the Graduate School of Administration (now Paul Merage School of Business). During this career transition from early computing technologies to administration, he worked on applying decision theory and game theoretic techniques to organizational structure and business administration. He stayed at Irvine until his retirement in 1982.

Outside of academia, Brown was a member of the SATCOM task group for the 'Interchange of Scientific and Technical Information in Machine Language (ISTIM)' established in 1969 by the President's Special Assistant for Science and Technology (precursor to the modern-day Office of Science and Technology Policy). Brown was an early and important member of EDUCOM (Interuniversity Communication Council, a precursor to the modern Educause] which championed the idea of connected computing and network information sharing (read: early internet) for the university computing systems of the day. In 1966 Brown organized the 'Summer Study on Information Networks' in Boulder, Colorado as EDUCOM's first major project. The result of this workshop was the publication of EDUNET (by Brown, James Grier Miller, and Thomas A. Keenan), a master plan for a communications network linking universities and colleges through the US. From the modern perspective EDUNET is seen a prophetic landmark, but never achieved the funding necessary to implement, and the ideas expressed in the paper would take several more decades to be fully realized.

The George W. Brown award for 'Overall Academic Excellence and Exceptional Service to the Paul Merage School of Business' is awarded yearly by UC Irvine.

== U.S. Patents ==
- U.S. patent 2,519,172 Electron Discharge Control, 1950.

=== Notable papers ===
- Brown, G.W. (1951) "Iterative Solutions of Games by Fictitious Play" In Activity Analysis of Production and Allocation, T.C. Koopmans (Ed.), New York: Wiley.
- G. Brown and J. von Neumann, "Solutions of Games by Differential Equations," in: H. Kuhn and A. Tucker (eds.) Contributions to the Theory of Games, Annals of Mathematics Studies No. 24, Princeton University Press, Princeton, 1950, pp. 75–79
- G.W. Brown, J. G. Miller, T. A. Keenan, "EDUNET: Report of the Summer Study on Information Networks," Wiley, New York, 1967, pp. 241–372.
