= Misrak Gezmu =

Ethiopian-American statistician

Misrak Gezmu is an Ethiopian-American statistician who works as a mathematical statistician and grant officer for the Biostatistics Research Branch of the National Institute of Allergy and Infectious Diseases. She is known for her pioneering doctoral research on the statistics of up-and-down designs.

Gezmu is originally from Ethiopia. She earned a Ph.D. in statistics from American University in Washington, D.C. in 1996; Her doctoral dissertation, The Geometric Up-and-Down Design for Allocating Dosage Levels, was supervised by Nancy Flournoy. While still a doctoral student, she became an assistant professor of decision sciences at Norfolk State University in Virginia in 1993. She moved to the National Institute of Allergy and Infectious Diseases in 1998.

Gezmu is a Fellow of the American Statistical Association, elected to the 2022 class of fellows.
