= George Abram Miller =

American mathematician (1863–1951)

George A. Miller
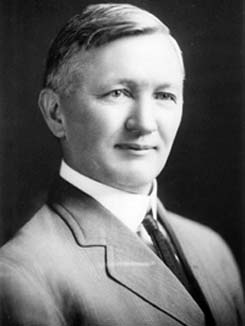
- Born: July 31, 1863; Lynnville, Lehigh County, Pennsylvania
- Died: February 10, 1951 (aged 87); Urbana, Illinois
- Education: Cumberland University
- Scientific career
- Fields: Mathematics
- Workplaces: University of Illinois; University of Michigan
- Doctoral advisor: Frank Nelson Cole
- Doctoral students: Henry Louis Rietz

George Abram Miller (31 July 1863 – 10 February 1951) was an American mathematician, an early group theorist.

== Biography ==
At the age of seventeen, Miller began school-teaching to raise funds for higher education. In 1882, he entered Franklin and Marshall Academy, and progressed to Muhlenberg College in 1884. He received his B.A. in 1887 and M.A. in 1890.

While a graduate student, Miller was Principal of schools in Greeley, Kansas and then professor of mathematics as Eureka College in Eureka, Illinois. He corresponded with Cumberland University in Lebanon, Tennessee for his Ph.D. in 1892.

He then joined Frank Nelson Cole at the University of Michigan and began to study groups. In 1895, he traveled to Europe, where he heard Sophus Lie lecture at Leipzig and Camille Jordan at Paris. In 1897, he traveled to Cornell University, where he worked as an assistant professor, and, in 1901, went to Stanford University, where he worked as associate professor. In 1906, he went to the University of Illinois, where he taught until his retirement in 1931.

Miller helped in the enumeration of finite groups of degree 8, 9, and 10. Arthur Cayley had listed 198 groups of degree 8 in 1891, and Miller found two more making the total 200 in 1893. Camille Jordan had given a list for degree 9 in 1872, re-examined by Cole, and brought up to 258 groups by Miller. In 1894 Miller produced a list of 294 intransitive groups of degree 10. In consequence, the Academy of Science of Cracow awarded a prize and "Miller came to prominence in the mathematical world abruptly."

Miller was president of the Mathematical Association of America from 1921 to 1922 and gave a plenary address at the International Congress of Mathematicians in 1924 in Toronto. Miller's Collected Works were edited by Henry Roy Brahana and published by University of Illinois Press, the first two volumes appearing in 1935 and 1939. The final three volumes were published in 1946, 1955, and 1959. His doctoral students include H. L. Rietz.

== Publications ==
- 1892: An introduction to the study of Determinants, with examples and applications.
- 1905: Groups of subtraction and division.
- 1908: "On the multiple holomorphs of a group", Mathematische Annalen 66(1): 133-142
- 1911: "Abstract definitions of all the substitution groups whose degrees do not exceed seven", American Journal of Mathematics
- 1911: The Algebraic Equation
- 1916: (with H. F. Blichfeldt, & L. E. Dickson) Theory and Application of Finite Groups from University of Michigan Historical Math Collection, original publisher: John Wiley & Sons.
- 1916: Historical Introduction to Mathematical Literature from Cornell University Historical Math Monographs, original publisher Macmillan Publishers.
- 1947: "An Eleventh Lesson in the History of Mathematics", Mathematics Magazine 21(1): 48-55.
