= Annals of Mathematical Statistics =

- Discipline: Statistics and Probability
- Language: English

Publication details
- History: 1930–1972
- Publisher: Institute of Mathematical Statistics (United States)

Standard abbreviations
- ISO 4: Ann. Math. Stat.
- MathSciNet: Ann. Math. Statist.

Indexing
- ISSN: 0003-4851
- JSTOR: 00034851

Links
- Journal homepage

The Annals of Mathematical Statistics was a peer-reviewed statistics journal published by the Institute of Mathematical Statistics from 1930 to 1972. It was superseded by the Annals of Statistics and the Annals of Probability. In 1938, Samuel Wilks became editor-in-chief of the Annals and recruited a remarkable editorial staff: Fisher, Neyman, Cramér, Hotelling, Egon Pearson, Georges Darmois, Allen T. Craig, Deming, von Mises, H. L. Rietz, and Shewhart.
