= Janet D. Elashoff =

American statistician

- Born: Janet Dixon
- Education: Harvard University (PhD)
- Known for: nQuery Advisor
- Scientific career
- Workplaces: Stanford University
- Thesis: Optimal Choice of Rater Teams (1966)
- Father: Wilfrid Dixon

Janet D. Elashoff is a retired American statistician, formerly the director of biostatistics for Cedars-Sinai Medical Center and professor of biomathematics at UCLA.

== Early life ==
Janet Dixon was the daughter of mathematician and statistician Wilfrid Dixon. She completed her Ph.D. in statistics at Harvard University in 1966; her dissertation was Optimal Choice of Rater Teams.

== Career ==
She became a faculty member in the Department of Education and Statistics at Stanford University. With educational psychologist Richard E. Snow, she co-authored Pygmalion Reconsidered: A Case Study in Statistical Inference (C. A. Jones Publishing, 1971), a book on how teacher expectations affect student learning. She served on the Analysis Advisory Committee of the National Assessment of Educational Progress beginning in the mid-1970s, and chaired the committee in 1982.

While at UCLA and Cedars-Sinai, she wrote the program nQuery Advisor, widely used to estimate the sample size requirements for pharmaceutical testing, and spun off the company Statistical Solutions LLC to commercialize it.

She has been a Fellow of the American Statistical Association since 1978, following in the steps of her father who was also a Fellow of the ASA.
