= Harry C. Carver =

American mathematician (1890–1977)

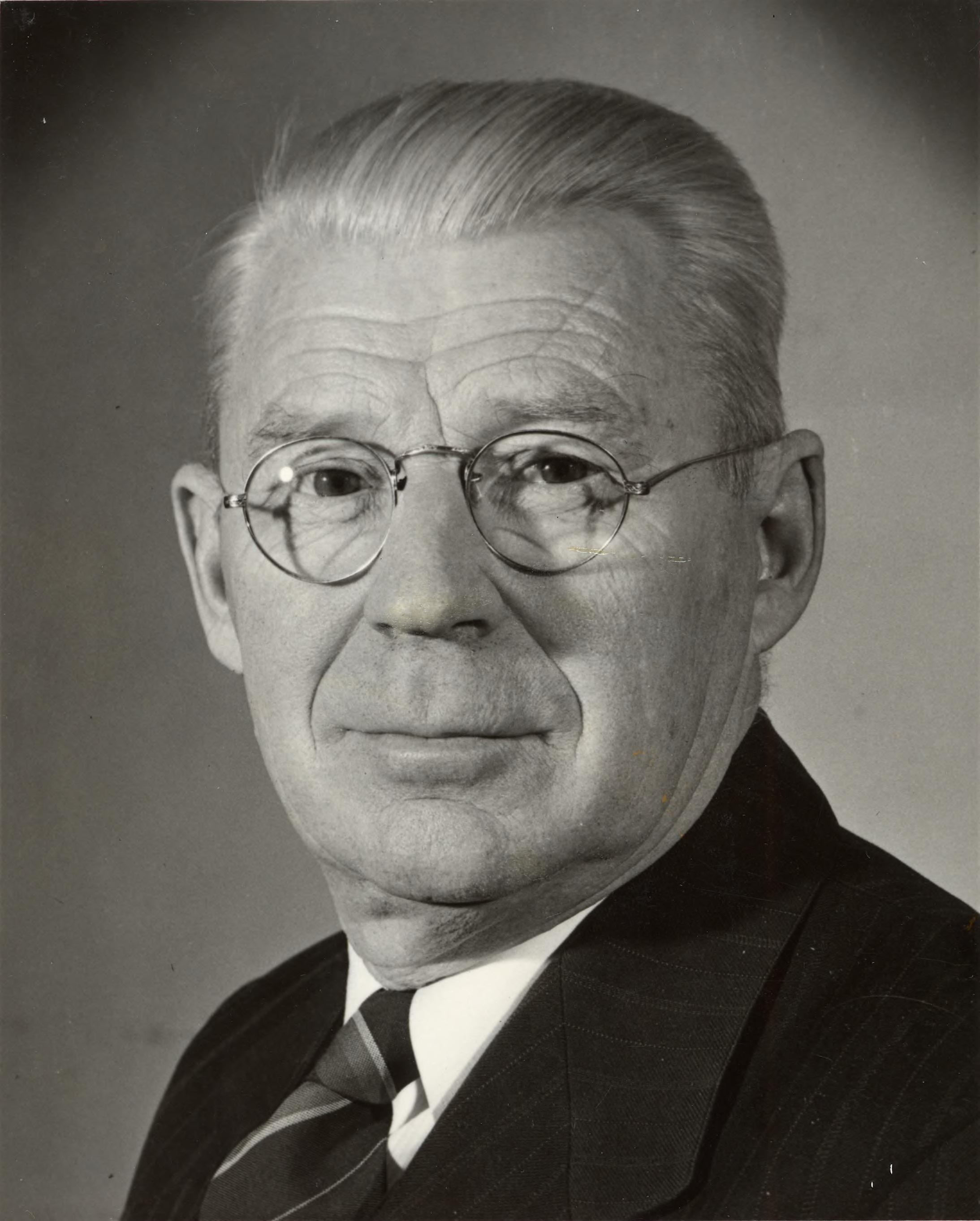
University of Michigan faculty portrait

Harry Clyde Carver (December 4, 1890 – January 30, 1977) was an American mathematician and academic, primarily associated with the University of Michigan. He was a major influence in the development of mathematical statistics as an academic discipline.

Born in Waterbury, Connecticut, Carver was educated at the University of Michigan, earning his B.S. degree in 1915, and the next year becoming an instructor in mathematics; he taught statistics in actuarial applications. At the time, the University of Michigan was only the second such institution in the United States to offer this type of course, after the pioneering Iowa State University. Carver was appointed assistant professor at Michigan in 1918, then associate professor (1921) and full professor (1936); during this period the University's program in mathematical statistics and probability underwent significant expansion.

In 1930, Carver founded the journal Annals of Mathematical Statistics, which over time became an important periodical in the field. Financial support, however, was lacking in the midst of the Great Depression; in January 1934, Carver undertook financial responsibility for the Annals and maintained the existence of the journal at his own expense. In 1935, he helped to start the Institute of Mathematical Statistics, which in 1938 assumed control over the journal; Samuel S. Wilks succeeded Carver as editor in the same year. The Institute has named its Harry C. Carver Medal after him.

With the coming of World War II, Carver devoted his energies to solving problems in aerial navigation, an interest he maintained for the remainder of his life.

In one lecture titled "Let Us Own Data Science" given by Bin Yu in 2014 at Peking University, Carver was described as in the following formula: Turner + Carver = "Data Scientist".
