= Samuel S. Wilks =

American mathematician (1906–1964)

- Born: June 17, 1906; Little Elm, Texas
- Died: March 7, 1964 (aged 57); Princeton, New Jersey
- Education: University of Iowa
- Known for: Wilks's lambda distribution
- Scientific career
- Fields: Mathematical statistics
- Workplaces: Princeton University
- Thesis: On the Distributions of Statistics in Samples from a Normal Population of Two Variables with Matched Sampling of One Variable (1931)
- Doctoral advisor: Henry Louis Rietz
- Doctoral students: Theodore Wilbur Anderson; Wilfrid Dixon; Ted Harris; Donald A. S. Fraser; Frederick Mosteller; George W. Brown; Alexander M. Mood

Samuel Stanley Wilks (June 17, 1906 – March 7, 1964) was an American mathematician and academic who played an important role in the development of mathematical statistics, especially in regard to practical applications.

== Early life and education ==
Wilks was born in Little Elm, Texas and raised on a farm. He studied Industrial Arts at the North Texas State Teachers College in Denton, Texas, obtaining his bachelor's degree in 1926. He received his master's degree in mathematics in 1928 from the University of Texas. He obtained his Ph.D. at the University of Iowa under Henry Louis Rietz.

== Career ==
Wilks became an instructor in mathematics at Princeton University in 1933; in 1938 he assumed the editorship of the journal Annals of Mathematical Statistics in place of Harry C. Carver. Wilks assembled an advisory board for the journal that included major figures in statistics and probability, among them Ronald Fisher, Jerzy Neyman, and Egon Pearson.

During World War II he was a consultant with the Office of Naval Research. Both during and after the War he had a profound impact on the application of statistical methods to all aspects of military planning.

Wilks was named professor of mathematics and director of the Section of Mathematical Statistics at Princeton in 1944, and became chairman of the Division of Mathematics at the university in 1958.

Wilks died in 1964 in Princeton.

== Work in mathematical statistics ==
He was noted for his work on multivariate statistics. He also conducted work on unit-weighted regression, proving the idea that under a wide variety of common conditions, almost all sets of weights will yield composites that are very highly correlated, a result that has been dubbed Wilks's theorem.

Another result, also called “Wilks' theorem” occurs in the theory of likelihood ratio tests, where Wilks showed the distribution of log likelihood ratios is asymptotically $\chi^2$.

From the start of his career, Wilks favored a strong focus on practical applications for the increasingly abstract field of mathematical statistics; he also influenced other researchers, notably John Tukey, in a similar direction. Drawing upon the background of his thesis, Wilks worked with the Educational Testing Service in developing the standardized tests like the SAT that have had a profound effect on American education. He also worked with Walter Shewhart on statistical applications in quality control in manufacturing.

Wilks's lambda distribution is a probability distribution related to two independent Wishart distributed variables. It is important in multivariate statistics and likelihood-ratio tests.

== Honors ==
The American Statistical Association named its Wilks Memorial Award in his honor. Wilks was elected to the American Philosophical Society in 1948 and the American Academy of Arts and Sciences in 1963. He was elected a fellow of the Econometric Society in 1947.
