= Safety testing of explosives =

The safety testing of explosives involves the determination of various properties of the different energetic materials that are used in commercial, mining, and military applications. It is highly desirable to measure the conditions under which explosives can be set off for several reasons, including: safety in handling, safety in storage, and safety in use.

It would be very difficult to provide an absolute scale for sensitivity with respect to the different properties of explosives. Therefore, it is generally required that one or more compounds be considered a standard for comparison to those compounds being tested. For example, PETN is considered to be a primary explosive by some individuals, and a secondary explosive by others. As a general rule, PETN is considered to be either a relatively insensitive primary explosive, or one of the most sensitive secondary explosives. PETN may be detonated by striking with a hammer on a hard steel surface (a very dangerous thing to do), and is generally considered the least sensitive explosive with which this may be done. For these facts and other reasons, PETN is considered one standard by which other explosives are gauged.

Another explosive that is used as a calibration standard is TNT, which was afforded the arbitrary Figure of Insensitivity of 100. Other explosives could then be compared against this standard.

== Types of safety testing ==
Because there are different ways to set off explosives, there are several different components to the safety testing of explosives:

- Impact testing: The impact testing of explosives is performed by dropping a fixed weight onto a prepared sample of the explosive to be tested from a given distance. The weight is released, impacts upon the sample, and the result is noted. The impact distances are determined and the results are analyzed by the sensitivity test and analysis methods selected. The two most common sensitivity test and analysis methods are the Bruceton analysis and Neyer d-optimal test. These methods allow the user to determine the 50% initiation level (the distance at which 50% of the samples will "go"), and a standard deviation. Impact testing may also be performed with liquid samples confined in special cells.
- Friction testing. There are several techniques through which explosives may be tested to determine their sensitivity to friction. One of the most popular is the ABL friction test, which uses a line of explosives on a prepared metal plate, placed in front of a specially prepared metal wheel that is forced down upon the plate with a hydraulic press. The metal plate is then struck with a pendulum to move it, squeezing the explosives between plate and wheel as the plate moves. Initiation is determined, and analyzed by the Bruceton analysis or Neyer d-optimal test, as above. BAM friction testing is similar, except that the sample is placed on a ceramic plate which is then moved side-to-side as a ceramic peg exerts force on the sample.
- Electrostatic discharge. Testing for ESD, or "spark" sensitivity of explosives is performed with a machine designed to discharge from a capacitor through a prepared sample. The Sandia National Labs design employs a dipping needle that punctures a sample cell and discharges the spark simultaneously. The amount of energy discharged into the cell becomes the variable in which Bruceton analysis or Neyer d-optimal test is performed to determine spark sensitivity.
- Thermal sensitivity. Determining the point at which a compound is capable of detonating under confinement with thermal stress is useful. A fixed quantity of material is placed in an aluminum blasting cap shell, and pressed into place with an aluminum plug. The sample is immersed in a hot metal bath, and the time-to-detonation is measured. If over 60 seconds, a fresh sample is run again at a higher temperature. In this manner, it is possible to determine the temperature at which an explosive will detonate on the small scale. Unlike the other tests above, this figure is misleading as explosives have more thermal issues on the large scale. Therefore, the thermal sensitivity figures established using this technique are higher than one would expect in the real world. Thermal safety testing may also be performed via differential scanning calorimetry, in which a small (sub-milligram) sample is placed in a sample cell, and the temperature is increased slowly. The calorimeter determines how much energy is required to increase the temperature of the sample. Using this device, characteristics such as the melting point, phase transitions and decomposition temperature of an explosive may be determined.

Used together, these numbers may be used to determine the potential threats afforded by energetic materials when employed in the field. It cannot be stressed enough that these figures are relative; when we determine that impact sensitivity of an explosive is lower for that of a tested explosive than PETN, for example, the number produced in the impact test is dimensionless, but it means that it is expected that it would take a greater impact to detonate it than PETN. Therefore, an experienced ordnance technician who works with raw PETN will know that the new explosive is not as sensitive with regards to impact. However, it could be more sensitive to friction, spark, or thermal issues. These conditions must be taken into account before any compound is to be stored, handled, or used in the field.

== Fireworks ==
In the Netherlands, the Netherlands Organisation for Applied Scientific Research tests the safety of fireworks. According to a 2017 report by the Dutch Safety Board, 25% of all fireworks tested failed to meet safety standards and were banned from sale. Since 2010, safety testing of fireworks is required in the entire European Union, but companies are allowed to test their products in one member state before importing and selling them in another.
