= Paula Diehr =

American biostatistician

Paula K. Hagedorn Diehr
- Education: Harvey Mudd College; University of California, Los Angeles (PhD)
- Scientific career
- Fields: Statistics
- Workplaces: University of Washington
- Thesis: The Mixture Problem in Tiny Samples (1970)
- Doctoral advisor: Wilfrid Dixon

Paula K. Hagedorn Diehr is an American biostatistician whose research topics generally concern health systems and ageing, and have included work on spatial variability and longitudinal data, health care utilization, mental health, insurance, diagnosis, and prediction of healthy life expectancies. She is a professor emerita of biostatistics, with a joint appointment in health systems and population health, at the University of Washington.

== Education and career ==
Diehr graduated from Harvey Mudd College in 1963. She went to the University of California, Los Angeles for graduate study, earning a master's degree and Ph.D. in biostatistics there. Her 1970 doctoral dissertation, The Mixture Problem in Tiny Samples, was supervised by Wilfrid Dixon. She joined the University of Washington faculty in 1970.

== Recognition ==
Diehr was named a Fellow of the American Statistical Association in 1994, a Fellow of the Association for Health Services Research in 1996, and a Fellow of the American Association for the Advancement of Science in 1997.

In 2013 Harvey Mudd College gave her their HMC Outstanding Alumni Award.
