= Don Ylvisaker =

American mathematical statistician (1933–2022)

- Born: September 23, 1933; Minneapolis, Minnesota, USA
- Died: March 20, 2022 (aged 88); Santa Barbara, California, USA
- Education: Concordia College; University of Nebraska; Stanford University
- Scientific career
- Institutions: New York University; University of Washington; UCLA
- Thesis: On Time Series Analysis and Reproducing Kernel Spaces (1960)
- Doctoral advisor: Emanuel Parzen
- Doctoral students: Yash Mittal, Paul Speckman

Nils Donald Ylvisaker (September 23, 1933 – March 20, 2022), often known as Don Ylvisaker, was an American mathematical statistician.

== Education and career ==
Ylvisaker was born in Minneapolis, Minnesota, USA. He studied at Concordia College and obtained his BA in mathematics and economics in 1954. He then continued his study in mathematics at the University of Nebraska and obtained an MA in 1956. He received his Ph.D. in statistics from Stanford University in 1960 under the supervision of Emanuel Parzen. Ylvisaker was Parzen's first PhD student at Stanford.

Ylvisaker taught at Columbia University, New York University, and the University of Washington, before moving to the University of California, Los Angeles, where he remained until his retirement in 1996. He was one of the founding members of the Department of Statistics at UCLA.

== Recognition ==
Ylvisaker was named a Fellow of the American Statistical Association in 1991.

== Personal life ==
Besides academic research, Ylvisaker served as a statistical consultant to the California State Lottery. Ylvisaker's wife Anna Ylvisaker (née Ricci) works at the UCLA Department of Mathematics.

Ylvisaker died on March 20, 2022.

== Bibliography ==
- Diaconis, Persi; Ylvisaker, Donald (1979-03-01). "Conjugate priors for exponential families". The Annals of Statistics. 7 (2). doi:10.1214/aos/1176344611. ISSN 0090-5364.
- Gangolli, R. A.; Ylvisaker, Donald (1967). Discrete probability. New York: Harcourt, Brace & World. ISBN 0-15-517690-0. OCLC 313642.
