= Fireworks law in the United Kingdom =

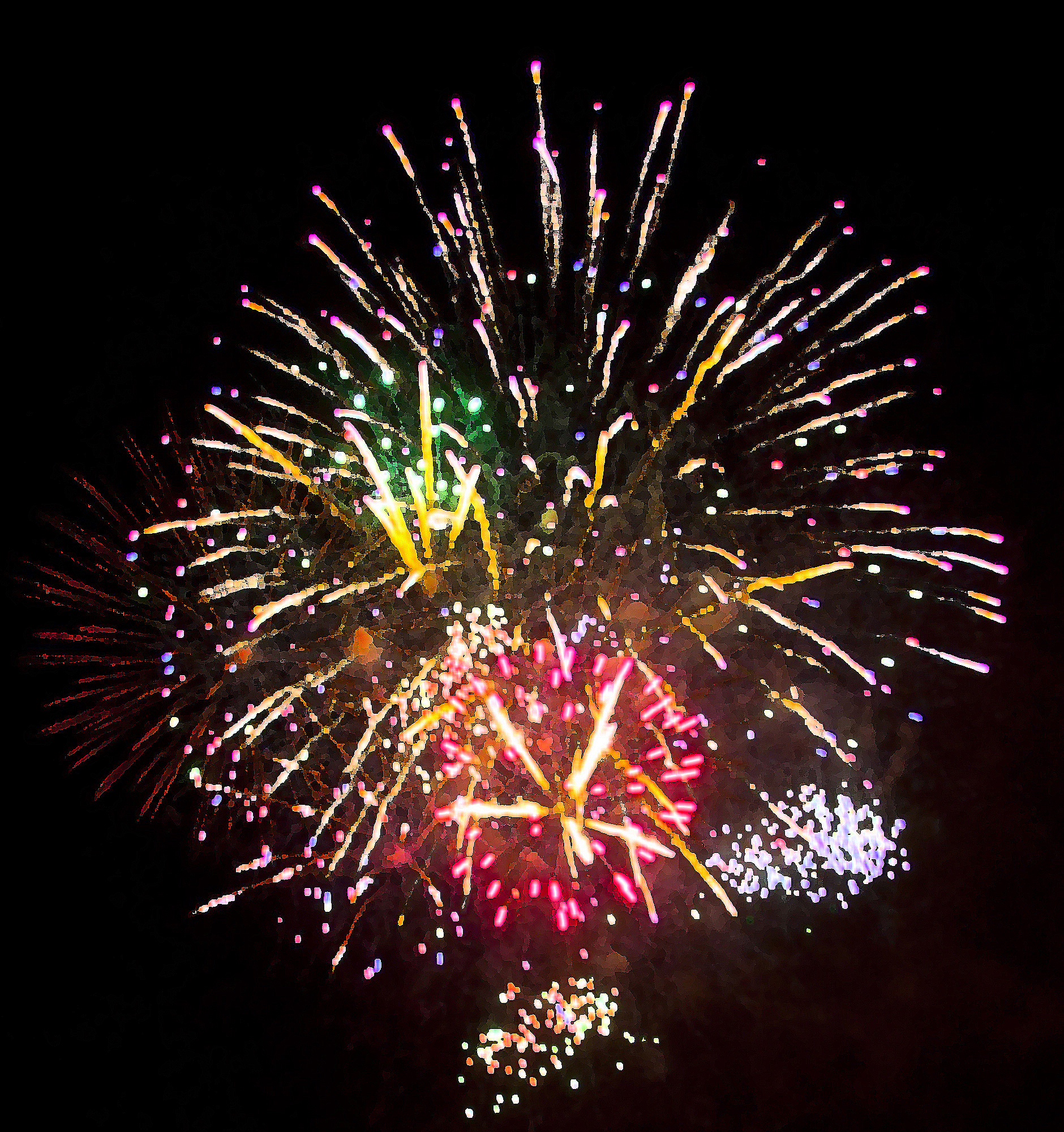
Fireworks over Birmingham, 1 January 2010

Fireworks in England, Scotland and Wales are governed primarily by the Fireworks Regulations 2004 (under powers delegated from the Fireworks Act 2003), the Pyrotechnic Articles (Safety) Regulations 2015, and British Standards BS 7114 until 4/7/17 and BS-EN 15947-2015. In Northern Ireland, fireworks are governed by The Pyrotechnic Articles (Safety) Regulations 2015, and Explosives (Fireworks) Regulations (NI) 2002.

== Categories ==
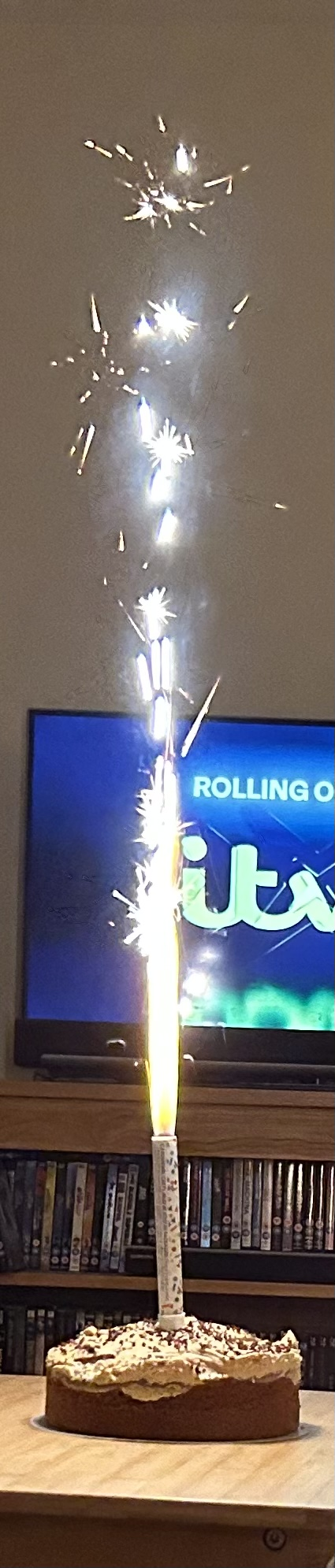
A cake fountain after being placed on top of a birthday cake and lit. This pyrotechnic device is a type of small gerb, and is an example of an indoor firework, which are designated as Category 1 fireworks.

BS 7114 defines four 'categories' for fireworks.

=== Fireworks available to the public ===
The sale of Category 1 fireworks are restricted to persons aged 16 and older, while the minimum age set for Category 2 and 3 fireworks is 18.

Otherwise, all fireworks, since 1997, must comply with BS7114, and be marked accordingly and fall into one of the following three categories:

- Category 1 ("indoor") fireworks are for use in extremely restricted areas.
- Category 2 ("garden") fireworks must be safely viewable from 5 metres (16 ft) away, and must scatter no debris beyond a 3-metre (9.8 ft) range.
- Category 3 ("display") fireworks must be safely viewable from 25 metres (82 ft) away, and must scatter no debris beyond a 20-metre (66 ft) range.

Under BS14035, there are also now Category 2 fireworks that require a longer distance of 8 metres (26 ft), providing potentially better effects than 5-metre (16 ft) fireworks but without the fallout of Category 3 fireworks.

Fireworks that are louder than 120 dB at 15 metres (49 ft) cannot be sold to the public.

It is not illegal for a firework to be set off at less than the minimum safely viewable distance; however, in the event of any injury to a spectator, the firer might be liable if the distance was too short.

A Category 3 firework will contain no more than 1 kg (2.2 lb) net explosive content (NEC) in the case of combinations and fountains, except for fountain combinations, which can contain up to 3 kg (6.6 lb) of net explosive content.

=== Professional fireworks ===
- Category 4 ("professional") fireworks are for sale only to fireworks professionals. They have no restrictions, and this is the default category for any firework which has not been tested to confirm that it should be in one of the lower categories.

Company directors are liable under the Health and Safety at Work Act for the safety of their employees, and prosecutions have occurred.

== Banned fireworks ==
- Mortar Shells: all fireworks of the "aerial shell"/"mortar shell" type, which launch single, large projectiles into the air where they explode to create effects - are Category 4. This was as a result of the deaths in 1996 of Stephen Timcke and David Hattersley, who were killed by mortars on successive nights.
- Mini-rockets, bangers, firecrackers, fireworks of erratic flight (including jumping fireworks) were banned in 1997.
- In 2004 the definition of mini-rocket was further restricted, and airbombs were also banned, in an effort to stop anti-social behaviour involving fireworks.

== Storage ==
In terms of transport and storage, fireworks with a 'minor blast hazard', UN Category 1.3g are distinguished from those without that hazard, namely UN category 1.4g. Fireworks containing more than 25 grams (0.88 oz) of flash powder will be in category 1.3g, and many fall into Category 3, legal for public sale; however the cost of complying with storage regulations means that retailers may choose not to sell 1.3g fireworks.

Consumers may hold up to 5 kg (11 lb) NEC 1.4G fireworks for personal use for an unlimited time and 50 kg (110 lb) NEC up to 21 days. For 1.3G fireworks, 5 kg (11 lb) can also be kept for an unlimited time and up to 100 kg (220 lb) for 5 days. Any amount of either 1.3g or 1.4g may be held for up to 24 hours. If storing for longer periods, a license is required if storing more than 5 kg (11 lb) NEC.

== Restrictions on sale (England, Scotland and Wales) ==
Except for specially licensed year-round firework shops, fireworks are only for sale for Chinese New Year and three days prior, Diwali and three days prior, from 15 October to 10 November (for Guy Fawkes Night), and from 26 to 31 December (for New Year). Typically supermarkets and other general retail outlets sell fireworks in the October–November period and for new year, but do not sell at the other periods in most areas.

In England and Wales, illegally using or buying fireworks can result in imprisonment for up to six months and an unlimited fine. The maximum fine had been £5,000 (level 5 on the standard scale) until 12 March 2015, when section 85 of the Legal Aid, Sentencing and Punishment of Offenders Act 2012 removed the cap for such offences committed on or after that date. In Scotland, the maximum fine for comparable offences remains £5,000 (level 5 on the standard scale).

== Restrictions on use (England, Scotland and Wales) ==
Fireworks must not be let off between 11pm and 7am, except on Chinese New Year, Diwali and New Year's Eve, when the period is extended until 1am, and on Guy Fawkes Night, when the period is extended until midnight.

It is illegal to set off fireworks (including sparklers) in the street or public place. Section 28 of the Town Police Clauses Act 1847 prohibits setting off, or throwing fireworks in the street. Breaking these laws can result in an on-the-spot fine of £90.

== Northern Ireland ==
Due to its unique security situation, regulations for fireworks are different in Northern Ireland.

=== Restrictions ===
In Northern Ireland it is illegal to buy, possess and use fireworks without a valid fireworks licence, with the exception of indoor fireworks and sparklers. 515 firework licences were issued in Northern Ireland around Halloween in 2016.

=== History ===
Until 1996, during the Troubles, fireworks were completely restricted, except for organised public displays. There were concerns that the noise of fireworks could be confused with the sound of bombs or gunfire, as well as fears that they could be used as weapons or parts of bombs.

=== Cross-Border Issues ===
In the Republic of Ireland, sale, possession and use of fireworks is illegal for non-professionals, and is punishable by fines and/or prison. Due to the relative ease of being able to purchase from Northern Ireland however, a large amount of fireworks are still smuggled and set off in the Republic of Ireland.

=== Penalties ===
In Northern Ireland, fireworks offences carry a maximum fine of £5,000 or a three month prison sentence - half the sentence of assault, or both.

== Accidents and safety campaigns ==
In the UK, the most common injuries are burns from hand-held fireworks such as sparklers. People are also injured by projectiles fired from fireworks, often due to incorrect use. Other issues include the dangers of falling rocket sticks, especially from larger rockets containing metal motors.

"Shock" adverts were used in the 1970s and 80s in an attempt to restrict injuries from fireworks, targeted at young people.

=== Firework Code ===
In the United Kingdom, the Firework Code (sometimes Firework safety code) is the name given to a number of similar sets of guidelines for the safe use of fireworks by the general public.

These include a thirteen-point guideline issued by the British government, a ten-point guide issued by the Royal Society for the Prevention of Accidents, a twelve-point guide from Cheshire Fire and Rescue Service, and a nine-point "firework safety code" from the London Fire Brigade. The first of these guidelines was published by the British government in 2008.

== DIY fireworks and storage ==
The manufacture and sale of fireworks requires licensing as above. However, The Manufacture and Storage of Explosives Regulations 2005 made provision, in section 5 para 3 for exceptions to the licensing requirements for up to 100 g (3.5 oz) of any explosive, or 30 kilograms (66 lb) of shooters' powder and 300 grams (11 oz) of percussion caps may be stored without the local authority licensing regime (although clearly to make or store explosive material with the intention to cause public nuisance or damage to persons or property would be illegal under other laws.). The 2014 amendments retain these exceptions in section 6 para 2. This clause is probably aimed at chemistry teaching establishments, and to allow trainers of police dogs etc. to carry small quantities, but can be exploited by enthusiasts wishing to experiment with small quantities of explosives at home. The UK Pyrotechnic Society publishes advice for people who want to safely and lawfully manufacture experimental pyrotechnic compositions or articles.

== See also ==
- Firearms policy in the United Kingdom
- Fireworks policy in the European Union
