= Wilfrid Dixon =

American statistician (1915–2008)

- Born: December 13, 1915; Portland, Oregon
- Died: September 20, 2008 (aged 92)
- Education: Princeton University; University of Wisconsin–Madison
- Known for: BMDP
- Scientific career
- Fields: Mathematical statistics
- Workplaces: University of California, Los Angeles; University of Oregon
- Doctoral advisor: Samuel S. Wilks
- Doctoral students: Paula Diehr

Wilfrid Joseph Dixon (December 13, 1915 – September 20, 2008) was an American mathematician and statistician. He made notable contributions to nonparametric statistics, statistical education and experimental design.

A native of Portland, Oregon, Dixon received a bachelor's degree in mathematics from Oregon State College in 1938. He continued his graduate studies at the University of Wisconsin–Madison, where he earned a master's degree in 1939. Under supervision of Samuel S. Wilks, he then earned a Ph.D. in mathematical statistics from Princeton in 1944. During World War II, he was an operations analyst on Guam.

Dixon was on the faculties at Oklahoma (1942–1943), Oregon (1946–1955), and UCLA (1955–1986, then emeritus). While at Oregon, Dixon (together with Alexander M. Mood) described and provided theory and estimation methods for the adaptive Up-and-Down experimental design, which was new and poorly documented at the time. This article became the cornerstone publication for up-and-down, a family of designs used in many scientific, engineering and medical fields, and to which Dixon continued to contribute in later years. In 1951 Dixon, together with Frank Massey, published a statistics textbook - the first such textbook intended to a non-mathematical audience. In 1955 he was elected as a Fellow of the American Statistical Association.

In the 1960s at UCLA, Dixon developed BMDP, a statistical software package for biomedical analyses.

His daughter, Janet D. Elashoff, is also a statistician who became a UCLA faculty member, and was named an ASA fellow in 1978. In December 2008 she funded the American Statistical Association's W. J. Dixon Award for Excellence in Statistical Consulting in his honor.
