= Fireworks policy in the European Union =

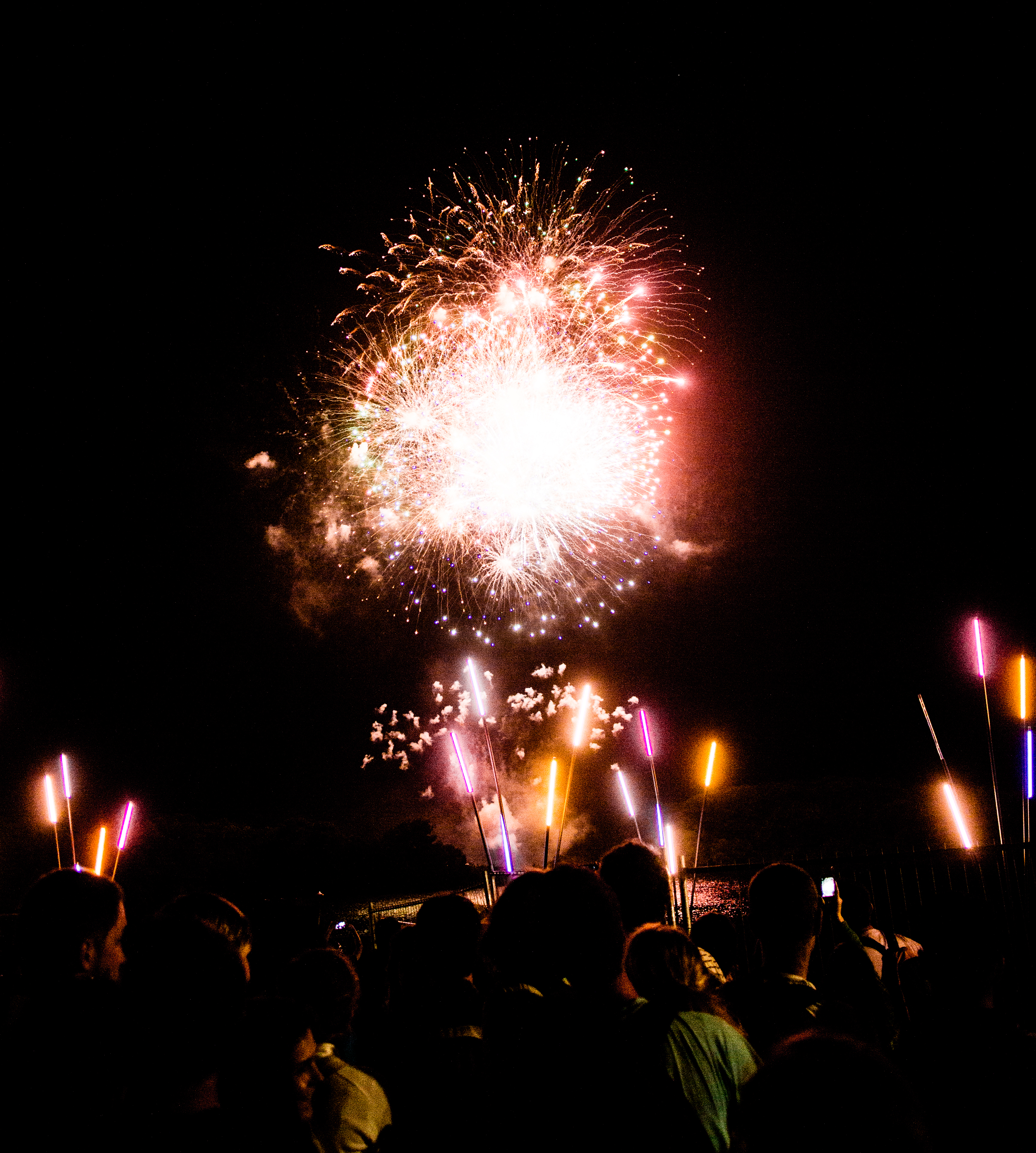
Fireworks at Eurockéennes 2013 in Belfort, France

The fireworks policy in the European Union is aimed at standardising the EU member states' policies on the regulation of production, transportation, sale, consumption, and overall safety of fireworks across the European Union. Regulation is achieved via Directive 2013/29/EU on the harmonisation of the laws of the Member States relating to the making available on the market of pyrotechnic articles.

== History ==
After a 2003 consultation, the European Commission introduced a proposal for a European guideline to harmonise the international trade in and safety of fireworks on 11 October 2005. The proposal classified fireworks into four categories on the European level. It stipulated that Category 4 is exclusively meant for professional usage, and that member states are allowed to limit the sale of fireworks to the public concerning the categories 2 and 3. The proposed minimal requirements for age limits can be heightened by the member states.

This led to Directive 2007/23/EC, which was to be embedded into the member states' laws by 4 January 2010, to be applied by 4 July 2010 to fireworks of category 1, 2 and 3, and to be applied to all other pyrotechnic articles by 4 July 2013. On 12 June 2013, Directive 2013/29/EU was adopted, which the Member States were to enact in national law by 4 July 2017.

Since 2010, safety testing of fireworks is required in the entire Union, but companies are allowed to test their products in one member state before importing and selling them in another. A 2010 document from the Dutch Ministry of Infrastructure and Environment revealed that several fireworks importers in the Netherlands did not yet comply to the new testing regulations, but were not penalised for it, because a number of companies claimed they needed more time to implement the changes and were granted exceptions by the Ministry. Dream Fireworks owner Frits Pen, who claimed to have had his fireworks tested in Hungary for thousands of euros, sued the Ministry for failing to punish his competitors who were allowed to import and sell untested fireworks for free. In 2014, the Ministry stated that, by then, 80% of the fireworks imported into the Netherlands had a CE marking and were being checked.

== European Union fireworks standards ==
The European Union's import rules for fireworks and firecrackers mainly consist of the requirements included in Directive 2013/29/EU, such as harmonised standards including EN 15947 and CE marking.

== Categorisation of fireworks ==
Fireworks in the Europe Union are classified into four categories:

- Category F1: fireworks which pose very little danger (such as sparklers), and are intended for use in a closed space, including fireworks intended for use outside residential buildings;
- Category F2: fireworks which pose little danger, and are intended for use outside residential buildings in a closed space;
- Category F3: fireworks which pose average danger, and are intended for use outside residential buildings in a large open space;
- Category F4: fireworks which pose grave danger, and are exclusively intended for persons with specialised knowledge (pyrotechnicians), often called "fireworks for professional usage".

The minimal ages set by the Directive are:

- Category 1: 12 years old
- Category 2: 16 years old
- Category 3: 18 years old

Category F4 fireworks are restricted to professionals throughout the EU. Individual member states are allowed to prohibit the sale, possession and usage of other categories by consumers as well, if they so choose. In Belgium and Germany, amateurs cannot buy category F3; in the Republic of Ireland, they can neither buy category F3 nor F2. Germany and France have also raised the age for category F2 fireworks from 16 to 18.

== Member state policies ==
The EU's regulations on fireworks are the minimum standards for all member states, but the states are allowed to legislate on additional restrictions within their respective territories.

=== Belgium ===
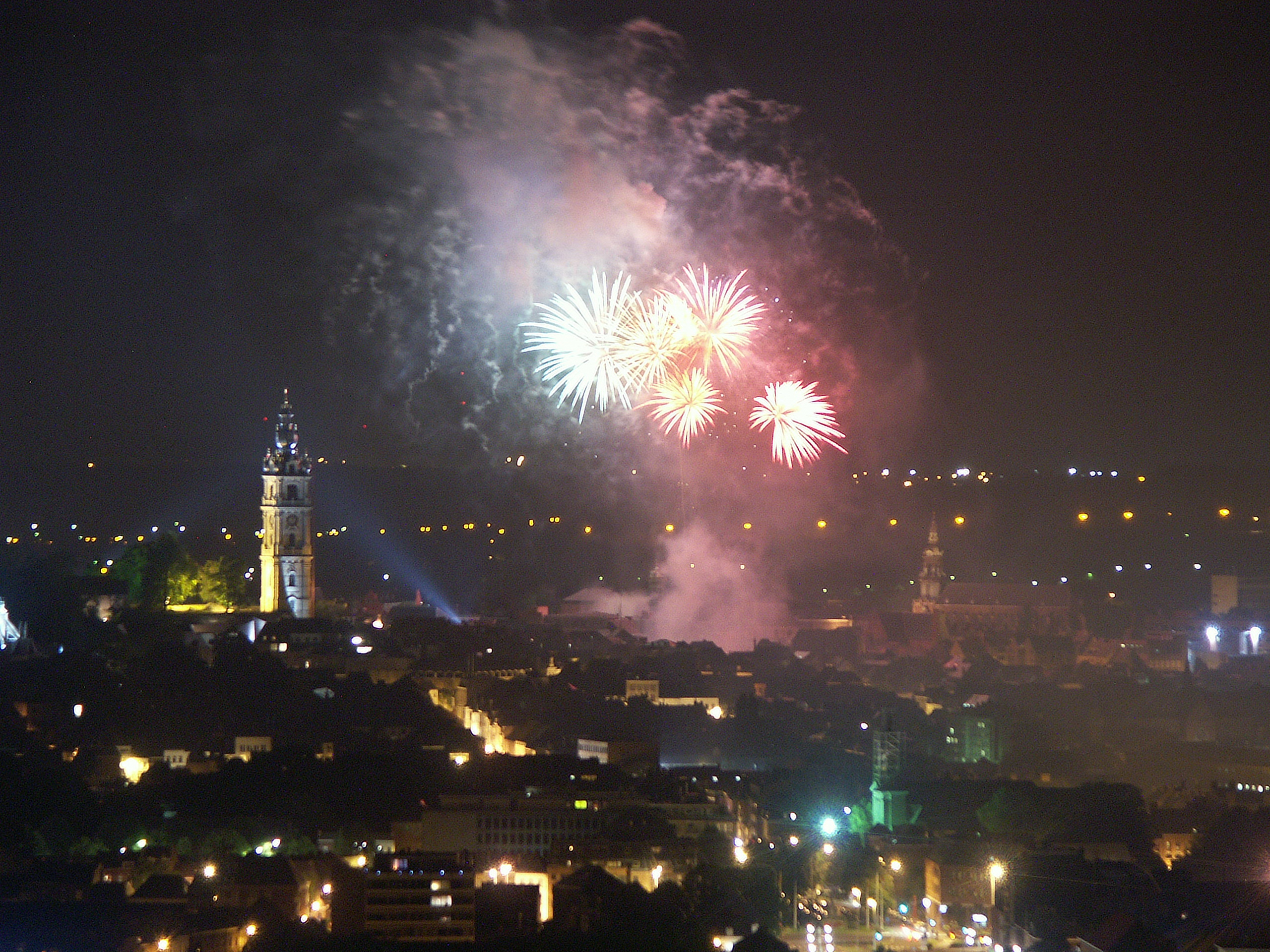
Fireworks over the city of Mons, 2007

Since 5 July 2017, the sale of category F3 fireworks to non-professionals is a criminal offence in Belgium. The non-professional customer needs to be at least 12 years old for category F1 and at least 16 years old for category F2; the vendor is required to verify the customer's age. In Flanders, the Gemeentedecreet (Municipal Decree) gives the 308 municipalities of the Flemish Region the authority to introduce a required licence for lighting fireworks, or to prohibit the ignition of fireworks on certain locations.

=== Germany ===
In Germany, amateurs over 18 years old are allowed to buy and ignite fireworks of Category F2 for several hours on 31 December and 1 January; each German municipality is authorised to limit the number of hours this may last locally. The sale of Category F3 and F4 fireworks to consumers is prohibited. Lighting fireworks is forbidden near churches, hospitals, retirement homes and wooden or thatch-roofed buildings. All major German cities organise professional fireworks shows. In December 2025, a petition by the Trade Union of the German Police for a ban on private fireworks had over 2.5 million signatures and is already considered the largest petition in Germany ever.

=== Finland ===
In Finland those under 18 years old have not been allowed to buy any fireworks since 2009. Safety goggles are required. The use of fireworks is generally allowed on the evening and night of New Year's Eve, December 31. In some municipalities of Western Finland it is allowed to use fireworks without a fire station's permission on the last weekend of August as part of Venetian Festival celebrations. With the fire station's permission, fireworks can be used year-round.

=== Netherlands ===
2017 Dutch Safety Board report on fireworks risks (English subtitles)

Fireworks in the Netherlands are mostly regulated by the Vuurwerkbesluit ("Fireworks Decree"), a 1993 law that has subsequently been amended many times to make the rules surrounding the production, testing, transportation, storage, trade, sale, consumption and overall safety of fireworks stricter and in line with EU directives.

Category F2, F3, and F4 fireworks are generally restricted to professional use only. F2 fireworks (with some exceptions) may be sold to the general public during the last three days of the year (excluding any Sunday) for private usage on New Year's Eve (between 6 p.m. on 31 December and 2 a.m. on 1 January), without any special training or licensing.

Especially since the 2000 Enschede fireworks disaster, and more so since the accident-laden New Year's Eve of 2007–08, public discussion on more rigorous regulation or even prohibition on (consumer) fireworks has been frequent and ongoing. 19 municipalities have banned private fireworks altogether.

On 1 July 2025, the Senate adopted the Safe New Year's Eve bill proposed by Members of Parliament Jesse Klaver (GroenLinks-PvdA) and Esther Ouwehand (PvdD). This will entail a total ban on the use of Category F2, F3 and F4 fireworks by consumers; only professionals may obtain permission for these categories. Category F1 fireworks will still be available for consumers. The ban is expected to come into effect in 2026.

=== Republic of Ireland ===
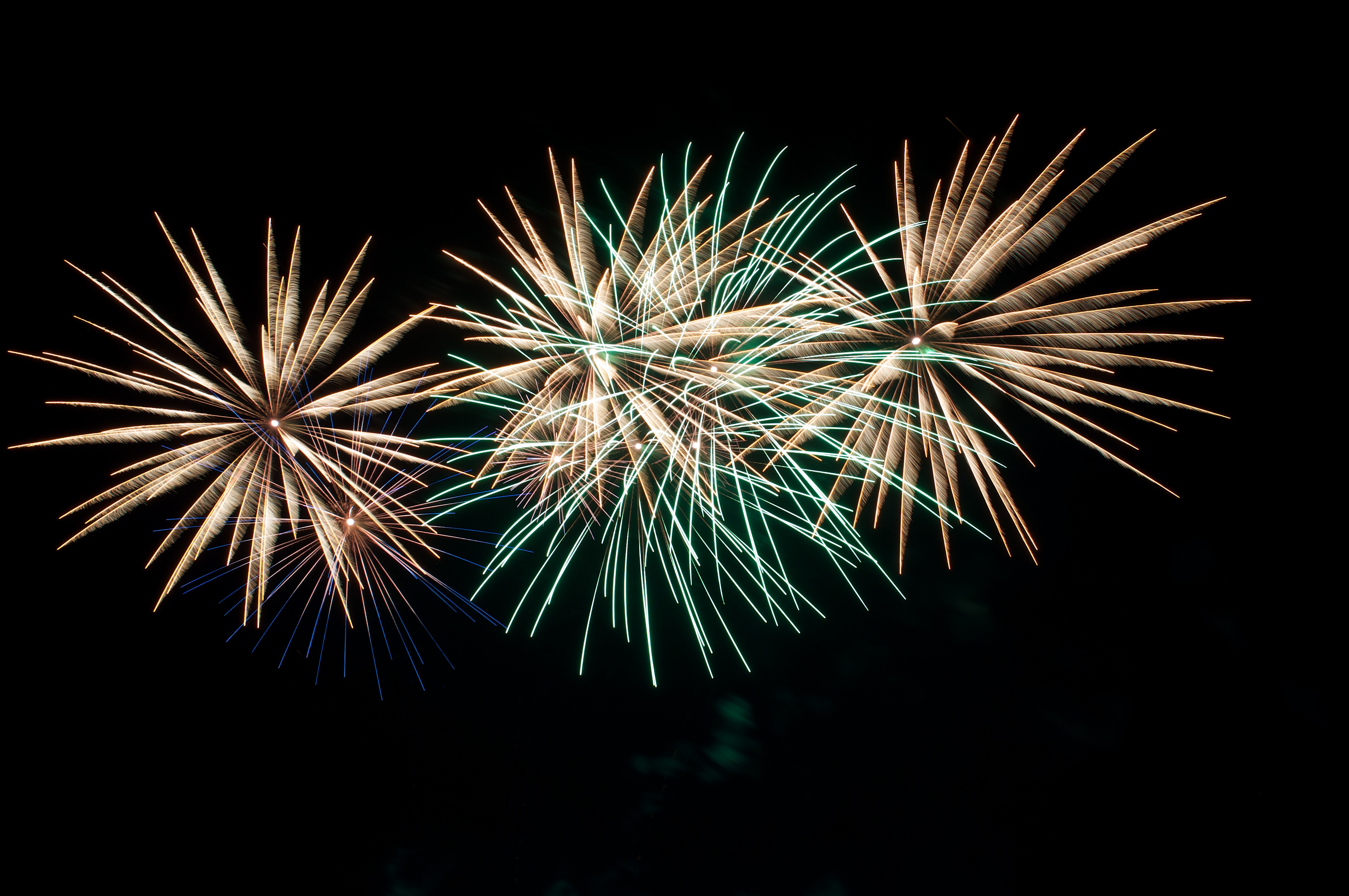
Fireworks show in Malahide, 18 March 2012

In the Republic of Ireland, only category F1 fireworks (such as sparklers) are available for sale, possession and use to amateurs. This makes Ireland one of the strictest countries in the world when it comes to consumer fireworks.

The original law banning ordinary citizens from the purchase of fireworks, the Explosives Act 1875, was adopted when the whole island was still part of the United Kingdom. Subsequent amendments and additional acts were passed to make the policy even stricter. For example, because the 1875 Act did not contain a provision on the possession of fireworks, the law was amended in 2006 to ban amateurs from owning fireworks as well. A person selling, buying, owning or lighting fireworks from categories F2 to F4 without a licence is now punishable with a fine or even imprisonment. Only pyrotechnicians are allowed to ignite such heavier fireworks.

=== Sweden ===
In the early 21st century, Sweden introduced more stringent rules on the use and sales of fireworks. In 2002, firecrackers were banned and in 2014, heavier rockets were banned. In late December 2018, it was announced that from 1 June 2019, skyrockets need to be launched with "control sticks", and anyone buying and lighting skyrockets must complete a special training course set up by the municipalities to obtain a permit; retailers may only sell skyrockets to permit holders. The illegal import and online sale of fireworks were anticipated problems of the new regulations.

Since 2022 there’s a movement in Sweden that’s organized under Riksföreningen Stoppa Fyrverkerier för Privatpersoner i Sverige (The National Association Stop Fireworks for Private Citizens in Sweden) that works to ban people without training and license to use any fireworks or products like that, except for example sparklers and items like that from the category F1.

=== Czech Republic ===
According to 2015 law it is illegal to fire fireworks with more than ten kilograms of explosives at a time without license. Under the ten kilogram threshold the object is not considered a firework (de jure), and the law does not impose any other limitation; no report or permission is needed. For more than ten kilos of fireworks, license and report to the municipal office and a fire brigade is obligatory. The fine for non-compliance is up to half a million crowns, the maximum is higher for companies at a million crowns.

== Candidate member state policies ==
=== Ukraine ===
The process of the accession of Ukraine to the European Union was initiated in early 2022 after the full-scale Russian invasion of Ukraine began on 24 February 2022. On 5 June 2022, President Volodymyr Zelenskyy instructed the Cabinet of Ministers to consider a ban on firecrackers and fireworks during martial law; however, the deputies in the Verkhovna Rada (Parliament of Ukraine) decided that restrictions on the use of pyrotechnics would remain relevant even after the war. A few weeks later on 23 June, the Kyiv City Council prohibited the sale and launch of fireworks in the Ukrainian capital city for the duration of the war, while also ordering all vehicles in the city to use a muffler. On 16 August 2022, the Verkhovna Rada in principle agreed to a draft law banning the sale and use of fireworks and firecrackers throughout Ukraine. On 11 April 2023, Parliament adopted draft law No. 7438, which strengthened control over the use and circulation of pyrotechnic products throughout the country as a whole. Exceptions included stage pyrotechnics of the T1, T2, and F1 classes, which have low noise levels; and pyrotechnics used by the Armed Forces of Ukraine (ZSU), the police, and rescuers.

== See also ==
- Directive (EU) 2021/555
- Fireworks law in the United Kingdom
- Fireworks policy of the United States
