= Alexander M. Mood =

American statistician and operations researcher (1913–2009)

Alexander McFarlane Mood (May 31, 1913 – April 26, 2009) was an American statistician and operations researcher, known for his work in statistical theory and education, and for his leadership roles in professional societies.

== Early life and education ==
Mood was born and grew up in Amarillo, Texas. He earned a Bachelor of Science degree (1934) at the University of Texas at Austin, where he learned mathematics from Robert Lee Moore. After teaching applied mathematics for a couple of years at University of Texas at Austin, and after a year of graduate studies at Brown University, he joined the mathematics department at Princeton University where he earned his Ph.D. (1940) in statistics, under the tutelage of Samuel S. Wilks.

== Career ==
During World War II, Mood worked for the Office of Price Administration at the Bureau of Labor Statistics and for the Applied Mathematics Panel of the National Defense Research Council.

After the war, Mood moved to Ames, Iowa to join what was then the Iowa State University Statistics Laboratory that had been founded by George W. Snedecor in 1933. In 1947, Mood became one of the first faculty members of the Department of Statistics. It was while he was at Iowa State University that he wrote his classic textbook, Introduction to the Theory of Statistics. He was elected as a fellow of the American Statistical Association while at Iowa State University.

In 1950, Mood joined the RAND Corporation in Santa Monica, California. He worked in the mathematics department under John Williams, who was an advocate for the use of operations research to address a number of real-world problems. After five years at RAND, Mood founded General Analysis Corporation (GAC), that provided research services to government agencies, including the United States Army Signal Corps, the U.S. Army Chemical Corps and the National Security Agency. GAC grew to include 17 full- and part-time statisticians and was eventually sold to CEIR, Inc.

In 1965, Mood was hired by the United States Office of Education as Assistant Commissioner. There, he founded National Center for Educational Statistics, where he directed a large survey of schools and colleges to assess the effectiveness of grants issued to schools in areas of high percentage of students from low-income families under Title I of the Elementary and Secondary Education Act. That survey resulted in the controversial Coleman report.

In 1967, Mood returned to academia, joining University of California, Irvine as professor of management. His research there concerned efficiency of management methods in higher education. He remained at UC Irvine until his retirement in 1975.

Mood served as president of the Institute of Mathematical Statistics (1957) and the Operations Research Society of America (1963). In 1979, he was recognized with the Wilks Memorial Award of the American Statistical Association ... for his many significant contributions to the theory of statistics, an outstanding textbook on the subject, his extensive applications to operations and systems analysis, and unique statistical assessments of education and public policy research.

== Personal life ==
Mood was twice married. His first wife was Harriett Harper to whom he was married for over 60 years and with whom he had three children. His second wife was Marion Elsa Vester.

Mood died on April 26, 2009 in Orange County, California when he was 95 years old.

== Books ==
=== Education ===
- Papers on Efficiency in the Management of Higher Education. Berkeley, California: Carnegie Commission on Higher Education. 1972.
- The Future of Higher Education: Some Speculations and Suggestions. New York: McGraw-Hill Companies. 1973. ISBN 978-0-07-010064-0.

=== Policy ===
- Introduction to Policy Analysis. London: Arnold. 1983. ISBN 978-0-7131-3473-5.

Martinich, Joseph S. (1984). "Introduction to Policy Analysis Alexander M. Mood". Interfaces. 14 (2). INFORMS: 98–100. ISSN 0092-2102. JSTOR 25060556.
Fairley, William (1986). "Review of Introduction to Policy Analysis, by A. M. Mood". Journal of the American Statistical Association. 81 (395): 873. doi:10.2307/2289046. JSTOR 2289046.
Golden, Bruce L.; Wasil, Edward A. (1983). "Review of Introduction to Policy Analysis., by A. M. Mood". Journal of the American Statistical Association. 78 (382): 496. doi:10.2307/2288668. JSTOR 2288668.

=== Statistics ===
- The Distribution Theory of Runs (Ph.D. thesis). Princeton University. 1940.

"The Distribution Theory of Runs" (PDF). The Annals of Mathematical Statistics. 11 (4). Institute of Mathematical Statistics: 367–392. 1940. Bibcode:1940AnnMS..11..367M. doi:10.1214/aoms/1177731825. ISSN 0003-4851. JSTOR 2235718.

- Introduction to the Theory of Statistics. Ames, Iowa: Department of Statistics, Iowa State College. 1948. LCCN 50006421. OCLC 966845.

Reviews of 1st edition

McMillen, Wayne (1950). "Introduction to the Theory of Statistics . Alexander M. Mood". Social Service Review. 24 (4): 541. doi:10.1086/638067. ISSN 0037-7961.
Wolfowitz, Jacob (1951). "Review of Introduction to the Theory of Statistics, by A. M. Mood". The American Mathematical Monthly. 58 (5): 352. doi:10.2307/2307742. JSTOR 2307742.
Rutherford, R. S. G. (1951). "Review of Introduction to the Theory of Statistics, by Alexander M. Mood". The Australian Quarterly. 23 (1): 124. doi:10.2307/20633337. JSTOR 20633337.
Stephan, Frederick F. (1951). "Review of Introduction to the Theory of Statistics, by A. M. Mood". The American Economic Review. 41 (3). American Economic Association: 450–451. ISSN 0002-8282. JSTOR 1802129.

- with Graybill, Franklin A. (1963). Introduction to the Theory of Statistics (Second ed.). New York, N.Y.: McGraw-Hill.

Reviews of 2nd edition

Dunteman, George H. (1966). "Book Reviews : Introduction to the Theory of Statistics by Alexander M. Mood and Franklin A. Graybill. New York: McGraw-Hill Book Company, 1963. Pp. xv + 443. $8.95". Educational and Psychological Measurement. 26 (3): 777–779. doi:10.1177/001316446602600333. ISSN 0013-1644.
Graesser, R. F. (1952). "Review of Introduction to the Theory of Statistics". Mathematics Magazine. 25 (5): 273–274. doi:10.2307/3029359. ISSN 0025-570X. JSTOR 3029359.
Birch, John J. (1964). "Review of Introduction to the Theory of Statistics., by A. M. Mood & F. A. Graybill". SIAM Review. 6 (4). Society for Industrial and Applied Mathematics: 472–473. doi:10.1137/1006110. ISSN 0036-1445. JSTOR 2027985.
Sathe, Y. S. (1965). "Review of Introduction to the Theory of Statistics, by A. M. Mood & F. A. Graybill". Technometrics. 7 (3): 456. doi:10.2307/1266611. JSTOR 1266611.
Rosenblatt, M. (1964). "Review of Introduction to the theory of statistics, by A. M. Mood & F. A. Graybill". Quarterly of Applied Mathematics. 22 (2). Brown University: 167. ISSN 0033-569X. JSTOR 43621256.
David, F. N. (1964). "Review of Introduction to the Theory of Statistics, by A. M. Mood & F. A. Graybill". Biometrika. 51 (3/4): 534. doi:10.2307/2334176. JSTOR 2334176.

- with Graybill, Franklin A.; Boes, Duane C. (1973). Introduction to the Theory of Statistics (PDF) (Third ed.). New York, N.Y.: McGraw-Hill. ISBN 978-0-07-042864-5.

Reviews of the 3rd edition

Kass, Gordon V. (1974). "Review of Introduction to the Theory of Statistics, 3rd ed., by A. M. Mood, F. A. Graybill, & D. C. Boes". Journal of the American Statistical Association. 69 (348): 1050. doi:10.2307/2286195. JSTOR 2286195.
