= Katherine Wallman =

American statistician (died 2024)

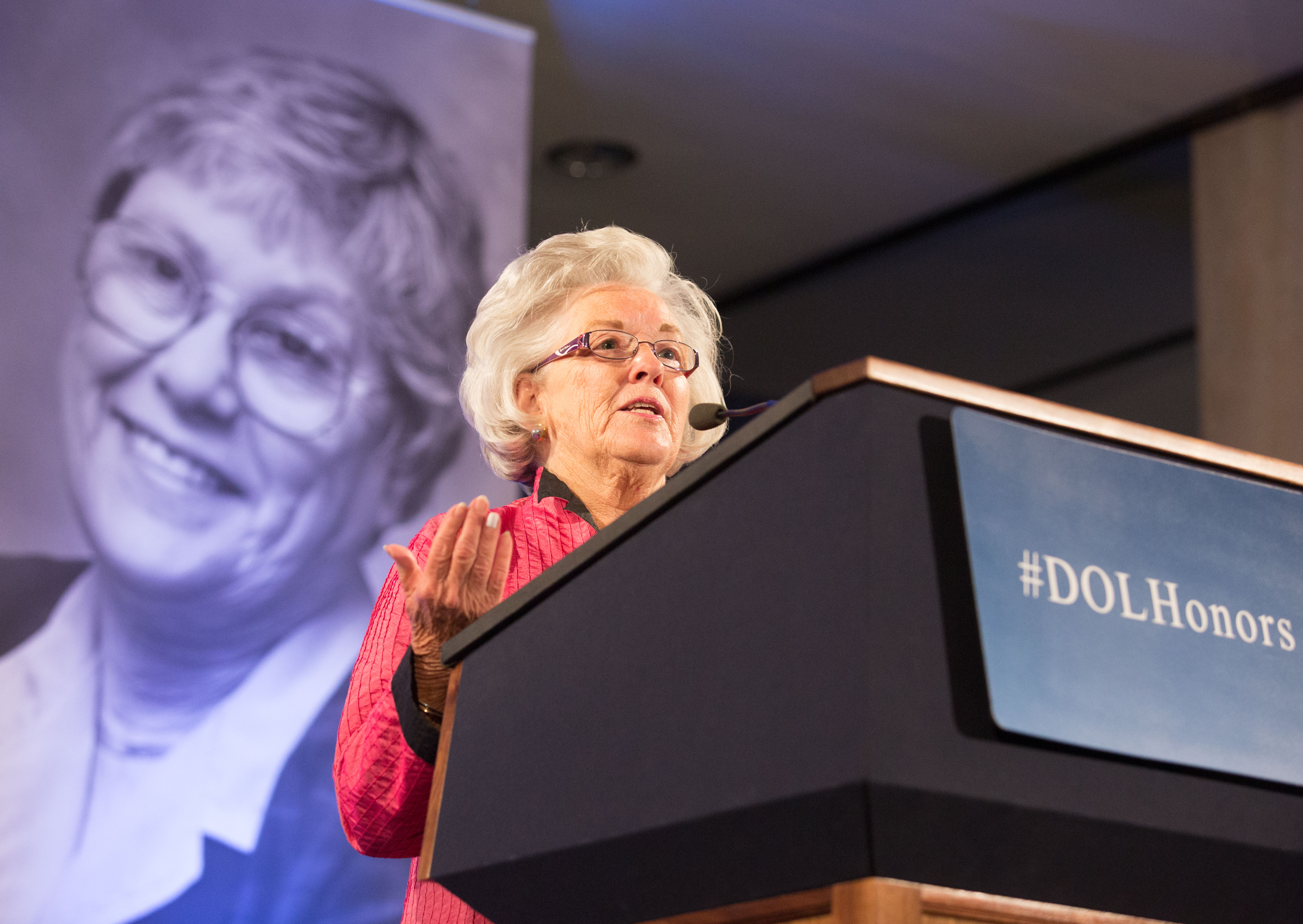
- Wallman in 2015

Chief Statistician of the United States
- In office November 1992 – January 3, 2017
- President: George H. W. Bush; Bill Clinton; George W. Bush; Barack Obama
- Preceded by: Hermann Habermann
- Succeeded by: Nancy Potok

Personal details
- Born: New Jersey, U.S.
- Died: January 17, 2024 (aged 80)
- Education: Wellesley College (BA)

Katherine K. Wallman (June 17, 1943 – January 17, 2024) was an American statistician who served as the chief statistician of the United States from 1992 to 2017. In that role at the U.S. Office of Management and Budget, she provided coordination, guidance, and oversight for the federal statistical system of the United States. She also served as the United States government's representative to international statistical organizations.

== Life ==
Katherine Wallman grew up in New Jersey, the daughter of an elementary school teacher and a telephone company executive. She received a B.A. in sociology from Wellesley College. Her first post-college job was in the telephone industry. She soon moved to the Department of Health, Education, and Welfare in Washington, DC, where she settled at the National Center for Education Statistics, working to strengthen ties between NCES and state education agencies. In 1978, she moved to the Office of Management and Budget (OMB) as deputy chief statistician. The statistical policy office was buffeted during the Carter and Reagan Administrations, and Katherine welcomed the offer from the newly formed Council of Professional Associations on Federal Statistics (COPAFS) to become its first executive director in 1981.

Wallman returned to federal service in 1992 as chief statistician, retiring from that position in early 2017. Highlights include the revision of Statistical Policy Directive No. 15 on race and ethnicity classification in 1997; the enactment of the Confidential Information Protection and Statistical Efficiency Act (CIPSEA) of 2002; the development of guidance from an Interagency Technical Working Group (which she co-chaired) that led to publication of the Supplemental Poverty Measure in 2011; and the issuance of Statistical Policy Directive No. 1 on Fundamental Responsibilities of Federal Statistical Agencies and Recognized Statistical Units in 2014 (now part of the bipartisan Foundations for Evidence-Based Policymaking Act of 2018, along with CIPSEA).

She chaired the United Nations Statistical Commission in 2004–05. and the Conference of European Statisticians, UN Economic Commission for Europe (2003–2007). She also served as vice chair of the OECD Statistics Committee (2009–2011).

Wallman remained active professionally after her retirement, serving on the Council of the Inter-university Consortium for Political and Social Research at the University of Michigan and other boards. She was a doer and a leader in the American Statistical Association (ASA) from early in her career, becoming a fellow in 1983, serving as president in 1992, receiving a Founders Award in 2007, serving on the ASA Scientific and Public Affairs Advisory Committee, and working with the ASA Office of Science Policy on numerous projects in support of federal statistics.

She was twice honored as a Presidential Meritorious Executive and received the Robert G. Damus Award for significant, sustained contributions to the integrity and excellence of OMB (2009). She was an elected member of the International Statistical Institute, a fellow of the American Association for the Advancement of Science, and a founding member of the International Association for Official Statistics. She received the Population Association of America's Excellence in Public Service Award (2011) and the Julius Shiskin Award for Economic Statistics from the Washington Statistical Society and National Association of Business Economists (2017). She made several appearances on C-SPAN.

== Works ==
- Wallman, Katherine K; Harris-Kojetin, Brian A; U.S. Office of Management and Budget, Implementing the Confidential Information Protection and Statistical Efficiency Act of 2002 (PDF), archived from the original (PDF) on March 7, 2013
- Elliott, E., Auerbach, J., Citro, C. F., Elchert, D., Pierson, S., Seastrom, M., Snyder, T., Wallman, K. & Woodworth, J. L. (2024). Bolstering Education Statistics to Serve the Nation. Statistics and Public Policy, 11(1). https://doi.org/10.1080/2330443X.2023.2285788 Retrieved 1-21-2025

== See also ==
- List of presidents of the American Statistical Association
