= United States Commission on Evidence-Based Policymaking =

Government office concerning data-driven decisions

The United States Commission on Evidence-Based Policymaking was a 15-member agency in the federal government charged by the United States Congress and the President with examining how government could better use its existing data to provide evidence for future government decisions.

The Commission was created in March 2016 by the Evidence-Based Policymaking Commission Act (P.L. 114-140), legislation jointly filed by Speaker of the House Paul Ryan (R-WI) and Senator Patty Murray (D-WA). Over the subsequent 18 months after the law's enactment, the Commission engaged in fact-finding and deliberations that involved consideration of evidence from a survey of more than 200 federal agencies, testimony from more than 50 individuals, and additional written comments from 350 individuals. The commission also received feedback from President Barack Obama's administration.

On September 7, 2017, the Commission issued its final report, "The Promise of Evidence-Based Policymaking" which outlined a vision for "a future in which rigorous evidence is created efficiently, as a routine part of government operations, and used to construct effective public policy." The final report includes findings and 22 recommendations for the President and Congress that were unanimously agreed to by the members of the Commission. The Commission outlined three overarching themes about improving access to data, strengthening privacy protections, and ensuring the capacity to generate and use evidence is present in government. In line with each of the three themes, the commission's recommendations include strategies for modifying federal laws affecting data use, establishing a National Secure Data Service to engage in data linkage activities, instituting processes to improve data access and transparency, and designating leadership positions to support evidence generation and use in government.

== Implementing the Commission Recommendations ==
On September 28, 2017, the Committee on Oversight and Government Reform in the U.S. House of Representatives heard testimony from four commissioners: Chair Katharine G. Abraham, Co-Chair Ron Haskins, Commissioner Robert Shea, and Commissioner Latanya Sweeney.

=== Foundations for Evidence-Based Policymaking Act (Evidence Act) ===
In October 2017, Speaker Ryan and Senator Murray jointly filed the Foundations for Evidence-Based Policymaking Act, intended to implement half of the Commission's recommendations. The legislation, collectively referred to as the Evidence Act, includes three major subtitles that address capacity, open data, and data sharing. The second title is also referred to as the OPEN Government Data Act (OGDA) and the third title is also referred to as the Confidential Information Protection and Statistical Efficiency Act (CIPSEA).

The House bill was marked up by the House Committee on Oversight and Government Reform on November 2, 2017, and voted out of the House under suspension on November 15, 2017. While waiting for Senate action on the legislation, in 2018, the administration of President Donald Trump indicated its support for the commission's vision and indicated steps that were being taken to implement some of the Commission recommendations.

In September 2018, the Bipartisan Policy Center hosted a one-year anniversary event called "Evidence: A Time to Act" that featured keynote remarks from Margaret Weichert, the deputy director for management at the U.S. Office of Management and Budget. In conjunction with the event, the co-chairs of the commission called on Congress to advance legislation implementing their recommendations.

In December 2018, the Senate passed a modified version of the legislation and the House of Representatives subsequently concurred in the amendments. On January 14, 2019, President Donald Trump signed the Foundations for Evidence-Based Policymaking Act ("Evidence Act") into law as Public Law 115-435. The new law was described as the most comprehensive data reforms in a generation and an "enormous step" for evidence-based policymaking. The Evidence Act takes steps to promote data accessibility and enable responsible data use, including by creating chief data officers, evaluation officers, and statistics officials at agencies across the federal government.

=== Federal Data Strategy ===
On June 4, 2019, the White House Office of Management and Budget issued the Federal Data Strategy, outlining a set of principles and practices federal agencies are expected to adhere to over the next decade. The Federal Data Strategy is considered one of the implementation vehicles for the Evidence Act and the Evidence Commission's recommendations. An earlier draft version of the strategy received extensive public comments from federal agencies and non-governmental organizations like the Data Coalition and the Bipartisan Policy Center.

In June 2019, the Trump Administration also released a draft action plan, describing a set of 16 actions agencies are expected to undertake in 2019-2020. The plan was referred to by one expert as "a promising start to recognizing government data as a strategic asset." A public forum was held on July 8, 2019, co-hosted by the White House's Office of Management and Budget and the Data Coalition, to solicit additional feedback on the draft action plan from more than 50 commenters. A final action plan was published in early 2020.

In late 2021, the Joe Biden Administration published a new action plan, continuing the initiative launched during the prior administration.

=== National Secure Data Service (NSDS) Act ===
Legislation to address the Evidence Commission's headline recommendation was filed by Congressman Don Beyer (D-VA) in May 2021, establishing the National Secure Data Service at the National Science Foundation. According to the Data Coalition, which endorsed the bill, the proposal aligns with the Evidence Commission recommendations. The legislation was subsequently attached to the National Science for the Future Act, which passed the U.S. House of Representatives on June 28, 2021 with a 345-67 vote. While action was pending in the U.S. Senate on the legislation, the Evidence Commission Co-Chairs endorsed the proposal on November 30, 2021 and called for its passage.

In July 2022, the U.S. Senate attached the NSDS Act to the bipartisan CHIPs and Science Act of 2022 which passed the Senate with a 64-33 vote and the House with a 243-187 vote. The Data Coalition applauded congressional passage of the legislation and described it as an "innovation" for the federal data ecosystem. President Biden signed the CHIPS and Science Act on August 9, 2022 (P.L. 117-167).

The National Science Foundation is currently implementing the National Secure Data Service as a demonstration project, with an anticipated full-scale launch in 2027. On April 30, 2025, NSF published seven new requests for proposals through America's DataHub to support the NSDS, focusing on topics like fraud prevention and state data sharing. Notably, the NSDS is also in coordination with the National AI Research Resource Pilot.

== Progress Reports on Commission Recommendations ==
On September 7, 2019, the Data Coalition issued a two-year update summarizing the achievements made in law and policy for addressing the Commission's recommendations, indicating "substantial progress" had been made on the recommendations.

Former House Speaker Paul Ryan described next steps in addressing the Commission's recommendations during keynote remarks at the Data Coalition's govDATAx Summit on October 30, 2019. In September 2021, Ryan called for support of the NSDS Act during a segment on Government Matters facilitated by the Data Coalition.

At the 4-year mark following the Commission's report to Congress and the President, the Data Foundation reported that substantial progress had been made to achieve the Commission's vision. The Data Foundation and Bipartisan Policy Center hosted an event to mark the 5-year anniversary on September 13, 2022, including experts from the Commission and civil society. A 5-year progress report published by the Data Foundation noted substantial progress on implementation with some remaining gaps on several recommendations.

In October 2022, the Federal Advisory Committee on Data for Evidence Building, established by the Evidence Act, also issued its final report with recommendations about how to further extend the impact of the Commission recommendations.

In June 2024, the Data Foundation issued a study on the implementation of learning agendas, or evidence-building plans required by the Evidence Act.

== Commission Members ==
The initial members of the commission were:

- Katharine G. Abraham, Chair, Professor of Economics and Survey Methodology at the University of Maryland, College Park
- Ron Haskins, Co-Chair, Cabot Family Chair in Economic Studies at the Brookings Institution
- Sherry Glied, Dean of New York University's Robert F. Wagner Graduate School of Public Service
- Hilary Hoynes, Professor of Economics and Public Policy, University of California, Berkeley
- Paul Ohm, Professor of Law at the Georgetown University Law Center
- Robert Shea, principal and currently the CEO of Government Navigators
- Kim Wallin, accountant for D.K. Wallin Ltd.
- Robert Groves, Provost of Georgetown University
- Jeffrey Liebman, Malcolm Wiener Professor of Public Policy at the Harvard Kennedy School
- Allison Orris, former Associate Administrator of the Office of Information and Regulatory Affairs, U.S. Office of Management and Budget
- Latanya Sweeney, Professor of Government and Technology in Residence at Harvard University
- Robert Hahn, Professor and Director of Economics at the Smith School of Enterprise and the Environment, University of Oxford
- Bruce Meyer, McCormick Foundation Professor at the Harris School of Public Policy, University of Chicago
- Kathleen Rice, Counsel at Faegre Baker Daniels
- Kenneth Troske, Associate Dean for Graduate Programs and Outreach, University of Kentucky

Allison Orris departed the commission on January 20, 2017 and was replaced by Nancy Potok, former Chief Statistician of the United States.

== Commission Staff ==
The Evidence Commission was supported by 10 full-time staff provided for short-term assignments from other federal agencies:

- Sharon Boivin, Ph.D., Senior Policy and Research Analyst
- Anne Fletcher, Senior Policy and Research Analyst
- Nick Hart, Ph.D., Policy and Research Director
- Lucas Hitt, Deputy Director
- Kristy Howell, Senior Policy and Research Analyst
- Shelly Wilkie Martinez, Executive Director
- Mary McKoy, External Affairs Chief
- Kathryn McNamara, Library and Records Coordinator
- Sara Stefanik, Policy and Research Analyst
- Robin Wyvill, Meetings and Events Coordinator
