= Lisa Mirel =

American government statistician

Lisa B. Mirel is an American statistician who works as a statistical advisor to the National Center for Science and Engineering Statistics, a division of the National Science Foundation and part of the Federal Statistical System of the United States. She is president-elect of the Washington Statistical Society for 2025–2026 and will be president for the 2026–2027 term.

== Early life and education ==
Mirel is one of the children of Jeffrey Mirel, a scholar of education who held the David L. Angus Collegiate Chair at the University of Michigan School of Education. She has a bachelor's degree from Washington University in St. Louis, and a master's degree in biostatistics from the University of Michigan.

== Career ==
Mirel has worked as a statistician for the Centers for Medicare & Medicaid Services, Agency for Healthcare Research and Quality, and United States Government Accountability Office. In the Centers for Disease Control and Prevention, she worked in the Division of Parasitic Diseases and in the Division of Health and Nutrition Examination Surveys of the National Center for Health Statistics (NCHS). She became chief of the NCHS Special Projects Branch in the Office of Analysis and Epidemiology and director of the NCHS Data Linkage program, and later chief of the NCHS Data Linkage Methodology and Analysis Branch, before taking her present position at the National Center for Science and Engineering Statistics.

== Recognition ==
Mirel was the recipient of the 2021 Links Lecture Award, given annually by the American Statistical Association for contributions to official statistics. She was elected as a Fellow of the American Statistical Association in 2026.
