= Race and ethnicity in the United States census =

Self-identification collected by the US census

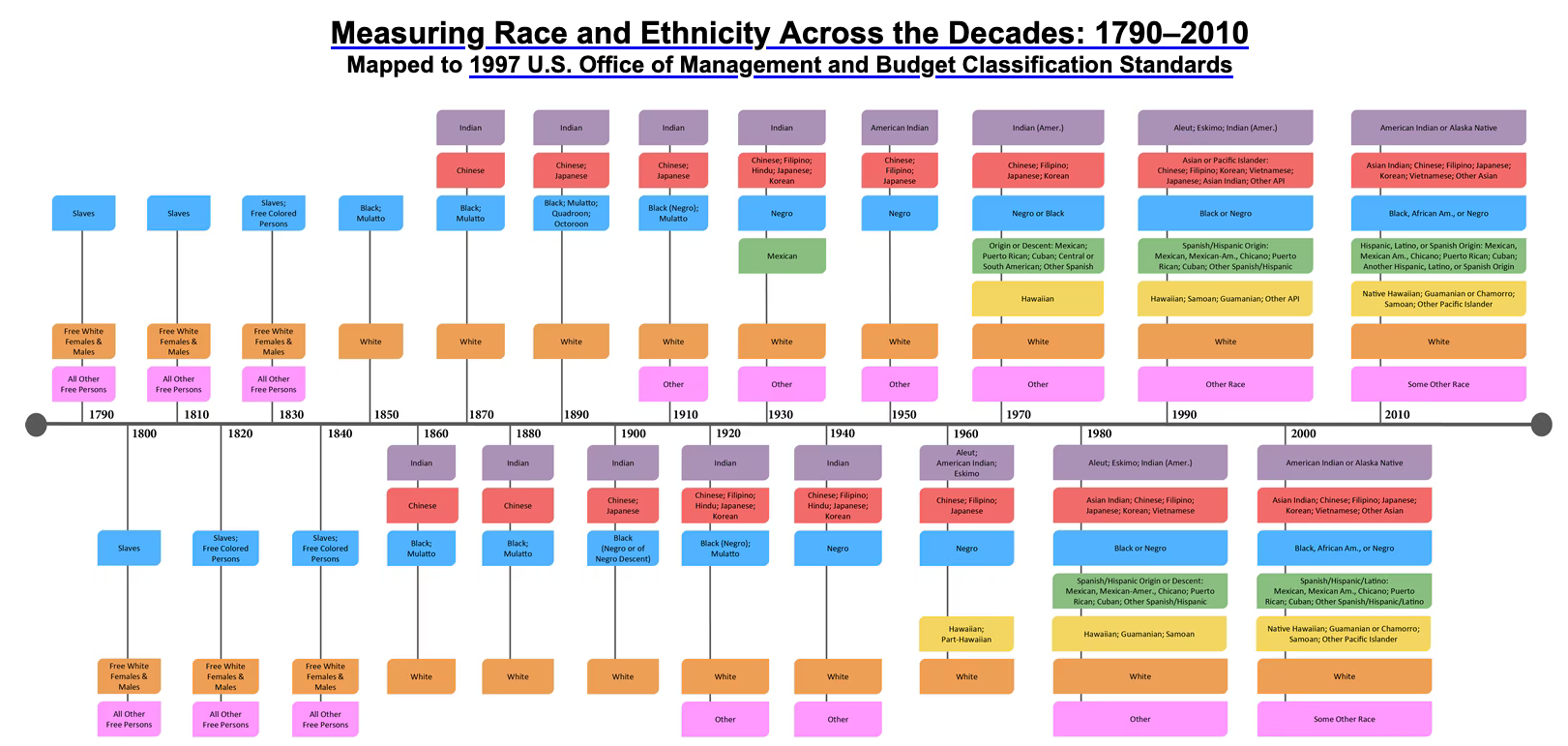
Measuring Race and Ethnicity Across the Decades: 1790–2010 United States Censuses. The exact terminology of racial groups changes over time.

In the United States census, the U.S. Census Bureau and the Office of Management and Budget (OMB) define a set of self-identified categories of race and ethnicity chosen by residents, with which they most closely identify. Residents can indicate their origins alongside their race, and are asked specifically whether they are of Hispanic or Latino origin in a separate question.

Race and ethnicity are considered separate and distinct identities, with a person's origins considered in the census. Racial categories in the United States represent a social-political construct for the race or races that respondents consider themselves to be and, "generally reflect a social definition of race recognized in this country". The OMB defines the concept of race as outlined for the census to be not "scientific or anthropological", and takes into account "social and cultural characteristics as well as ancestry", using "appropriate scientific methodologies" that are not "primarily biological or genetic in reference." The race categories include both racial and national-origin groups.

From the first United States census in 1790 to the 1960 census, the government's census enumerators chose a person's race. Racial categories changed over time, with different groups being added and removed with each census. Since the 1970 census, Americans provide their own racial self-identification. This change was due to the reforms brought about by the Civil Rights Act of 1964 and the Voting Rights Act of 1965, which required more accurate census data. Since the 1980 census, in addition to their race or races, all respondents are categorized by membership in one of two ethnic categories, which are "Hispanic or Latino" and "Not Hispanic or Latino." This practice of separating "race" and "ethnicity" as different categories has been criticized both by the American Anthropological Association and members of US Commission on Civil Rights.

Since the 2000 census, Americans have been able to identify as more than one race. In 1997, the OMB issued a Federal Register notice regarding revisions to the standards for the classification of federal data on race and ethnicity. The OMB developed race and ethnic standards in order to provide "consistent data on race and ethnicity throughout the federal government". The development of the data standards stem in large measure from new responsibilities to enforce civil rights laws. Among the changes, The OMB issued the instruction to "mark one or more races" after noting evidence of increasing numbers of mixed-race children and wanting to record diversity in a measurable way after having received requests by people who wanted to be able to acknowledge theirs and their children's full ancestry, rather than identifying with only one group. Prior to this decision, the census and other government data collections asked people to report singular races.

As of 2023, the OMB built on the 1997 guidelines and suggested the addition of a Middle Eastern or North African (MENA) racial category and considered combining racial and ethnic categories into one question. In March 2024, the Office of Management and Budget published revisions to Statistical Policy Directive No. 15: Standards for Maintaining, Collecting, and Presenting Federal Data on Race and Ethnicity that included a combined question and a MENA category, while also collecting additional detail to enable data disaggregation.

== Data on race and ethnicity ==
The OMB states, "many federal programs are put into effect based on the race data obtained from the decennial census (i.e., promoting equal employment opportunities; assessing racial disparities in health and environmental risks). Race data is also critical for the basic research behind many policy decisions. States require this data to meet legislative redistricting requirements. The data is needed to monitor compliance with the Voting Rights Act by local jurisdictions".

Data on ethnic groups are important for putting into effect a number of federal statutes (i.e., enforcing bilingual election rules under the Voting Rights Act and monitoring/enforcing equal employment opportunities under the Civil Rights Act). Data on ethnic groups is also needed by local governments to run programs and meet legislative requirements (i.e., identifying segments of the population who may not be receiving medical services under the Public Health Service Act; evaluating whether financial institutions are meeting the credit needs of minority populations under the Community Reinvestment Act).

== History ==
External image
- "Government Collection of Race and Ethnicity Data", Center for American Progress, February 6, 2015. An illustrated history of the racial and ethnic categories used in the US census from 1790 through 2010.

=== 18th and 19th centuries ===
==== 1790 census ====
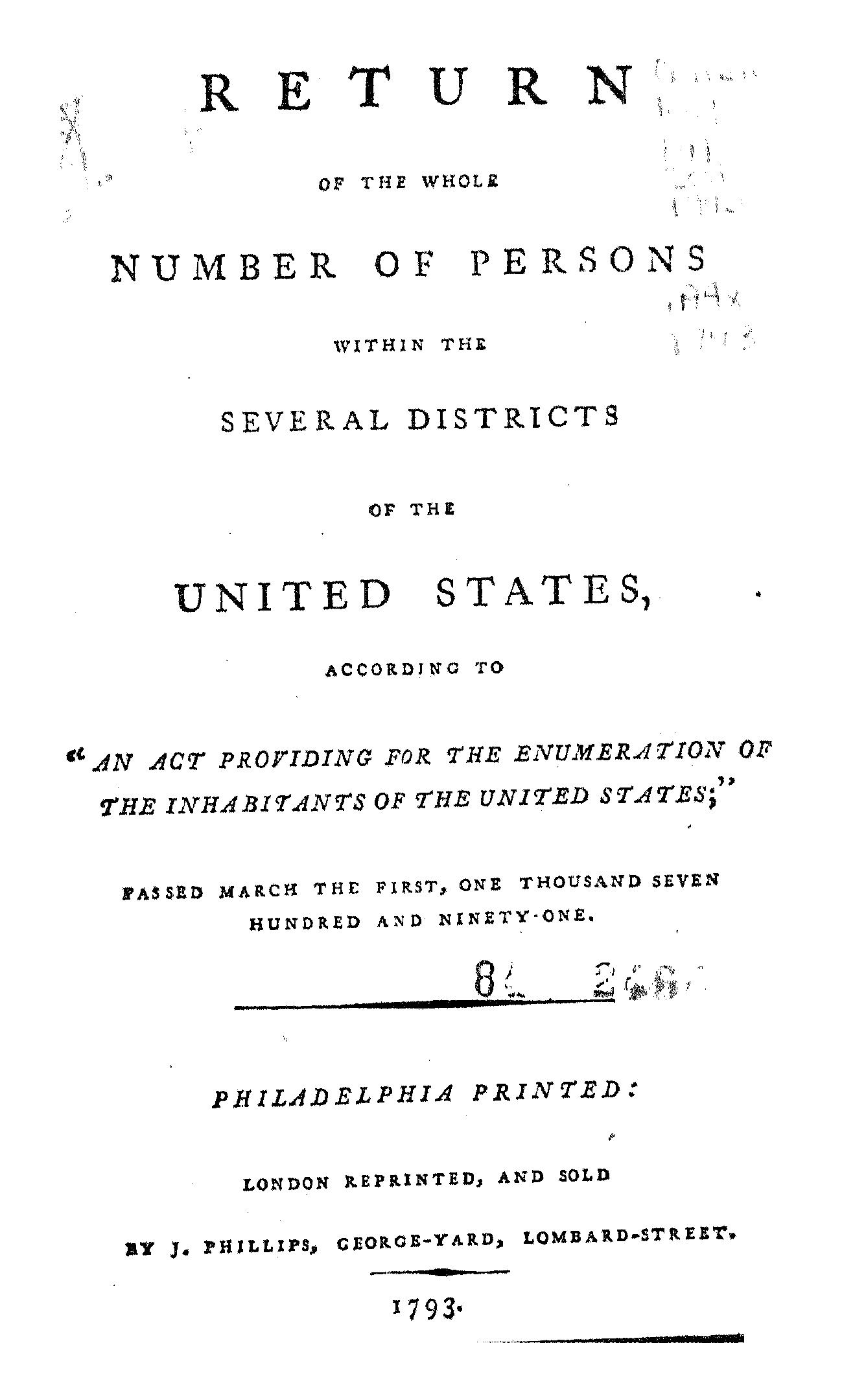
Title page of 1790 United States census

The 1790 United States census was the first census in the history of the United States. The population of the United States was recorded as 3,929,214 as of Census Day, August 2, 1790, as mandated by Article I, Section 2 of the US Constitution and applicable laws.

The law required that every household be visited, that completed census schedules be posted in two of the most public places within each jurisdiction, remain for the inspection of all concerned, and that "the aggregate amount of each description of persons" for every district be transmitted to the president. The US Marshals were also responsible for governing the census.

===== Loss of data =====
About one-third of the original census data has been lost or destroyed since documentation. The data was lost in 1790–1830, and included data from Connecticut, Delaware, Georgia, Maine, Maryland, Massachusetts, New Hampshire, New Jersey, New York, North Carolina, Pennsylvania, Rhode Island, South Carolina, Vermont, and Virginia. However, the census was proven factual and the existence of most of this data can be confirmed in many secondary sources pertaining to the first census.

===== Data =====
Census data included the name of the head of the family and categorized inhabitants as: free white males at least 16 years of age (to assess the country's industrial and military potential), free white males under 16 years of age, free white females, all other free persons (reported by sex and color), and slaves. Thomas Jefferson, then the Secretary of State, directed US Marshals to collect data from all 13 original states, and from the Southwest Territory. The census was not conducted in Vermont until 1791, after that state's admission to the Union as the 14th state on March 4 of that year.

District	Free white males at least 16 years of age, including heads of families	Free white males under 16 years	Free white females, including heads of families	All other free persons	Slaves	Total
Vermont	22,435	22,328	40,505	271	0 (Note: The census of 1790, published in 1791, reports 16 slaves in Vermont. Subsequently, and up to 1860, the number is given as 17. An examination of the original manuscript allegedly shows that no slaves were ever in Vermont. The original error occurred in preparing the results for publication, when 16 persons, returned as "Free colored", were carried forward to the following page as "Slave". See Lyman Simpson Hayes (1929). The Connecticut River Valley in southern Vermont and New Hampshire; historical sketches. Rutland, Vermont, Tuttle Co. pp. 276–278. for details.)	85,539 (Note: Corrected figures are 85,425, or 114 less than the figures published in 1790, due to an error of addition in the returns for each of the towns of Fairfield, Milton, Shelburne, and Williston, in the county of Chittenden; Brookfield, Newbury, Randolph, and Strafford, in the county of Orange; Castleton, Clarendon, Hubbardton, Poultney, Rutland, Shrewsburg, and Wallingford, in the county of Rutland; Dummerston, Guilford, Halifax, and Westminster, in the county of Windham; and Woodstock, in the county of Windsor.)
New Hampshire	36,086	34,851	70,160	630	158	141,885
Maine	24,384	24,748	46,870	538	0	96,540
Massachusetts	95,453	87,289	190,582	5,463	0	378,787 (Note: The figures for Massachusetts do not include the population of Maine. Though Maine was then a part of Massachusetts, the Maine figures were compiled separately, and are shown on the line for Maine.)
Rhode Island	16,019	15,799	32,652	3,407	948	68,825
Connecticut	60,523	54,403	117,448	2,808	2,764	237,946
New York	83,700	78,122	152,320	4,654	21,324	340,120
New Jersey	45,251	41,416	83,287	2,762	11,423	184,139
Pennsylvania	110,788	106,948	206,363	6,537	3,737	434,373
Delaware	11,783	12,143	22,384	3,899	8,887	59,094 (Note: Corrected figures are 59,096, or 2 more than figures published in 1790, due to error in addition.)
Maryland	55,915	51,339	101,395	8,043	103,036	319,728
Virginia	110,936	116,135	215,046	12,866	292,627	747,610 (Note: The figures for Virginia do not include the population of Kentucky. Though Kentucky was then a part of Virginia, the Kentucky figures were compiled separately, and are shown on the line for Kentucky. The Virginia figures do include the portion of Virginia that later became the state of West Virginia.)
Kentucky	15,154	17,057	28,922	114	12,430	73,677
North Carolina	69,988	77,506	140,710	4,975	100,572	393,751
South Carolina	35,576	37,722	66,880	1,801	107,094	249,073
Georgia	13,103	14,044	25,739	398	29,264	82,548
Total	807,094	791,850	1,541,263	59,150	694,280	3,893,635

===== Contemporary perception =====
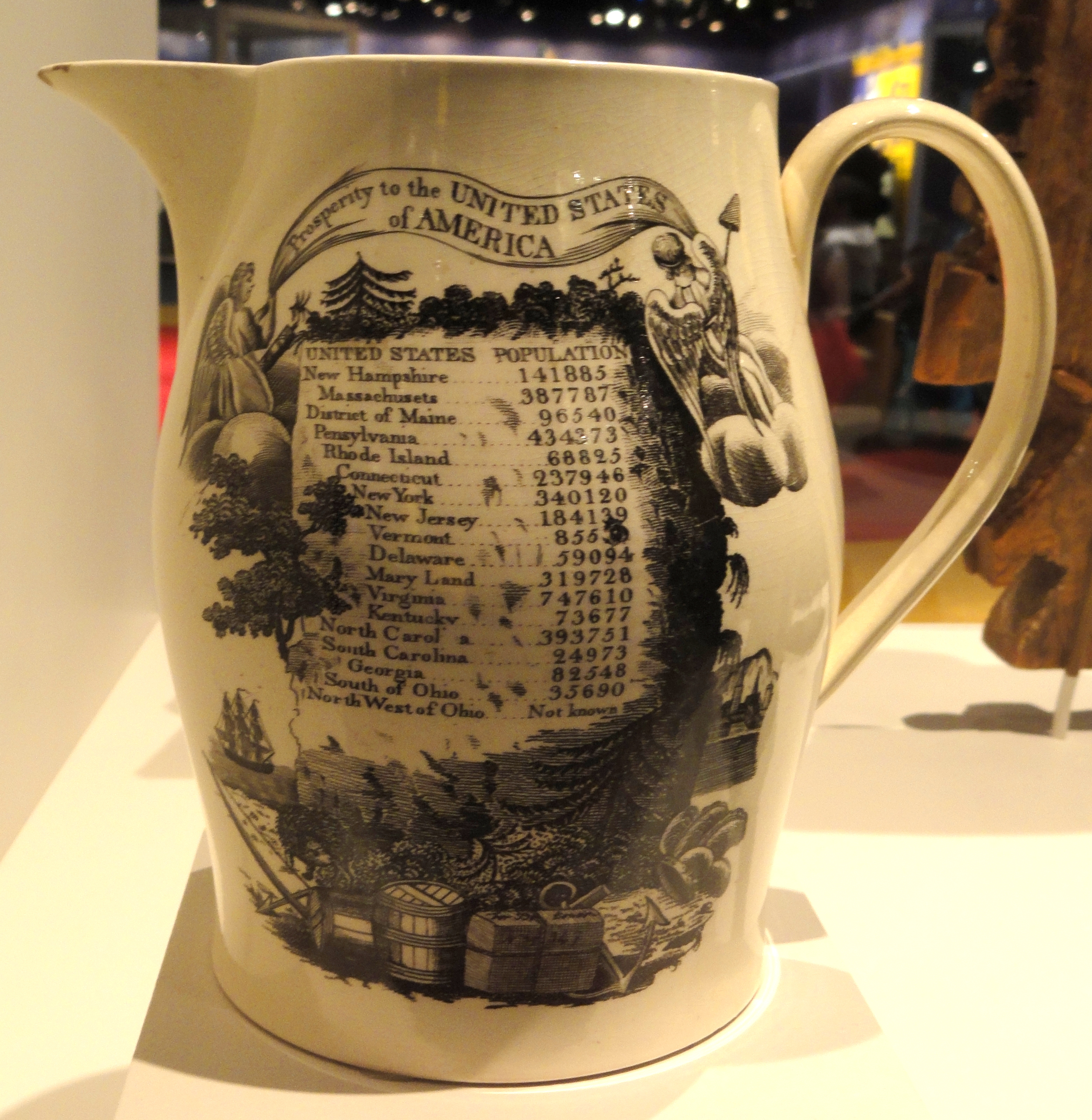
Commemorative pitcher with census results

Some doubt surrounded the numbers, as President George Washington and Thomas Jefferson maintained the population was undercounted. The potential reasons Washington and Jefferson may have thought this could be refusal to participate, poor public transportation and roads, spread-out population, and restraints of current technology.

===== Data availability =====
No microdata from the 1790 population census are available, but aggregate data for small areas and their compatible cartographic boundary files, can be downloaded from the National Historical Geographic Information System. However, the categories of "Free white males" of 16 years and upward, including heads of families under 16 years, "Free white females", including heads of families, All other free persons, and "Slaves," existed in the census form.

==== 1800 and 1810 census ====
In 1800 and 1810, the age question regarding free white males was more detailed with five cohorts and included All other free persons, except "Indians not taxed", and "Slaves".

==== 1820 census ====
The 1820 census built on the questions asked in 1810 by asking age questions about slaves. Also the term "colored" entered the census nomenclature. In addition, a question stating "Number of foreigners not naturalized" was included.

==== 1830 census ====
In the 1830 census, a new question, which stated, "The number of White persons who were foreigners not naturalized" was included.

==== 1840 census ====
The 1840 census was the last census conducted by U.S. marshals. This was due to the Northern members of the Whig Party opposing the controversial claim in the 1840 census that free Black Americans in the Northern United States suffered from a higher degree of "insane" or "idiotic" behavior compared to enslaved Black Americans. Starting in 1850, the Department of the Interior used a specialized census bureau to tabulate the census.

==== 1850 census ====
The 1850 census had a dramatic shift in the way information about residents was collected. For the first time, free persons were listed individually instead of by head of household. Two questionnaires were used – one for free inhabitants and one for slaves. The question on the free inhabitants schedule about color was a column that was to be left blank if a person were white, marked "B" if a person were black, and marked "M" if a person were mulatto. Slaves were listed by owner, and classified by gender and age, not individually, and the question about color was a column that was to be marked with a "B" if the slave were black and an "M" if mulatto.

==== 1890 census ====
For 1890, the Census Office changed the design of the population questionnaire. Residents were still listed individually, but a new questionnaire sheet was used for each family. Additionally, this was the first year that the census distinguished among different Asian ethnic groups, such as Japanese and Chinese, due to increased immigration. This census also marked the beginning of the term "race" in the questionnaires. Enumerators were instructed to write "White", "Black", "Mulatto", "Quadroon", "Octoroon", "Chinese", "Japanese", or "Indian".

==== 1900 census ====
During 1900, the "Color or Race" question was slightly modified, removing the term "Mulatto". Also, there was an inclusion of an "Indian Population Schedule" in which "enumerators were instructed to use a special expanded questionnaire for American Indians living on reservations or in family groups off of reservations." This expanded version included the question "Fraction of person's lineage that is white."

=== 20th century ===
==== 1910 census ====
The 1910 census was similar to that of 1900, but it included a reinsertion of "Mulatto" and a question about the "mother tongue" of foreign-born individuals and individuals with foreign-born parents. "Ot" was also added to signify "other races", with space for a race to be written in. This decade's version of the Indian Population Schedule featured questions asking the individual's proportion of white, black, or American Indian lineage.

==== 1920 census ====
The 1920 census questionnaire was similar to 1910, but excluded a separate schedule for American Indians. "Hin", "Kor", and "Fil" were also added to the "Color or Race" question, signifying Hindu (Asian Indian), Korean, and Filipino, respectively.

==== 1930 census ====
The biggest change in this census was in racial classification. Enumerators were instructed to no longer use the "Mulatto" classification. Instead, they were given special instructions for reporting the race of interracial persons. A person with both white and black ancestry (termed "blood") was to be recorded as "Negro", no matter the fraction of that lineage (the "one-drop rule"). A person of mixed black and American Indian ancestry was also to be recorded as "Neg" (for "Negro") unless they were considered to be "predominantly" American Indian and accepted as such within the community. A person with both white and American Indian ancestry was to be recorded as American Indian, unless their Indigenous ancestry was small, and they were accepted as white within the community. In all situations in which a person had white and some other racial ancestry, they were to be reported as that other race. People who had minority interracial ancestry were to be reported as the race of their father.

For the first and only time, "Mexican" was listed as a race. Enumerators were instructed that all people born in Mexico, or whose parents were born in Mexico, should be listed as Mexicans, and not under any other racial category. In prior censuses and in 1940, enumerators were instructed to list Mexican Americans as white, perhaps because some of them were of white background (mainly Spanish), many others mixed white and Native American and some of them Native American.

The supplemental American Indian questionnaire was back, but in abbreviated form. It featured a question asking if the person was of full or mixed American Indian ancestry.

==== 1940 census ====
President Franklin D. Roosevelt promoted a Good Neighbor policy that sought better relations with Mexico. In 1935, a federal judge ruled that three Mexican immigrants were ineligible for citizenship because they were not white, as required by federal law. Mexico protested, and Roosevelt decided to circumvent the decision and make sure the federal government treated Hispanics as white. The State Department, the Census Bureau, the Labor Department, and other government agencies therefore made sure to uniformly classify people of Mexican descent as white. This policy encouraged the League of United Latin American Citizens in its quest to minimize discrimination by asserting their whiteness.

The 1940 census was the first to include separate population and housing questionnaires. The race category of "Mexican" was eliminated in 1940, and the population of Mexican descent was counted with the white population.

1940 census data was used for Japanese American internment. The Census Bureau's role was denied for decades, but was finally proven in 2007.

==== 1950 census ====
The 1950 census questionnaire removed the word "color" from the racial question, and also removed Hindu and Korean from the race choices.

==== 1960 census ====
The 1960 census re-added the word "color" to the racial question, and changed "Indian" to "American Indian", as well as adding Hawaiian, Part-Hawaiian, Aleut, and Eskimo. The "Other (print out race)" option was removed.

==== 1970 census ====
This year's census included "Negro or Black", re-added Korean and the Other race option. East Indians (the term used at that time for people whose ancestry is from the Indian subcontinent) were counted as White. There was a questionnaire that was asked of only a sample of respondents. These questions were as follows:

13. a. Where was this person born?
13. b. Is this person's origin or descent...
13. Mexican
13. Puerto Rican
13. Cuban
13. Central or South American
13. Other Spanish
13. None of These
14. What country was the person's father born in?
15. What country was the person's mother born in?
16. a. For persons born in a foreign country – Is the person naturalized?
17. b When did the person come to the United States to stay?
18. What language, other than English, was spoken in the person's home as a child?
19. Spanish
20. French
21. Italian
22. German
23. Other
24. None, only English

Questions on Spanish or Hispanic Origin or Descent

Is this person's origin or descent?

Mexican

Puerto Rican Cuban

Central American Other Spanish

No, none of these

==== 1980 census ====
This year added several options to the race question, including Vietnamese, Indian (East), Guamanian, Samoan, and re-added Aleut. Again, the term "color" was removed from the racial question, and the following questions were asked of a sample of respondents:

11. In what state or foreign country was the person born?
12. If this person was born in a foreign country...
13. a. Is this person a naturalized citizen of the United States?
14. b. When did this person come to the United States to stay?
15. a. Does this person speak a language other than English at home?
16. b. If yes, what is this language?
17. c. If yes, how well does this person speak English?
18. What is this person's ancestry?

Questions on Spanish or Hispanic Origin or Descent

Is this person of Spanish/Hispanic origin or descent?

No, not Spanish/Hispanic

Yes, Mexican, Mexican American, Chicano

Yes, Puerto Rican

Yes, Cuban

Yes, other Spanish/Hispanic

==== 1990 census ====
The racial categories in this year are as they appear in the 2000 and 2010 censuses. The following questions were asked of a sample of respondents for the 1990 census:

8. In what U.S. State or foreign country was this person born?
9. Is this person a citizen of the United States?
10. If this person was not born in the United States, when did this person come to the United States to stay?

The 1990 census was not designed to capture multiple racial responses, and when individuals marked the "other" race option and provided a multiple write-in. The response was assigned according to the race written first. "For example, a write-in of 'black-white' was assigned a code of 'black,' while a write-in of 'white-black' was assigned a code of 'white.'"

Questions on Spanish or Hispanic Origin or Descent

Is this person of Spanish/Hispanic origin?

No, not Spanish/Hispanic

Yes, Mexican, Mexican American, Chicano

Yes, Puerto Rican

Yes, Cuban

Yes, other Spanish/Hispanic, print one group ...

Census data indicate that the number of children in interracial families grew from less than one-half million in 1970 to about two million in 1990. In 1990, for interracial families with one White partner, the other parent was Black for about 20 percent of all children, the other parent was Asian for 45 percent, and the other parent was American Indian and Alaska Native for about 34 percent.

==== 2000 census ====
Race was asked differently in the 2000 census in several other ways than previously. Most significantly, respondents were given the option of selecting one or more race categories to indicate racial identities. Data show that nearly seven million Americans identified as members of two or more races. Because of these changes, the 2000 census data on race are not directly comparable with data from the 1990 census or earlier censuses. Use of caution is therefore recommended when interpreting changes in the racial composition of the US population over time.

The following definitions apply to the 2000 census only.

- White — A person having origins in any of the original peoples of Europe, the Middle East, or North Africa. It includes people who indicate their race as "white-skinned people" or report entries such as Irish, German, Italian, Lebanese, Near Easterner, Arab, or Polish.
- Black or African American — A person having origins in any of the black racial groups of Africa. It includes people who indicate their race as "Black, African Am., or Negro", or provide written entries such as African American, Afro American, Kenyan, Nigerian, or Haitian.
- American Indian and Alaska Native — A person having origins in any of the original peoples of North and South America (including Central America) and who maintain tribal affiliation or community attachment.
- Asian — A person having origins in any of the original peoples of the Far East, Southeast Asia, or the Indian subcontinent including, for example, Cambodia, China, India, Japan, Korea, Malaysia, Pakistan, the Philippine Islands, Thailand, and Vietnam. It includes "Asian Indian", "Chinese", "Filipino", "Korean", "Japanese", "Vietnamese", and "Other Asian".
- Native Hawaiian and Other Pacific Islander — A person having origins in any of the original peoples of Hawaii, Guam, Samoa, or other Pacific Islands. It includes people who indicate their race as "Native Hawaiian", "Guamanian or Chamorro", "Samoan", and "Other Pacific Islander".
- Some other race — Includes all other responses not included in the "White", "Black or African American", "American Indian or Alaska Native", "Asian", and "Native Hawaiian or Other Pacific Islander" race categories described above. Respondents providing write-in entries such as multiracial, mixed, interracial, We-Sort, or a Hispanic/Latino group (for example, Mexican, Puerto Rican, or Cuban) in the "Some other race" category are included here.
- Two or more races — People may have chosen to provide two or more races either by checking two or more race response check boxes, by providing multiple write-in responses, or by some combination of check boxes and write-in responses.

Snapshot: Race in the US census
The 23rd federal census, 2010 asks one ethnic and one race question (questions 1–4 not reproduced here, questions 5 and 6 paraphrased):
8. Is the person of Hispanic, Latino, or Spanish origin?
  - No, not of Hispanic, Latino, or Spanish origin
  - Yes, Mexican, Mexican Am., Chicano
  - Yes, Puerto Rican
  - Yes, Cuban
  - Yes, another Hispanic, Latino, or Spanish origin – Print origin, for example, Argentinian, Colombian, Dominican, Nicaraguan, Salvadoran, Spaniard, and so on.
9. What is the person's race?
  - White
  - Black or African American
  - American Indian or Alaska Native – Print name of enrolled or principal tribe.
  - Asian Indian
  - Chinese
  - Filipino
  - Other Asian – Print race, for example, Hmong, Laotian, Thai, Pakistani, Cambodian, and so on.
  - Japanese
  - Korean
  - Vietnamese
  - Native Hawaiian
  - Guamanian or Chamorro
  - Samoan
  - Other Pacific Islander – Print race, for example, Fijian, Tongan, and so on.
  - Some other race – Print race.

This census acknowledged that "race categories include both racial and national-origin groups."

The federal government of the United States has mandated that "in data collection and presentation, federal agencies are required to use a minimum of two ethnicities: "Hispanic or Latino" and "Not Hispanic or Latino". The Census Bureau defines "Hispanic or Latino" as "a person of Cuban, Mexican, Puerto Rican, South or Central American or other Spanish culture or origin regardless of race."

Use of the word "ethnicity" for Hispanics only is considerably more restricted than its conventional meaning, which covers other distinctions, some of which are covered by the "race" and "ancestry" questions. The distinct questions accommodate the possibility of Hispanic and Latino Americans' also declaring various racial identities (see also White Hispanic and Latino Americans, Black Hispanic and Latino Americans, and Asian Hispanic and Latino Americans).

In the 2000 census, 12.5% of the US population reported "Hispanic or Latino" ethnicity and 87.5% reported "Not-Hispanic or Latino" ethnicity.

=== 21st century ===
==== 2010 census ====
The 2010 census included changes designed to more clearly distinguish Hispanic ethnicity as not being a race. That included adding the sentence: "For this census, Hispanic origins are not races." Additionally, the Hispanic terms were modified from "Hispanic or Latino" to "Hispanic, Latino or Spanish origin".

Although used in the census and the American Community Survey, "Some other race" is not an official race, and the Bureau considered eliminating it prior to the 2000 census. As the 2010 census form did not contain the question titled "Ancestry" found in prior censuses, there were campaigns to get non-Hispanic West Indian Americans, Turkish Americans, Armenian Americans, Arab Americans, and Iranian Americans to indicate their ethnic or national background through the race question, specifically the "Some other race" category.

The Interagency Committee has suggested that the concept of marking multiple boxes be extended to the Hispanic origin question, thereby freeing individuals from having to choose between their parents' ethnic heritages. In other words, a respondent could choose both "Hispanic or Latino" and "Not Hispanic or Latino".

==== 2020 census ====
The 2020 census featured similar designs to the 2000 and 2010 censuses. Subsequently, the Census Bureau adhered to the 1997 OMB standards and thus used two separate questions to collect data on race and ethnicity. However, there were improvements in the phrasing of the race and ethnicity questions within the OMB guidelines, that would enhance clarity for respondents.

The Hispanic origin question included the same checkboxes as the 2010 census ("Mexican, Mexican Am., Chicano", "Puerto Rican", "Cuban"), along with a "Yes, another Hispanic, Latino, or Spanish origin". Under this category, two changes emerged. The first was the shift from "Print origin, for example" to "Print, for example". The removal of the word origin was due to the surveyed confusion and differentiating meanings origin has for respondents or varying backgrounds. Furthermore, the Census Bureau updated the write-in instructions for the "Some Other Race" category and included the instruction to "Print race", but changed the instruction to read "Print race or origin" to match the primary instruction to "Mark ☒ one or more boxes AND print origins".

According to the United States Census Bureau, as a result of significant feedback, a detailed write-in response and example were included for the "White" and the "Black or African Am." racial categories to compensate a wider horizon of identities. There were also six example groups for each of the "White", "Black or African American", and "American Indian or Alaska Native" racial categories. In addition, after 100 years, the term "Negro" was removed from the 2020 census, as a large portion of respondents advocated for its removal. Instead, the category shifted from "Black, African Am., or Negro" to "Black or African Am." on paper questionnaires and electronic instruments.

The identification of the term African American first occurred in the 2000 census, reflecting a long-standing history of offensive terminology since the censuses' inception. The 1790 census included other "free persons" by color and "slaves". From 1850 to 1880, the codes for enumerators were generally Black (B) and Mulatto (M). In 1900, there were no specified categories on the census listing form, and the instructions called for enumerators to list "B" for "Black (or negro or negro descent)", displaying the first occurrence of the controversial term "Negro". In 1930, there were specific instructions that used the term "Negro". Mixed persons were to be counted as "Negro" no matter how small the share of blood, also known as the one-drop rule. It was not until 1970 that the term Black appeared on a census form, and in 1990 the enumerator of color was eliminated.

The 2020 census was also "the first to specifically solicit Middle Eastern North African (MENA) responses" through the write-in response for the White racial category. The term MENA includes the Arab American population, which is growing quickly as of 2023. This allowed the 2020 census to include dis-aggregated data on MENA populations, which made up over 3.5 million Americans. California, New York, and Michigan have the largest MENA populations, and Lebanese, Iranian, and Egyptian populations made up nearly half of them. This was almost triple the 2000 census' estimate of a population of 1.2 million Arab Americans, based on the "Ancestry" question rather than the racial category question. That number may have been an under count however, as 19% of the American population provided no answer for the "Ancestry" question.

This is significant because MENA identities were previously only tracked through the "Ancestry" write-in question on the American Community Survey in 2010. The Arab American population was then estimated through the number of responses that included one or more Arab ancestries. The 2020 census changed this by explicitly prompting write-in responses with Arab American examples listed as "Print, for example, German, Irish, English, Italian, Lebanese, Egyptian, etc".

The improvements are part of a larger effort reviewing the 1997 OMB guidelines, specifically to move MENA from under the White racial category into a new label. An OMB working group officially recommended a new MENA category in 2023 based on public feedback going back to 2015 and "plans to make final decisions on revisions by Summer 2024". Many people in the community "may not be perceived, nor perceive themselves, to be White". The added category could allow for more targeted funding, social programs, and political representation. A 2015 study from Rutgers University found significant inequalities in household income, citizenship rates, and English-speaking rates between New Jersey's White population and Arab population, concluding that America's White and Arab populations might be different enough both culturally and economically to justify a separate category.

The next change was reordering the example groups from "Argentinean, Colombian, Dominican, Nicaraguan, Salvadoran, Spaniard, and so on." to "Salvadoran, Dominican, Colombian, Guatemalan, Spaniard, Ecuadorian, etc." to reflect the ever-increasing geographic diversity of the Hispanic or Latino category and the variations in populations sums each year.

Percent net coverage error by race and Hispanic origin: 2010 and 2020
Race and Hispanic origin	2010	2020	Significant difference?
Total	0.01	−0.24	
Race alone or in combination			
White	0.54*	0.66*	No
Non-Hispanic White alone	0.83*	1.64*	Yes
Black or African American	−2.06*	−3.30*	No
Asian	0.00	2.62*	Yes
American Indian or Alaska Native	−0.15	−0.91*	No
On reservation	−4.88*	−5.64*	No
American Indian areas off reservation	3.86	3.06	No
Balance of the United States	0.05	−0.86*	No
Native Hawaiian or other Pacific Islander	−1.02	1.28	No
Some other race	−1.63*	−4.34*	Yes
Hispanic or Latino	−1.54*	−4.99*	Yes

*Net coverage error is statistically significantly different from 0.

Though the issues of identification questions of origin were addressed, the accuracy of the 2020 census displays undercounts and overcounts of Black people, Latinos, and Native Americans according to the work conducted under Robert Santos, the director of the United States Census Bureau from 2022 to 2025. A follow-up survey concluded that the miscounting of children under five years of age and that American Indians and Alaska Natives living on reservations continued to have the highest net undercount rate, similar to 2010. One of the leading factors of the misrepresented information in the 2020 census is the coronavirus pandemic, which caused notable delays in the Census Bureau's Post-Enumeration Survey. The Post-Enumeration Survey is used to determine how accurate the census results are and inform planning for the next national count in 2030. Furthermore, discrepancies persisted due to the irrefutable variables of delays to field work, migration of many college students and others, and some respondents failed to answer the necessary questions required for the Post-Enumeration Survey to match the census. Journalist Michael Wines of The New York Times attributes group quarters like college dormitories, long-term care facilities and prisons to have the largest contingencies in the tally as the pandemic pushed many university students to return home, making it harder to count them in the dormitories or apartments where they normally would have been.

Hispanic or Latino

Translating the data set, the 3.45 difference in net coverage error for the Hispanic or Latino category proves widely problematic, but is an avid reflection of the seismic shifts in the United States. Mexican immigrants have been at the center of one of the largest mass migrations in contemporary history, reaching a peak of 12.8 million in 2007, but have since declined, as reported by the Pew Research Center. The predominant reasoning being shifts in political authority and the coronavirus pandemic resulting in policy changes. More specifically, immigrants entering through a permanent legal residency (green card), visa overstays, and apprehensions have drastically changed the input and output of data.

The total number of non-immigrant visas processed in Mexico by the US Department of State dropped 35% in 2020 compared with the prior year, from about 1.5 million in 2019 to about 960,000 in 2020. The temporary visas were processed for tourism, business, or crossing the border. Consequently, due to political shifts, apprehensions of unauthorized Mexican immigrants increased considerably after the pandemic started in 2020. From October 1, 2019 to September 30, 2020, the number of detainments of Mexican adults at the US-Mexican border reached its highest levels since 2013 under president Donald Trump. There were 253,118 such encounters, up 52% from 166,458 the previous year.

== Relation between ethnicity and race in census results ==
The Census Bureau warns that data on race in 2000 census are not directly comparable to those collected in previous censuses. Many residents of the United States consider race and ethnicity to be the same.

Population distribution by race (2000 census)
Race	Hispanic or Latino	% of H/L	% of US	Not Hispanic or Latino	% of not H/L	% of US
All races	35,305,818	100	12.5	246,116,088	100	87.5
One race	33,081,736	93.7	11.8	241,513,942	98.1	85.8
White	16,907,852	47.9	6.0	194,552,774	79.1	69.1
Black or African A.	710,353	2.0	0.3	33,947,837	13.8	12.1
A. Indian/Alaska Nat.	407,073	1.2	0.1	2,068,883	0.8	0.7
Asian	119,829	0.3	<0.1	10,123,169	4.1	3.6
Hawaiian N. & Pacific Is.	45,326	0.1	<0.1	353,509	0.1	0.1
Some other	14,891,303	42.2	5.3	467,770	0.2	0.2
2+ races	2,224,082	6.3	0.8	4,602,146	1.9	1.6
Some other + W/B/N/A	1,859,538	5.3	0.7	1,302,875	0.5	0.5
2+ W/B/N/A	364,544	1.0	0.1	3,299,271	1.3	1.2

In the 2000 census, respondents were tallied in each of the race groups they reported. Consequently, the total of each racial category exceeds the total population because some people reported more than one race.

According to James P. Allen and Eugene Turner from California State University, Northridge, by some calculations in the 2000 census the largest part white biracial population is white/Native American and Alaskan Native, at 7,015,017, followed by white/black at 737,492, then white/Asian at 727,197, and finally white/Native Hawaiian and other Pacific Islander at 125,628.

The Census Bureau implemented a Census Quality Survey, gathering data from about 50,000 households to assess the reporting of race and Hispanic origin in the 2000 census with the purpose of creating a way to make comparisons between the 2000 census with previous census racial data.

In September 1997, during the process of revision of racial categories previously declared by OMB Directive No. 15, the American Anthropological Association (AAA) recommended that OMB combine the "race" and "ethnicity" categories into one question to appear as "race/ethnicity" for the 2000 census. The Interagency Committee agreed, stating that "race" and "ethnicity" were not sufficiently defined and "that many respondents conceptualize 'race' and 'ethnicity' as one and the same [sic] underscor[ing] the need to consolidate these terms into one category, using a term that is more meaningful to the American people."

The AAA also stated:

The American Anthropological Association recommends the elimination of the term "race" from OMB Directive 15 during the planning for the 2010 census. During the past 50 years, "race" has been scientifically proven to not be a real, natural phenomenon. More specific, social categories such as "ethnicity" or "ethnic group" are more salient for scientific purposes and have fewer of the negative, racist connotations for which the concept of race was developed. Yet the concept of race has become thoroughly—and perniciously—woven into the cultural and political fabric of the United States. It has become an essential element of both individual identity and government policy. Because so much harm has been based on "racial" distinctions over the years, correctives for such harm must also acknowledge the impact of "racial" consciousness among the U.S. populace, regardless of the fact that "race" has no scientific justification in human biology. Eventually, however, these classifications must be transcended and replaced by more non-racist and accurate ways of representing the diversity of the U.S. population.

The recommendations of the AAA were not adopted by the Census Bureau for the 2000, 2010, and 2020 censuses. This includes Hispanic, Latino, or Spanish origin, which remained an ethnicity, not a race. While race/ethnicity definitions for 2020 remained consistent, individuals who identify as White, Black/African American, and/or American Indian or Alaska Native were asked to specifically identify their racial origins.

== Other agencies ==
In 2001, the National Institutes of Health adopted the new language to comply with the revisions to Directive 15, as did the Equal Employment Opportunity Commission of the United States Department of Labor in 2007.

== See also ==
- Certificate of Degree of Indian Blood
- Classification of ethnicity in the United Kingdom
- Historical racial and ethnic demographics of the United States
- Judicial aspects of race in the United States
- Language Spoken at Home
- Race (human categorization)
- Race and ethnicity in censuses
- Race and ethnicity in the United States
- Racial segregation in the United States
- Visible minority
