= Nyitrai =

Nyitrai is a surname. Notable people with the surname include:

- Ádám Nyitrai, Hungarian footballer for FC Veszprém
- Barbara Nyitrai, municipal clerk of South Brunswick, New Jersey
- Imre Nyitrai, player on the 1967 Hungary national basketball team
- Márton Nyitrai, director whose video for Warpigs (band) won MTV Europe's Best Hungarian Music Video award in 1999
- Vera Nyitrai (1926–2011), Hungarian statistician
- Zsolt Nyitrai (born 1977), Hungarian politician
- Zsuzsa Nyitrai, Hungarian discus thrower, bronze medalist at the 1966 European Junior Games

== See also ==
- FC Nitra, Slovak football club originally called Nyitrai ÖTTSO
- Nyitra County, a region of the Kingdom of Hungary now in Slovakia
