= Chief Statistician of the United States =

U.S. federal statistical agencies

The chief statistician of the United States is a position in the U.S. federal government's Office of Management and Budget (OMB). The chief statistician is charged with providing coordination, guidance, and oversight for U.S. federal statistical agencies and activities.

The chief statistician heads the Statistical Policy Branch of the OMB's Office of Information and Regulatory Affairs (OIRA). The chief statistician is appointed by the Administrator of the OIRA.

Katherine Wallman was the chief statistician from 1992 to January 2017. Nancy Potok held the position from January 2017 to December 2019. After Potok left office, a job posting was listed on USAJobs to find a replacement. Dominic (Dom) Mancini was the acting replacement. The position remained vacant until April 2022, when Karin Orvis was appointed. In July 2025, Mark Calabria was appointed, replacing Karin Orvis.

== History ==
The current position of chief statistician was created by the Paperwork Reduction Act in 1980.

An earlier U.S. chief statistician, Stuart Rice, chaired the nuclear session of the United Nations Statistical Commission in 1946.

=== List of chief statisticians ===
- Stuart A. Rice (1939–1955)
- Raymond Bowman (1955–1969)
- Julius Shiskin (1969–1973)
- Joseph W. Duncan (1974–1981)
- vacant (1981–1983)
- Dorothy Tella (1983–1988)
- Herman Habermann (1988–1992)
- Katherine Wallman (1992 – January 2017)
- Nancy Potok (January 2017 – December 2019)
- Dominic (Dom) Mancini (acting, December 2019 – April 2022)
- Karin Orvis (April 2022 – July 2025)
- Mark Calabria (July 2025 – January 2026)
- Stuart Levenbach (January 2026 – Present)
