= United Nations Statistical Commission =

Statistical organization

- Abbreviation: StatCom
- Formation: 1946; 80 years ago
- Type: Intergovernmental organization, regulatory body, advisory board
- Legal status: Active
- Location: Headquarters of the United Nations, New York, United States
- Chair: Graciela Marquez, Mexico
- Parent organization: United Nations Economic and Social Council
- Subsidiaries: United Nations Statistics Division
- Website: unstats.un.org/unsd/statcom/

The United Nations Statistical Commission (StatCom) is a Functional Commission of the United Nations Economic and Social Council, established in 1946. The Statistical Commission oversees the work of the United Nations Statistics Division (UNSD). Since 2000, the commission has met every year, before then generally biannually.

The commission's 24 member states are elected by the Economic and Social Council on the basis of the following geographical distribution: African states (5), Asian States (4), Eastern European States (4), Latin American and Caribbean States (4), Western European and other States (7). In 2024, the Economic and Social Council decided to progressively increase the number of members in the commission from 24 to 54 until 2028, which aims to enhance representation and inclusivity. Member states are usually represented by their chief statistician.

As set forth by the Economic and Social Council, in the terms of reference, the Commission fulfils the function of “the primary body responsible for the management of statistical information and governance of statistics and data”. In doing so, it acts as the

apex forum for discussions, knowledge exchange and sharing of best practices on statistics and data across all domains, to develop and maintain international statistical standards and norms, tools and methodologies, to support and bolster the development of sustainable national statistical systems, to develop and build the capacity of national systems, to for the professional community of official statistics, and to ensure continued innovations to adapt to the changing statistical and data system.

In its 1994 special session, the commission agreed to adopt the Fundamental Principles of Official Statistics.

== The Bureau ==
The officers are the chairperson, 3 vice-chairpersons and the Rapporteur, elected for a one-year period by the members of the Commission at the beginning of a session. Since 1999, its role is more of a steering one; the chairman may seek for complementary assistance from other members (Friends of the chair).

Chairpersonship

Year	Session	Country	Chair
2026	57th	Mexico	Graciela Marquez
2025	56th	Switzerland	Georges-Simon Ulrich
2024	55th	Switzerland	Georges-Simon Ulrich
2023	54th	Hungary	Gabriella Vukovich
2022	53rd	Hungary	Gabriella Vukovich
2021	52nd	Japan	Shigeru Kawasaki
2020	51st	Japan	Shigeru Kawasaki
2019	50th	Kenya	Zachary Mwangi
2018	49th	Kenya	Zachary Mwangi
2017	48th	Brazil	Wasmália Bivar
2016	47th	Brazil	Wasmália Bivar
2015	46th	United Kingdom	John Pullinger
2014	45th	United Kingdom	Jil Matheson
2013	44th	Hungary	Gabriella Vukovich
2012	43rd	Hungary	Gabriella Vukovich
2011	42nd	Oman	Ali Bin Mahboob
2010	41st	Oman	Ali Bin Mahboob
2009	40th	South Africa	Pali Lehohla
2008	39th	South Africa	Pali Lehohla
2007	38th	Mexico	Gilberto Calvillo Vives
2006	37th	Mexico	Gilberto Calvillo Vives
2005	36th	US	Katherine Wallman
2004	35th	US	Katherine Wallman
2003	34th	Hungary	Tamás Mellár
2002	33rd	Hungary	Tamás Mellár
2001	32nd	Japan	Shigeru Kawasaki
2000	31st	Botswana	Guest Charumbira
1999	30th	Botswana	Guest Charumbira
1997	29th	Mexico	Carlos Jarque
1995	28th	United Kingdom	Bill McLennan
1994	Special session	Poland	Jozef Olenski
1993	27th	Netherlands	Willem Begeer
1991	26th	Netherlands	Willem Begeer
1989	25th	Argentina	Luis Alberto Beccaria
1987	24th	Ghana	Emmanuel Oti Boateng
1985	23rd	Ireland	Tom Linehan
1983	22nd	Hungary	Vera Nyitrai
1981	21st	US	Joseph W. Duncan
1979	20th	Soviet Union	Mikhail Antonovich Korolev
1976	19th	India	V. R. Rao
1974	18th	United Kingdom	Claus Moser
1972	17th	France	Jean Ripert
1970	16th	France	Jean Ripert
1968	15th	Australia	Keith Archer
1966	14th	Norway	Petter Jakob Bjerve
1965	13th	Norway	Petter Jakob Bjerve
1962	12th	Ireland	Donal McCarthy
1960	11th	Ireland	Donal McCarthy
1958	10th	New Zealand	George Wood
1956	9th	India	P.C. Mahalanobis
1954	8th	India	P.C. Mahalanobis
1953	7th	United Kingdom	Harry Campion
1951	6th	United Kingdom	Harry Campion
1950	5th	Netherlands	Philip Idenburg
1949	4th	Netherlands	Philip Idenburg
1948	3rd	Canada	Herbert Marshall
1947 (August)	2nd	Canada	Herbert Marshall
1947 (January)	1st	Canada	Herbert Marshall
1946	Nuclear session	US	Stuart A. Rice

== See also ==
- Committee for the Coordination of Statistical Activities
- List of national and international statistical services
- Fundamental Principles of Official Statistics
- United Nations Statistics Division
- Voorburg group
- World Statistics Day
