= Federal Statistical Office =

Federal Statistical Office may refer to

- Federal Statistical Office of Germany
- Federal Statistical Office (Switzerland)

== See also ==
- Federal statistical system, in the United States
