= Orvis (name) =

Orvis is the name of:

== Given name ==
- Orvis A. Kennedy (1907–1997), Canadian executive, manager, organizer, salesman and politician
- Orvis Sigler (1922–2016), American college basketball and baseball coach

== Surname ==
- Herb Orvis (1946–2020), American football player
- Julia Swift Orvis (1872–1949), American college professor
- Karin Orvis, U.S. government official and statistician
- Marianne Dwight Orvis (1816–1901), American letter writer and painter
- Rory Orvis (born 1975), Canadian darts player
