= Fundamental Principles of Official Statistics =

United Nations standards

The Fundamental Principles of Official Statistics or FPOS comprise ten standards for the operation of national statistical systems, agreed by the General Assembly of the United Nations in 2014 (resolution 68/261). The principles cover professional competence, international cooperation, legal status and independence from political interference. They envision that official statistics should meet the needs of users across all of society.

== Origins ==
The transition to a market economy from central planning during the dissolution of the Soviet Union meant countries were developing their statistical capability very quickly. Western European countries also supported standards to assert confidentiality of responses to their surveys. Expectations of professional independence in official statistics, were codified for the first time, drawing on the standards published by ISI in 1985. There was also an innovation in principle #4 which stipulated that statisticians could comment on erroneous interpretation of official data.

Principles to guide the work of official statistics, and maintain their independence from political influence, were developed in the European region in an international working group reporting in 1991. The Fundamental Principles were proposed by the Conference of European Statisticians (CES) and agreed at the UNECE in 1992, then by the UN Statistical Commission (UNSC) at a special session in 1994. There were no changes to the principles themselves in the wider adoption, just revision to the preamble to change references to the European extent of support.

== Principles ==
The principles introduced reflected professional good practice which had not been codified before but principle 4 was regarded as an innovation.

1. Relevance, impartiality and equal access
2. Professional standards and ethics
3. Accountability and transparency
4. Prevention of misuse
5. Sources of official statistics
6. Confidentiality
7. Legislation
8. National coordination
9. Use of international standards
10. International cooperation

== Implementation ==
Assessments of the practical adoption of the Fundamental Principles identified a gap between initial aspirations and expectations of stakeholders. However, several countries reported using FPOS as the basis for evaluating whether statistical systems were working as they should, both where these were developing and where they were established. This included international governmental bodies, such as the IMF, which republish national data to support international comparisons and may have challenges negotiating user needs and the negotiation of changes to technical standards.

Further attention was extended to propagating the principles in the least developed administrative settings as a condition of entry to global organisations such as the OECD. The SDGs also mention legislation consistent with FPOS in monitoring goal 17.18 and attention to development of leadership capability was a particular priority in the African region. Although the principles were designed by the national statistical institutes who adopted them, they reflected the good practice in other producers of statistics serving the public good, such as central banks.

== Consolidation ==
Substantial action was taken to introduce or enhance statistical legislation in many countries but tensions about the use of statistics to justify political decisions sustained. When FPOS was ratified by the UN General Assembly in 2014 and remitted back to UNSC, they were asked to keep their effectiveness under review. The friends of the chair group recommended UNSC focus on promotion of the principles, adherence to them, supporting challenges of misuse, and updating them for new context and that agenda was sustained at the 30th anniversary of adoption in 2022.

=== Promotion ===
The UNECE and CES organised a 30th anniversary recognising the enduring value of FPOS in 2022. Different nations celebrated each of the ten principles and statistical offices produced materials to raise their profile. The UNECE further developed short text to explain each principle in terms more familiar to a wider range of users to promote them beyond the statistical community.

=== Adherence ===
Implementation guidelines were developed to better explain the practicalities and support wider use following the ratification at the general assembly. In 2026 the UNSC established a consultative advisory board to support adherence to the principles by providing advice and developing guidance based on best practices.

=== Challenging misuse ===
Many countries' statisticians have needed to comment when statistics were misreported by the media or misrepresented in public discussion, including by politicians. In 2020 the International Association for Official Statistics organised some events on the topics of misuse and the application of principle 4 which "protects the right of statistical agencies to speak up when they see errors being made. This means that even when statistics are deliberately or accidentally misused by someone in a powerful position in government, official statisticians can set them straight without fear of reprisal."

=== Changing context ===
The dramatic shift in the importance of data has led to concerns that the principles need updating to apply to AI and other automated uses of data. But the principles are also the basis for national statistical offices making a claim to be at the centre of this transformation, because FPOS represents a coherent and trustworthy framework for data stewardship.
