= George Wood (New Zealand statistician) =

New Zealand statistician

Sir George Wood KBE ISO

4th Government statistician
- In office 9 August 1946 – January 1958
- Preceded by: James Butcher
- Succeeded by: John Baker

Chair of the United Nations Statistical Commission
- In office 1958–1960
- Preceded by: Prasanta Chandra Mahalanobis
- Succeeded by: Donal McCarthy

1st Chair of the Consumer Council
- In office July 1959 – 25 June 1975
- Succeeded by: Michael Young

Personal details
- Born: George Ernest Francis Wood; 13 July 1900 Greymouth, New Zealand
- Died: 18 December 1978 (aged 78) Whangārei, New Zealand
- Spouse: Eileen Alice Oudaille (m. 1929)
- Children: 2
- Education: Greymouth District High School
- Alma mater: Victoria University College
- Profession: Economist; statistician

Sir George Ernest Francis Wood KBE ISO (13 July 1900 – 18 December 1978) was a New Zealand economist and statistician. He served as government statistician in Palestine from 1938 to 1945, New Zealand government statistician from 1946 to 1958, and chair of the Consumer Council from 1959 to 1975. Wood chaired the United Nations Statistical Commission from 1958 to 1960, and was a director of the Reserve Bank between 1959 and 1963.

== Early life and family ==
Born in Greymouth on 13 July 1900, Wood was the son of George Francis and Margaret Wood. He was educated at Greymouth District High School, and went on to study economics at Victoria University College, graduating Master of Arts with second-class honours in 1924.

On 3 September 1928, Wood married Eileen Alice Oudaille, and the couple went on to have two children.

== Career ==
Wood began his public service career in March 1918, working in the Police Department. He moved to the Office of Census and Statistics (later the Department of Statistics and now Statistics New Zealand), in 1921, and rose to become chief compiler in 1937. Between 1938 and 1945, he was seconded to the British Colonial Service and was the government statistician in Palestine, in recognition of which service he was appointed an Officer of the Order of the British Empire in the 1946 New Year Honours.

After his return to New Zealand, Wood served as acting government statistician for a few months, before taking up the substantive role of government statistician on 9 August 1946. He remained in that position until his retirement at the end of January 1958. During his tenure, the Statistics Department began producing balance of payments data again in 1950 after a 22-year hiatus, and increased the level of detail in the information. He instigated the consumer price index (CPI) in New Zealand, and ensured that the figures were released in a timely fashion, generally within 10 days of the end of the period under review. Wood expanded the department's research capacity, and it began population forecasting, rather than just producing historical data, and drawing up actuarial life tables, which also included data relating to Māori for the first time. In 1953, Wood received the Queen Elizabeth II Coronation Medal, and in the 1956 Queen's Birthday Honours, he was appointed a Companion of the Imperial Service Order.

After his retirement as government statistician, Wood was elected chair of the 10th session of the United Nations Statistical Commission, from 1958 to 1960. The New Zealand prime minister at the time, Walter Nash, paid tribute to Wood, saying: "I am sure that he will give just as valuable service to the world—through United Nations—as he has given New Zealand".

Wood served as a director of the Reserve Bank of New Zealand from 1958 to 1963.

In July 1959, Wood was appointed inaugural chair of the Consumer Council (later called the Consumers' Institute, and now known as Consumer NZ) by the Minister of Industries and Commerce, Phil Holloway, who said that the council was "fortunate in having the services of a man of the calibre and experience of Mr Wood who had made a special study of prices and the distribution of national income", and that "he could think of no-one better qualified to guide the council in its work". He retired from the role of chair on 25 June 1975. The then-prime minister, Bill Rowling, said that Wood had played a vital part in the development of the organisation. The leader of the opposition, Robert Muldoon, noted that Wood's integrity had never been questioned. During Wood's 16 years as chair, the membership of the Consumers' Institute had gone from 1772 in the first year to 129,000, which Wood said was testament to "the impartial and incorruptible approach of the council to its work". Wood was intimately involved in the establishment of a complaints advisory service in 1973, which quickly grew to hear 12,648 complaints the following year and obtained redress in 98.8 per cent of cases deemed to warrant it.

In the 1975 Queen's Birthday Honours, Wood was promoted to Knight Commander of the Order of the British Empire, for public services, especially as chairman of the Consumer Council since 1959.

== Later life and death ==
The Woods moved to Whangārei around 1970. Wood died there on 18 December 1978, and was buried at Maunu Cemetery. Jack Lewin, government statistician from 1969 to 1973, paid tribute, saying that Wood was "small in inches but big in stature". He went on to say:

Greater than his statistical ability and more remarkable were his unsubduable courage and his unerring instinct for fairness and decency.

Eileen, Lady Wood, died in 1982.

== Selected publications ==
- Wood, G. E. (1963). The Consumer Council and its work. Wellington: Consumer Council.
- Wood, G. E. (1964). The woodsmiths: a study of advertising practices in New Zealand, with particular relevance to newspaper advertising. Wellington: Consumer Council.
- Wood, G. E. (1971). Consumers in action: the work of the New Zealand Consumer Council and Consumers' Institute. Wellington: Consumer Council.
- Wood, George (1976). Progress in official statistics, 1840–1957: a personal history. Wellington: Department of Statistics.
