= Lynda Carlson =

American statistician

- Born: Lynda Shirley Tepfer; 1943 (age 82–83)
- Education: Brooklyn College; University of Illinois at Urbana–Champaign (PhD)
- Spouse: George N. Carlson
- Awards: Presidential Meritorious Rank Award
- Scientific career
- Fields: Statistics
- Workplaces: U.S. Department of Energy; National Science Foundation
- Thesis: The Closing of the Brooklyn Navy Yard: A Case Study in Group Politics (1974)

Lynda Shirley Tepfer Carlson (born 1943) is a retired American statistician, formerly the director of the National Center for Science and Engineering Statistics of the National Science Foundation. As director of the center, she led an effort to collect information about college education by including this topic in the American Community Survey of the United States Census Bureau.

== Education and career ==
Carlson is a 1965 graduate of Brooklyn College, and earned a PhD in political science from the University of Illinois at Urbana–Champaign in 1974. Her dissertation was The Closing of the Brooklyn Navy Yard: A Case Study in Group Politics. She worked in the United States Department of Energy, becoming director of the Statistics and Methods Group in the Energy Information Administration, before moving to the National Science Foundation as director of the National Center for Science and Engineering Statistics in 2000. She retired in 2012.

== Recognition ==
Carlson was named a Fellow of the American Statistical Association in 2000, and a Fellow of the American Association for the Advancement of Science in 2011. She was the 2009 winner of the Roger Herriot Award for Innovation in Federal Statistics, given jointly by the Social Statistics and Government Statistics Sections of the American Statistical Association and by the Washington Statistical Society. She is also a recipient of the Presidential Meritorious Rank Award.

== Personal life ==
Carlson is married to George N. Carlson, an economist who also served the U.S. government as director of the Office of Tax Analysis in the United States Department of the Treasury. They met as graduate students in the library of the University of Illinois, where they had adjacent study carrels.
