= Stuart Levenbach =

United States government official

Chief Statistician of the United States
- Incumbent
- Assumed office January 2026
- President: Donald Trump
- Preceded by: Mark Calabria

Personal details
- Party: Republican
- Education: University of Michigan, Ann Arbor (BS); University of California, Santa Barbara (MS, PhD)

Stuart Levenbach is an American government official. He has been the chief statistician of the United States since January 2026, in charge of the Statistical Policy Branch of the Office of Information and Regulatory Affairs (OIRA) in the U.S. government's Office of Management and Budget (OMB).

== Background ==
Levenbach earned a Ph.D. in marine ecology from the University of California, Santa Barbara. He served in the U.S. Peace Corps as a volunteer forester. He worked in staff positions in at OIRA, elsewhere in OMB, and for the National Economic Council. In the first Trump Administration, he was the Chief of Staff for the National Oceanic and Atmospheric Administration. Then he was director of public affairs for the Americas for the Baker Hughes energy company.
