= Mark A. Calabria =

American academic and former US government official

Mark Calabria
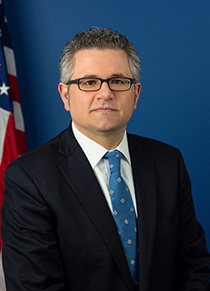

Chief Statistician of the United States
- In office July 2025 – January 2026
- President: Donald Trump
- Preceded by: Karin Orvis
- Succeeded by: Stuart Levenbach

Director of the Federal Housing Finance Agency
- In office April 9, 2019 – June 23, 2021
- President: Donald Trump; Joe Biden
- Preceded by: Mel Watt
- Succeeded by: Sandra L. Thompson

Personal details
- Born: Virginia, U.S.
- Party: Republican
- Education: George Mason University (BA, MA, PhD)
- Scientific career
- Fields: Finance; Banking; Housing
- Workplaces: Cato Institute
- Doctoral advisor: Richard E. Wagner

Mark Anthony Calabria was the chief statistician of the United States. In that role he was in charge of the Statistical Policy Branch of the Office of Information and Regulatory Affairs (OIRA) in the U.S. government's Office of Management and Budget (OMB). He was appointed to this position in July 2025, and left it in January 2026.

Calabria had been the director of the Federal Housing Finance Agency (FHFA) in 2019-2021. Previously, Calabria had been the chief economist for Vice President Mike Pence. President Biden removed him from the FHFA on June 23, 2021, following the Supreme Court decision in Collins v. Yellen.

== Career ==
On February 9, 2017, Calabria was selected by Vice President Mike Pence to serve as his chief economist.

Before that, Calabria was the director of Financial Regulation Studies at the Cato Institute; a member of the senior staff of the U.S. Senate Committee on Banking, Housing and Urban Affairs, where he handled issues related to housing, mortgage finance, economics, banking and insurance for Ranking Member Richard Shelby; a staffer on the Senate Banking Committee under Chairman Phil Gramm; and a Deputy Assistant Secretary for Regulatory Affairs at the U.S. Department of Housing and Urban Development. He also held a variety of positions at Harvard University's Joint Center for Housing Studies, the National Association of Home Builders, the National Association of Realtors and the U.S. Census Bureau's Center for Economic Studies.

Calabria is a frequent commentator in the media. He has appeared on C-SPAN's Book TV, CNBC's the Kudlow Report & Street Signs, Fox affiliate WTTG News, NBC affiliate WDSU News, and WOR's Steve Malzberg Show. He has also written for Forbes, The San Diego Union-Tribune, The Wall Street Journal, and the New York Post.

Calabria has also testified before Congress. In testimony before the House Committee on Financial Services in September 2009, he said that "the current foreclosure relief efforts have largely been unsuccessful because they have misidentified the underlying causes of mortgage default. It is not exploding ARMs or predatory lending that drives the current wave of foreclosures, but negative equity driven by house prices declines coupled with adverse income shocks that are the main driver of defaults on primary residences."

Calabria has been noted by the media for his pro-free market views.

== Notes ==
Political offices
| Preceded by Joseph Otting; Acting | Director of the Federal Housing Finance Agency; 2019–2021 | Succeeded by Sandra L. Thompson; Acting |
