= Karin Orvis =

United States government official

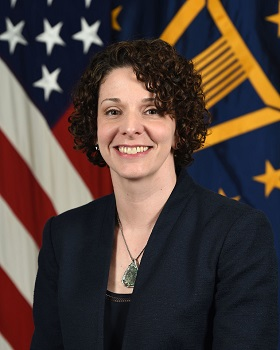

Chief Statistician of the United States
- In office May 2022 – July 2025
- President: Joe Biden
- Preceded by: Dom Mancini (Acting)
- Succeeded by: Mark Calabria

Personal details
- Education: Michigan State University (BS); George Mason University (MS, PhD)

Karin A. Orvis is a U.S. government official who served as the chief statistician of the United States from May 2022 to July 2025. She is in charge of the Statistical Policy Branch of the Office of Information and Regulatory Affairs.

== Career ==
Orvis earned a Ph.D. in industrial and organizational psychology from George Mason University, and a college degree in psychology from Michigan State University. She was an assistant professor at Old Dominion University. She held several Department of Defense positions including the Directorship of the Transition to Veterans Program Office, which supports military service members as they become veterans, and return to civilian life. She was appointed to be the Director of the Defense Suicide Prevention Office in 2019.

In April 2022, she was appointed to be Chief Statistician of the U.S. During her tenure, she oversaw the revisions to Statistical Policy Directive No. 15: Standards for Maintaining, Collecting, and Presenting Federal Data on Race and Ethnicity that was published in March 2024, after an inter-governmental and public commenting process that had started in 2022.
