= Rice index =

Statistical measure of cohesion in a voting group

The Rice index is a number between 0 and 1, which indicates the degree of agreement, within a voting body.

== History ==
It is named for Stuart A. Rice (1889-1969), Chairman of the United States Central Statistical Board, president of the American Statistical Association in 1933 and Assistant Director of the Office of Statistical Standards in the Bureau of the Budget from 1940 to 1955.

== Usage ==
A result of 0 indicates a stalemate, while a 1 indicates a perfect consensus. The formula is often used in the social sciences, and is the ratio of the difference between majority and minority to the sum of majority and minority.

$$RI = \frac{|\text{yes} - \text{no}|}{\text{yes} + \text{no}}$$

Yes = Number of yes votes, No = Number of votes against.
