= Sandra L. Thompson =

American government official

Sandra Thompson
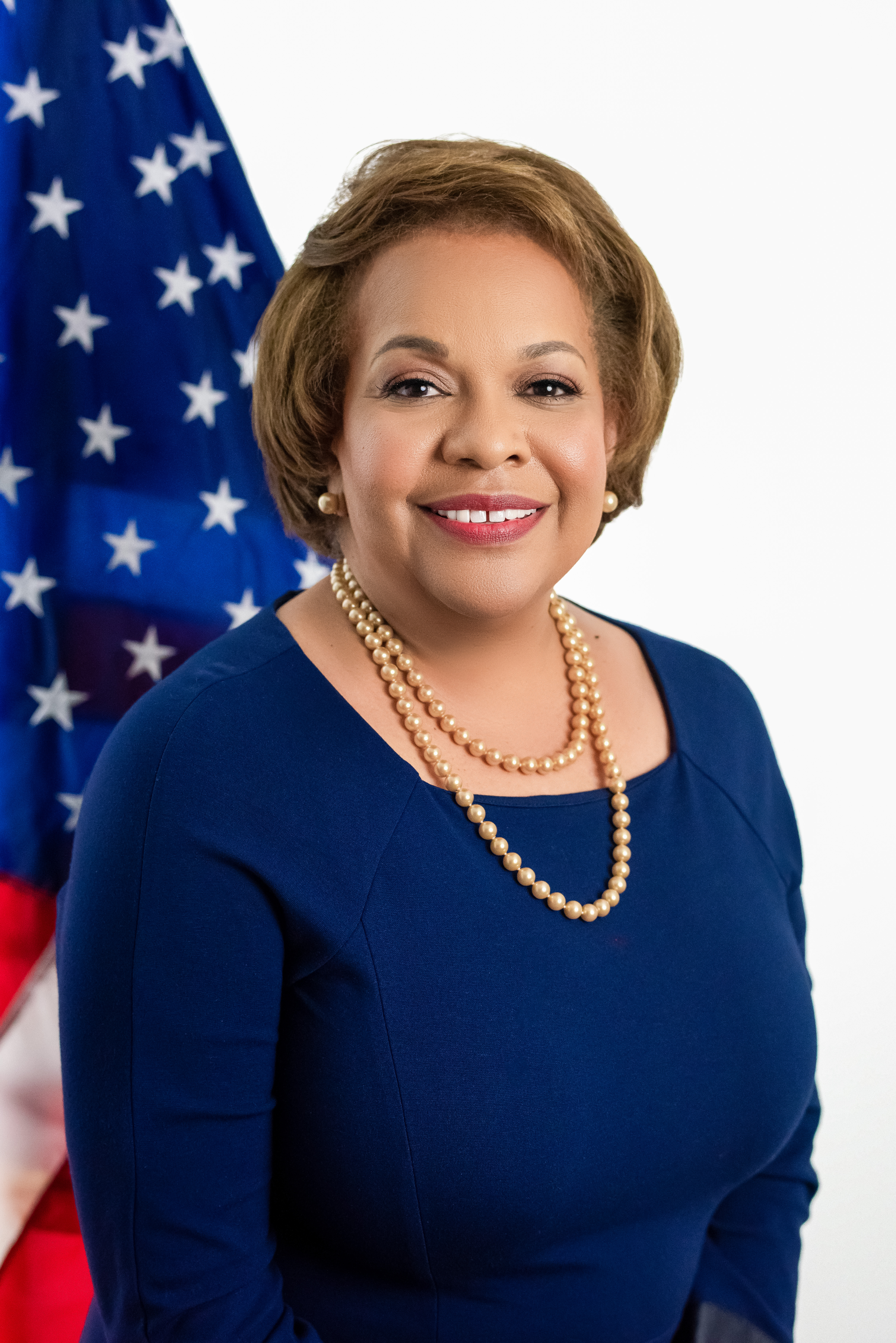
- Official portrait, 2021

Director of the Federal Housing Finance Agency
- In office June 22, 2022 – January 20, 2025
- President: Joe Biden
- Preceded by: Mark A. Calabria
- Succeeded by: Bill Pulte

Personal details
- Born: Chicago, Illinois, U.S.
- Children: 2
- Education: Howard University (BBA)

Sandra L. Thompson is an American government official who served as the director of the Federal Housing Finance Agency (FHFA) from 2022 to 2025. Previously serving as acting director since June 23, 2021, Thompson was nominated by President Biden on December 17, 2021 and sworn in on June 22, 2022. She was the first Black woman to lead the agency. During her tenure, she oversaw the FHFA's approach to the post-COVID-19 pandemic mortgage market.

== Early life and education ==
Thompson was born and raised on the South Side of Chicago, Illinois to parents who moved from Mississippi. She attended Chicago Public Schools. She is a graduate of Howard University in Washington, D.C.

== Career ==
Before joining the FHFA, Thompson had served for more than 23 years in various roles at the Federal Deposit Insurance Corporation, most recently as Director of the Division of Risk Management Supervision.

Prior to her role as director of the FHFA, Thompson served as Deputy Director of the Division of Housing Mission and Goals since March 2013. In 2019, she became a board member of WSSC Water in Prince George's County, Maryland.

=== FHFA Director (2022-2025) ===
Following the Supreme Court's decision in Collins v. Yellen (2021), which found that the current structure of the FHFA was unconstitutional as Congress had exceeded its authority by restricting the president's ability to dismiss the agency's head, the Biden administration announced plans to replace the current director, Mark A. Calabria, appointed under the previous president Donald Trump. On December 12, 2021, President Biden announced his intent to promote Thompson from her acting role as director, and on December 17 she was officially nominated. On May 25, 2022, Thompson was confirmed by the Senate in a 49-46 vote, largely along party lines.

During Thompson's tenure as Director, an overwhelming majority (91%) of FHFA employees voted to unionize, forming Chapter 343 of the National Treasury Employees Union in August 2023. Thompson resigned in January 2025.

== Personal life ==
As of 2019, she had been a resident of Prince George's County, Maryland for 23 years. She has two adult sons.
