= Vera Nyitrai =

Hungarian statistician (1926–2011)

- Born: June 26, 1926
- Died: February 17, 2011 (aged 84)
- Education: Pázmány Péter Catholic University
- Scientific career
- Fields: Statistics

Vera Nyitrai (née Gondos, Hungarian: Nyitrai Ferencné, June 26, 1926 – February 17, 2011) was a Hungarian statistician who became president of the Hungarian Central Statistical Office, and in 1983 became the first female chair of the United Nations Statistical Commission.

Nyitrai graduated from Pázmány Péter Catholic University in 1949, where she studied mathematics and physics. She joined the Hungarian Central Statistical Office at that time, and remained there for the rest of her career, earning a Ph.D. and Sc.D. while working there. She became president of the office in 1979.

In 1985, together with Jean-Louis Bodin, she founded the International Association for Official Statistics. She was the provisional chair of the association for two years, and became its first president in 1987. She also chaired the Statistical Committee of the Hungarian Academy of Science.

In 1980, Nyitrai was elected as a member of the International Statistical Institute, and she became a Fellow of the Royal Statistical Society in 1985. She won the Hungarian People's Republic State Prize in 1988. In 2003 she received the Commander's Cross of the Order of Merit of the Republic of Hungary. In 2006, the Hungarian Academy of Science awarded her their József Eötvös Wreath.
