= Dorothy Tella =

Statistician and government official

Dorothy Elizabeth Maney Tella is an American economist and was a government official. She was Chief Statistician of the United States from 1983 to 1988.

== Career ==
Dorothy Maney was born October 23, 1936, in Madison, Tennessee. She graduated from Mount Holyoke College in 1958, and earned a masters degree from Harvard University in 1961.

She worked as an economist at the Central Intelligence Agency and at the Social Security Administration in the 1960s. Her last name became Tella with her 1964 marriage.. She held private sector and university management roles from 1968 until 1983.

In 1983 she was hired back into the U.S. government as Chief of the Statistical Policy Office in the OIRA in OMB, and therefore Chief Statistician of the United States. At OMB, she was in charge of an office with a staff of seven, coordinating a dozen U.S. federal statistical agencies. In 1984, President Reagan appointed her to be also the U.S representative to the Statistical Commission of the Economic and Social Council of the United Nations.
