= Stuart A. Rice (statistician) =

American statistician and sociologist

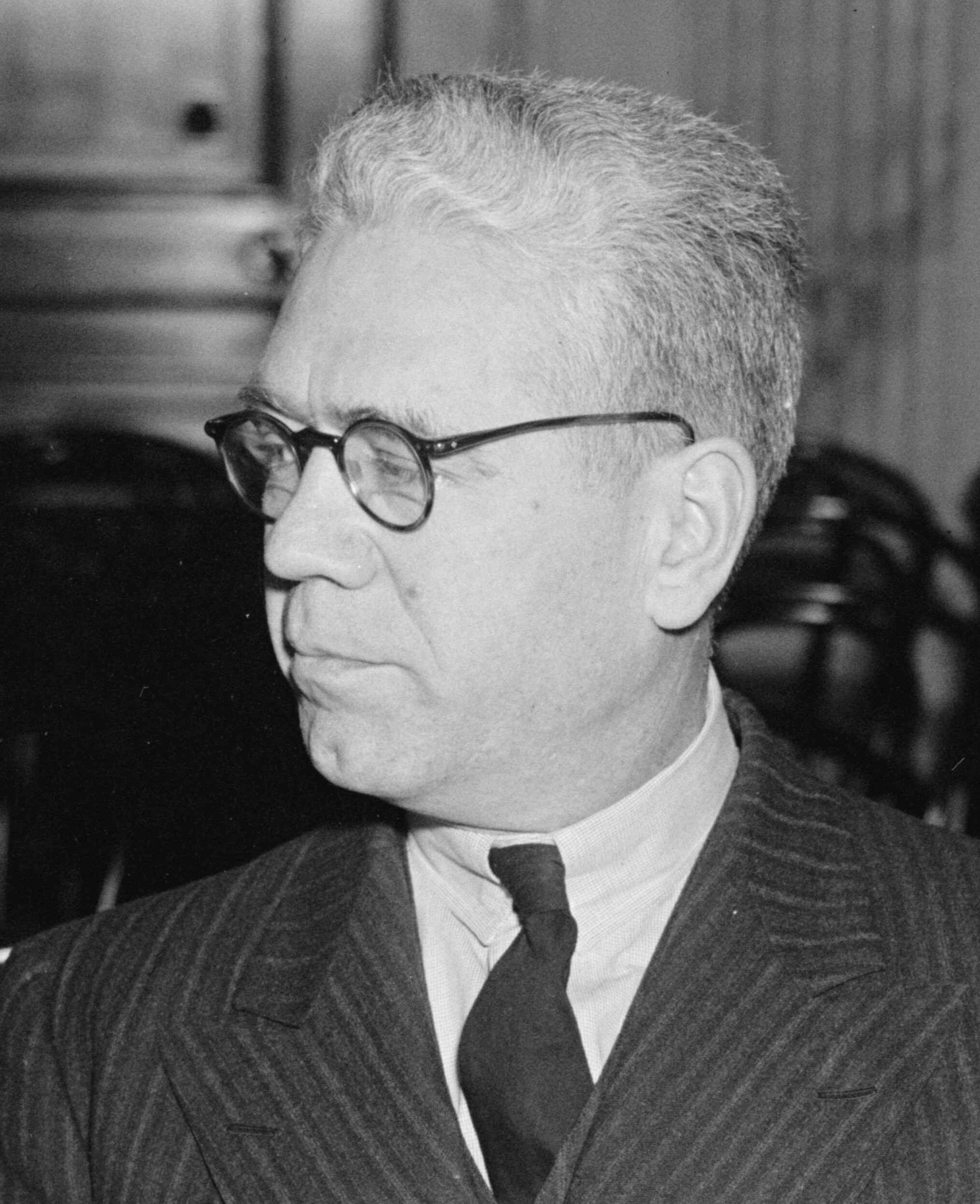
- Rice in 1938
- Born: November 21, 1889; Wadena, Minnesota
- Died: June 4, 1969 (aged 79); Washington, D.C.
- Occupations: Statistician, Sociologist

Stuart Arthur Rice (November 21, 1889 – June 4, 1969) was an American statistician and sociologist with a long and distinguished career in the Federal Statistical System of the United States.

== Education and early career ==
Stuart A. Rice was born in Wadena, Minnesota, November 21, 1889. He earned a master's degree from the University of Washington in 1915 and a PhD in sociology from Columbia University in 1924. In his dissertation, he proposed a concept to measure the degree of agreement within a voting body, which is now known as the Rice index. He was instructor and assistant professor of sociology at Dartmouth College (1923–1926), and professor of sociology and statistics at the University of Pennsylvania (1926–1933). In 1933 he served as president of the American Statistical Association.

== Career in Government statistics ==
In 1933, Rice became Assistant Director of the Bureau of the Census. Recognizing the need to modernize parts of the statistical system, he was instrumental in the founding of the Committee on Government Statistics and Information Services (COGSIS) and served as its Acting Chairman, promoting modern techniques of survey sampling and mathematical statistics to federal agencies. In 1936 he moved from the Census Bureau to chair the Central Statistical Board. In 1940 the Central Statistical Board was restructured as the Division (later Office) of Statistical Standards in the Bureau of the Budget (later Office of Management and Budget) and Rice became Assistant Director for Statistical Standards in the Budget Bureau. During the Second World War, he fostered the development of the Inter-American Statistical Institute.

Rice was president of the International Statistical Institute from 1947 to 1953. He helped establish the Statistical Office of the United Nations and served as the first Chairman of the United Nations Statistical Commission. While spending a lot of his time on consulting work for foreign governments, he remained in his post at the Bureau of the Budget until he retired from governmental statistics in 1955.

== Later life ==
After his career in official statistics, Rice founded Stuart A. Rice Associates (later Surveys & Research Corporation), a statistical consulting firm, and was still regularly present at scientific meetings. He died in Washington, D.C., on June 4, 1969. His papers are preserved at the Harry S. Truman Library and Museum.

== Recognition ==
Rice was named a Fellow of the American Statistical Association in 1933. The District of Columbia Sociological Society have named an award after him, the Stuart A. Rice Merit Award for Career Achievements.
