= Nancy Potok =

American civil servant

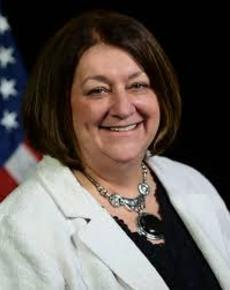

Chief Statistician of the United States
- In office January 3, 2017 – December 31, 2019
- President: Barack Obama; Donald Trump
- Preceded by: Katherine Wallman
- Succeeded by: Dom Mancini (Acting)

Personal details
- Education: Sonoma State University (BS); University of Alabama in Huntsville (MS); George Washington University (PhD)

Nancy A. Potok is a former American government official who served as the chief statistician of the United States from January 2017 to December 2019. She is currently the CEO of NAPx Consulting.

== Early life and education ==
Potok grew up in suburban Detroit. She was a National Merit Scholarship finalist and attended the University of Michigan as a freshman. She earned a B.A. in Environmental Studies from Sonoma State University, an M.A.S. from University of Alabama - Huntsville, and a PhD from George Washington University's Trachtenberg School of Public Policy and Public Administration.

== Career ==
Potok has held a succession of executive positions in government, the non-profit sector, and the private sector. She began her federal career as a Presidential Management Fellow at the U.S. Department of Transportation, where she served on a detail to the Senate Appropriations Committee and a commission studying the roles and missions of the U.S. Coast Guard. Subsequently, she was a transportation program examiner in the Executive Office of the President, U.S. Office of Management and Budget; Deputy Associate Director at the Administrative Office of the U.S. Courts; and Principal Associate Director at the U.S. Census Bureau during the 2000 Census. She left government to become Senior Vice President at the NORC at the University of Chicago, and Chief Operating Officer at McManis & Monsalve Associates. Potok returned to government in 2009 as the Deputy Under Secretary for Economic Affairs and then was appointed the first female Deputy Director and Chief Operating Officer at the United States Census Bureau prior to her appointment as Chief Statistician of the United States.

While Chief Statistician, Potok served as a Commissioner on the congressionally established U.S. Commission on Evidence-Based Policymaking. In 2020, Potok was named a volunteer member of the Joe Biden presidential transition Agency Review Team to support transition efforts related to the Department of Commerce. She co-chaired the American Statistical Association Task Force to develop indicators used to assess the quality of the 2020 Census.

Potok has served on numerous Boards of Directors/Trustees including Chair, Board of Trustees for the Institute of Pure and Applied Mathematics (IPAM) at UCLA (2014–present); Chair, Board of Scientific and Technical Advisors for the non-profit Coleridge Initiative (2020–2022); member, Board of Directors, National Institute for Statistical Science (2018–present); member, Board of Directors, The Data Foundation (2019–present); member, Board of Advisors and editor, Harvard Data Science Review (2019–present).

Potok served as an adjunct professor at the Trachtenberg School of Public Policy and Public Administration from 2011 to 2019. She is a Senior Fellow at the George Washington University Center for Excellence in Public Leadership, a Visiting Scholar at New York University, and a Sage at the Partnership for Public Service.

== Publications ==
Potok has published numerous white papers, book chapters, magazine articles, op-eds, blogs, and conference presentations and has appeared on many podcasts and radio broadcasts and webinars on topics related to data, statistics, and evidence building.

== Awards and recognition ==
Fellow of the American Statistical Association (2023)

Named to Federal 100 (2018)

Presidential Rank Award (2017)

Named in Women Leaders in Federal Statistics (2016). Leadership and Women in Statistics, edited by Amanda L. Golbeck, Ingram Olkin, & Yulia R. Gel. 174–178. CFRC Press Boca Raton, FL

Secretary of Commerce Gold Medal (2016) and Silver Medal (1999)

Federal Enterprise Risk Manager of the Year, AFERM (2015)

Distinguished Alumni Award, The George Washington University Trachtenberg School of Public Policy and Public Administration (2012)

Fellow of the National Academy of Public Administration (2003)

Arthur S. Flemming Award (1991)

== Personal life ==
Nancy Potok (née Fagenson) is the daughter of World War II veteran and Bronze Star awardee William Fagenson, who served with the 96th Infantry, 381st Regiment. Her brother is musician, producer, and president of Blue Note Records Don Was.
