= Voorburg group =

The Voorburg Group on Services Statistics was created in 1986, in response to a request from the United Nations Statistical Office (UNSO), for assistance in developing services statistics. The first meeting, hosted by the Netherlands Statistical Office (CBS) was held in January 1987 in Voorburg, Netherlands, from which the Group derives its name.

== Purpose ==
The purpose of the Voorburg Group (VG) is to address issues related to the production of service statistics, including service product outputs and inputs, the estimation of the real product of service activities, price indices of service products and industries, and their implications for product and industry classification (Central Product Classification (CPC) and International Standard Classification of All Economic Activities (ISIC)).

In 2005, the VG received a renewed mandate from the United Nations Statistical Commission concerning its objective, focus and scope. The objective of the VG is to establish an internationally comparable methodology for measuring the constant dollar outputs of the service industries. The focus of the VG is to develop concepts, methods, and best practices in the area of services. The scope of the VG is centered on producer price indices (PPIs) for services, turnover by products, and classifications.

The Voorburg Group has contributed over the years to building up and sharing a considerable and growing body of knowledge of Service Sector Statistics. It has prompted international cooperation in the development of standards and has assisted in resolving statistical and measurement challenges in the Service Sector.
