= World Statistics Day =

Statistical related celebration in October

- Date: 20 October
- Frequency: Every five years

World Statistics Day is an international day to celebrate statistics. Created by the United Nations Statistical Commission, it was first celebrated on 20 October 2010. World Statistics Day is celebrated every five years.

As of 2010, 103 countries celebrate a national Statistics Day, including 51 African countries that jointly celebrate African Statistics Day annually on 18 November. India celebrates its statistics day on 29 June, the birthday of the statistician Prasanta Chandra Mahalanobis. The Royal Statistical Society in the UK also launched its getstats statistical literacy campaign on the same day at 20:10 (on 20 October 2010).

On 20 October 2025 United Nations World Statistics Day (WSD) celebrated under the theme 'driving change with quality statistics and data for everyone'.
