= Ron Haskins =

Personal details
- Education: University of North Carolina at Chapel Hill
- Awards: Fellow of the American Academy of Political and Social Science

Ron Haskins is an American political scientist, focusing on several political topic issues, currently the Cabot Family Chair at Brookings Institution and an Elected Fellow of the American Academy of Political and Social Science. He won a Daniel Patrick Moynihan prize with Isabel Sawhill.

== Life ==
He graduated from University of North Carolina at Chapel Hill with a Ph.D. in Developmental Psychology in 1975. He served on the staff of the House Ways and Means Committee, and presidential Senior Advisor for Welfare Policy.

== Works ==
- Show Me the Evidence: Obama's Fight for Rigor and Evidence in Social Policy Washington, D.C. : Brookings Institution Press, 2015. (With Greg Margolis.) ISBN 9780815725718, OCLC 893316940
- Work over Welfare: The Inside Story of the 1996 Welfare Reform Law Washington : Brookings Institution Press, 2007. ISBN 9780815735151, OCLC 171111705
