= National Center for Science and Engineering Statistics =

Federal statistical agency of the United States

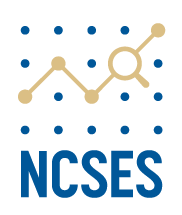

Agency overview
- Formed: February 15, 2011; 15 years ago
- Preceding agency: National Science Foundation, Division of Science Resources Statistics
- Headquarters: National Science Foundation Building, 2415 Eisenhower Ave, Alexandria, VA, US
- Employees: 56 full-time permanent (2020)
- Annual budget: US$58 million (2020)
- Agency executive: Emilda Rivers, Director
- Parent agency: National Science Foundation
- Website: ncses.nsf.gov

The National Center for Science and Engineering Statistics (NCSES) is one of the thirteen principal statistical agencies of the United States and is tasked with providing objective data on the status of the science and engineering enterprise in the U.S. and other countries. NCSES sponsors or co-sponsors data collection on 15 surveys and produces two key publications: Science and Engineering Indicators, and Women, Minorities, and Persons with Disabilities in Science and Engineering. Though policy-neutral, the data and reports produced by NCSES are used by policymakers when making policy decisions regarding STEM education and research funding in the U.S.

== History, mission and organization ==
The National Center for Science and Engineering Statistics (NCSES) is a principal agency of the Federal Statistical System of the United States that serves as a clearinghouse for collecting, interpreting, analyzing, and disseminating objective statistical data on the United States and other nations’ science and engineering enterprises. This includes data on the science and engineering workforce, the condition and progression of science, technology, engineering, and mathematics (STEM) education in the U.S. and abroad, and U.S. competitiveness in science, engineering, technology, and research and development (R&D). Additionally, NCSES's U.S. Congressional mandate includes supporting research that uses the data NCSES have acquired, educating and training researchers in the use of these data, and conducting methodological research in areas related to data collection and analysis. NCSES is also required to provide information to practitioners, researchers, policymakers, and the public using the processes established by the Foundations for Evidence-Based Policymaking Act of 2019 (Evidence Act).

NCSES is unique as the only federal statistical agency to also be a division within the National Science Foundation (NSF). Originally named the Division of Science Resources Statistics and located within NSF's Directorate for Social, Behavioral and Economic Sciences, Section 505 of the America COMPETES Reauthorization Act of 2010 authorized the division to be renamed the National Center for Science and Engineering Statistics and expanded the new center's role within NSF. Despite the name change, recognized by NSF on February 15, 2011, NCSES continues to serve as the primary statistical resource for NSF.

NCSES is the second smallest of the thirteen U.S. Federal statistical agencies in terms of staff (56 permanent full-time employees as of 2020), but ranks 9th in terms of budget ($58 million for fiscal year 2020). Despite its relatively small size, NCSES is composed of seven different programs. The Administrative and Program Operations Groups is responsible for managerial, budget, and business process support, as well as assistance to the Office of the Director. The Human Resources Statistics Program is responsible for collecting and disseminating data on STEM education and the STEM workforce. The Information and Technology Services Program oversees NCSES's data management and information dissemination, both print and electronic. The Office of the Director, which includes the NCSES Director, Deputy Director, Chief Statistician, and Research Director, sets priorities for the center and ensures NCSES meets its Congressional mandate. The Research and Develop Statistics Program is responsible for collecting and disseminating data on U.S. R&D including expenditures, infrastructure, innovation, and international comparability. The Science and Engineering Indicators Program is tasked with producing the biennial Congressionally mandated report Science and Engineering Indicators. The Statistics, Methods and Research Program provides statistical and survey methodology support within NCSES and conducts statistical research with a focus towards improving the quality of the data collected by NCSES.

NCSES Directors
Name	Started	Ended
Emilda B. Rivers (Current)	June 24, 2018	–
John R. Gawalt	2012	April 2018
Lynda T. Carlson	February 15, 2011	February 2, 2012

== Key publications ==
While NCSES prepares or assists with preparing many different reports, briefs, and working papers, the center focuses on two key publications: the Science and Engineering Indicators (SEI) report and the Women, Minorities, and Persons with Disabilities in Science and Engineering (WMPDSE) report. SEI is a biennial Congressionally mandated report prepared by NCSES under the guidance of the National Science Board that provides quantitative information on the scope, quality, and vitality of the U.S science and engineering enterprise, as well as competitiveness in this area compared with other countries. While SEI is policy neutral, the report is intended to inform the development of future domestic and international science and engineering policy. The 2020 SEI included thematic sub-reports on the following 9 areas:

- Academic Research and Development
- Elementary and Secondary Mathematics and Science Education
- Higher Education in Science and Engineering
- Invention, Knowledge Transfer, and Innovation
- Production and Trade of Knowledge- and Technology-Intensive Industries
- Publications Output: U.S. Trends and International Comparisons
- Research and Development: U.S. Trends and International Comparisons
- Science and Engineering Labor Force
- Science and Technology: Public Attitudes, Knowledge, and Interest

The WMPDSE is also a biennial report, mandated by the Science and Engineering Equal Opportunities Act (Public Law 96-516), that provides information on the participation of women, minorities, and persons with disabilities in STEM education and the science and engineering workforce. Similar to SEI, WMPDSE is policy neutral, but intended to inform the development of future domestic and international science and engineering policy.

== Current initiatives ==
As evidenced by existing surveys, the science and engineering enterprise workforce has traditionally only included individuals with bachelor's, Master's, and/or doctorates in STEM fields. The United States Census Bureau, however, estimates there are approximately 17 million individuals over the age of 25 who work in highly technical fields who do not possess a bachelor's degree. These individuals have been called the Skilled Technical Workforce (STW) and have been identified by the National Academies of Sciences, Engineering, and Medicine's Committee on National Statistics, the National Science Board's STW Task Force, and the Innovations in Mentoring, Training, and Apprenticeships Act of 2018 as a segment of the U.S. science and engineering workforce that needs to be measured to better understand health and breadth of the U.S. science and engineering enterprise. As a result, NCSES launched the STW Initiative to collect data on this segment of the workforce that include the creation of a new survey: the National Training, Education, and Workforce Survey.

== Data and surveys ==
In keeping with the Evidence Act, much of the data that NCSES has acquired, including data used in the SEI and WMPDSE reports, is available to researchers, policymakers, and the general public for free as de-identified public-use microdata. Restricted-use data files that may contain information that could lead to direct or indirect identification of respondents can also be requested, but requires an application describing the intended use and approval from NCSES. As of March 2021, NCSES sponsors or co-sponsors ongoing data collection on 15 surveys in four content areas.

=== Education of scientists and engineers ===
Survey of Earned Doctorates (SED) – The SED is likely the most well-known survey, at least to scientists in the U.S., because it is a census that collects data on the educational history, demographic characteristics, and postgraduation plans for all individuals receiving a research doctorate from an accredited U.S. institution in a given academic year. The SED, in partnership with the National Institutes of Health (NIH), the United States Department of Education, and the National Endowment for the Humanities, has been collected annually since 1957.

Survey of Graduate Students and Postdoctorates in Science and Engineering (GSS) – The GSS, collected in partnership with NIH, is an annual census started in 1966. The GSS collects data on demographic characteristics and financial support for all graduate students, postdoctoral researchers, and doctorate-holding nonfaculty researchers at academic institutions in the U.S., Guam, and Puerto Rico granting research-based master's and doctoral degrees in science, engineering, and selected health fields as of the fall of the survey year.

=== Research and development funding and expenditures ===
Annual Business Survey (ABS) – The ABS, started in 2018 and collected annually in partnership with the U.S. Census Bureau, is actually composed of two surveys. The ABS-1 collects data on R&D, innovation, technology, intellectual property, and business owner characteristics for a sample of all nonfarm, for-profit businesses operating in the US with fewer than 10 employees. The ABS-1 includes questions from the Business Research and Development and Innovation Survey – Microbusiness (BRDI-M). The ABS-2 collects the same data as the ABS-1 for a sample of all nonfarm, for-profit businesses operating within the U.S. with 10 or more employees with exception of R&D activity, which is captured by the Business Enterprise Research and Development Survey (BERD).

Business Enterprise Research and Development Survey (BERD) – The BERD [formerly known as the Business Research and Development Survey (BRDS, 2017–2018), the Business Research and Development and Innovation Survey (BRDIS; 2008–2016), and the Survey of Industrial Research and Development (SIRD; 1953–2007), respectively] is an annual survey started in 2018 in partnership with the Census Bureau. The BERD collects data on R&D activity, including expenditures and employees, for nonfarm, for-profit businesses operating within the U.S. with 10 or more employees that spent $50,000 or more on R&D activities in the calendar year of the survey.

Federally Funded Research and Development Centers (FFRDC) Research and Development Survey (FFRDC-RDS) – The FFRDC-RDS, an annual census started in 2001, collects data on R&D activities at all forty-two FFRDCs as defined by the NSF Master Government List of FFRDCs.

Higher Education Research and Development Survey (HERD) – The HERD [formerly known as the NSF Survey of Research and Development Expenditures at Universities and College (Academic R&D Expenditures Survey; 1972–2009)] is an annual census started in 2010. The HERD collects data on R&D activities at all U.S. institutions of higher educations, specifically universities and colleges, that reported at least $150,000 in R&D expenditures in the prior fiscal year.

Nonprofit Research Activities Survey (NPRA) – The NPRA collects data on R&D activities from a sample of U.S. non-academic nonprofit organizations, specifically organizations with a 501(c) designation. The NPRA is NCSES's newest survey with the initial data collection occurring in 2018.

Survey of Federal Funds for Research and Development (FFS) – The FFS is an annual census that has collected data on all R&D activities funded by the federal government of the U.S since 1951. These data are used by the Established Program to Stimulate Competitive Research, the Federal Laboratory Consortium for Technology Transfer program, the Small Business Innovation Research program, and the Small Business Technology Transfer program.

Survey of Federal Science and Engineering Support to Universities, Colleges, and Nonprofit Institutions (FSESS) – The FSESS is an annual census that has collected data on all R&D activities at all nonprofit or academic institutions, specifically universities and colleges, funded by the federal government of the U.S since 1963.

Survey of State Government Research and Development (SRDS) – The SRDS is an annual census of all R&D activities funded by the state governments of the 50 U.S. states, the District of Columbia, and Puerto Rico and has been collected since 2006.

=== Science and engineering research facilities ===
Survey of Science and Engineering Research Facilities (SEFS) – The SEFS started data collection in 1986 and is a biennial census of the cost and space of S&E research facilities at all U.S. research-performing universities and colleges that reported at least $1 million in R&D expenditures on the HERD survey.

=== Science and engineering workforce ===
Early Career Doctorates Survey (ECDS) – Started in 2015 in partnership with NIH, the ECDS collects data on demographic characteristics and professional activities including achievements, research, and work-life balance for a sample of individuals who earned their first doctorate degree in the previous 10 years.

National Survey of College Graduates (NCSG) – The biennial NCSG, started in 1993, collects data on a sample of individuals who are younger than 76, have at least a bachelor's degree, and are living in the U.S. during the time of the survey, with a focus on individuals in the science and engineering workforce.

Survey of Doctorate Recipients (SDR) – Started in 1973, the SDR collects data biennially on demographic characteristics, employment, and occupation for a sample of individuals who hold a doctorate in a science, engineering, or health (SEH) field and are under the age of 76.

Survey of Postdocs at Federally Funded Research and Development Centers (FFRDCPS) – The FFRDCPS is a periodic survey, first collected in 2005, that measures demographic characteristics and fields of research for all postdoctoral researchers at FFRDCs.

== Data and publication usage examples ==
While the following examples are not intended to be an exhaustive list, it is illustrative to see some examples of how NCSES survey data and reports are currently being used by researchers and policymakers.

Budgeting for Federal Investment: The Congressional Budget Office (CBO) is a nonpartisan, policy-neutral federal agency that releases annual reports containing cost estimates for proposed legislation. The CBO's 2021 Budgeting for Federal Investment report, which focuses on investment in physical capital, education, and research and development, includes the Bureau of Economic Analysis’s measure of depreciation which is based, in part, on the BERD survey data.

Faculty Job Satisfaction: Academic researchers interested in studying whether university faculty job satisfaction differed as a function of gender and discipline used the 2003 SDR data.

State-Level Innovation: The Brookings Institution prepared a report titled Ideas for Pennsylvania Innovation: Examining Efforts by Competitor States and National Leaders for the Commonwealth of Pennsylvania with suggestions to increase its innovation economy that included information from the HERD survey.

STEM Education: The Congressional Research Service is a nonpartisan public policy research institute within the Library of Congress that prepares reports for members of Congress and Congressional committees such as the Science, Technology, Engineering, and Mathematics (STEM) Education: An Overview report that includes science and engineering degree information from the SED survey.

Teamwork in STEM: The SED survey data were also used to investigate whether an increased focus on interdisciplinary team-based research had an impact on job satisfaction among STEM doctoral graduates.

Women in Academic Science: Researchers published a paper titled "Women in Academic Science: A Changing Landscape" that sought to make sense of the contradictory literature on the topic that used both the SEI reports and SED survey data.

== Research grants and fellowships ==
To improve the quality and efficiency of data collection and analysis, NCSES directly funds survey-related analytic and methodological research through its annual competitive Research on the Science and Technology Enterprise: Statistics and Surveys program (RSTESS; Solicitation 15-521). In addition to survey methodology research, the RSTESS program also accepts proposals for research projects that use NCSES data to investigate research questions on the science and technology enterprise, efforts to create or improve indicators of activities and resources related to the science and technology enterprise, doctoral dissertation projects, and workshops, as well as funding research fellowships at the center. The research fellowships are administered by the Oak Ridge Institute for Science and Education (ORISE) and Oak Ridge Associated Universities (ORAU) or by the American Association for the Advancement of Science (AAAS).
