= Gilberto Calvillo Vives =

Gilberto Calvillo Vives (born 3 November 1945 in Mexico City) is the president of the National Institute of Statistics, Geography and Informatics (INEGI).

He obtained a BSc in physics and mathematics at the Instituto Politécnico Nacional (IPN), a MSc in science, and a PhD in Operations Research at the University of Waterloo in Ontario, Canada.

As president of the National Institute of Statistics, Geography and Informatics (INEGI), he is currently president of the executive committee of the Statistical Conference of the Americas and president of the United Nations Statistics Commission. He is also a member of the Food and Agriculture Organization of the United Nations.

Before being appointed president of INEGI, he worked in the Mexican Olympic Committee, PEMEX and the World Bank.

== See also ==
- List of University of Waterloo people
