= Statistical Policy Directive =

Requirements for Federal statistical agencies

Statistical Policy Directive (SPD) is a requirement by the Office of Management and Budget for the Federal statistical system in "the design, collection, processing, editing, compilation, storage, analysis, release, and dissemination of statistical information".

The Directives identify minimum requirements for engaging in statistical activities, such as statistical surveys, statistical products, Standard Occupational Classification (SOC), and data on race and ethnicity. Directive No. 1 stipulates the responsibilities of Federal statistical agencies and units, and some may be more relevant than the other to the specific objective of an agency. Subsequent directives and revisions are issued only when necessary to ensure the quality, objectivity, and coordination of Federal official statistics and the agencies that collect them.

The Directives cover 13 principal Federal statistical agencies:

- Bureau of Economic Analysis (Department of Commerce)
- Bureau of Justice Statistics (Department of Justice)
- Bureau of Labor Statistics (Department of Labor)
- Bureau of Transportation Statistics (Department of Transportation)
- Census Bureau (Department of Commerce)
- Economic Research Service (Department of Agriculture)
- Energy Information Administration (Department of Energy)
- National Agricultural Statistics Service (Department of Agriculture)
- National Center for Education Statistics (Department of Education)
- National Center for Health Statistics (Department of Health and Human Services)
- National Center for Science and Engineering Statistics (National Science Foundation)
- Office of Research, Evaluation, and Statistics (Social Security Administration)
- Statistics of Income Division (Department of the Treasury)

Statistical units such as Microeconomic Surveys Unit of the Federal Reserve Board and newly recognized Federal statistical agencies are also covered.
