= Donal McCarthy =

Irish academic, public servant, university administrator, hurler and Gaelic footballer

Personal information
- Native name: Dómhnall Mac Carthaigh (Irish)
- Born: 4 June 1908 Midleton, County Cork, Ireland
- Died: 31 January 1980 (aged 71) Cork, Ireland
- Occupations: University professor; Director of the Economic and Social Research Institute; President of UCC

Sport
- Sport: Hurling
- Position: Right wing-back
Clubs
- Years: Club
- Collegians; Carrigtwohill GAA
Club titles
| | Football | Hurling |
| Cork titles | 2 | 0 |
College
- Years: College
- University College Cork
College titles
- Sigerson titles: 1
- Fitzgibbon titles: 2
Inter-county*
| Years | County | Apps (scores) |
| 1929 | Cork | 1 (0-00) |
Inter-county titles
- Munster titles: 0
- All-Irelands: 1
- NHL: 0
- *Inter County team apps and scores correct as of 13:17, 7 April 2015.

Michael Donal McCarthy (4 June 1908 – 31 January 1980) was an Irish academic, public servant, university administrator, hurler and Gaelic footballer who played as a right wing-back for the Cork senior teams.

Born in Midleton, County Cork, McCarthy first played competitive hurling during his schooling at Rockwell College. He arrived on the inter-county scene at the age of twenty when he first linked up with the Cork senior football team. He joined the senior panel during the 1928 championship. McCarthy later became a regular member of the hurling team as well, and won one All-Ireland medal.

At club level McCarthy was a two-time championship medallist with Collegians. He also played with Carrigtwohill

Throughout his career McCarthy made one championship appearances. He retired from inter-county hurling following the conclusion of the 1929 championship.

== Early life and education ==
Born in Midleton, County Cork in 1908, McCarthy was educated at Midleton CBS Secondary School before later attending Rockwell College. He was later awarded a first class honours degrees in Bachelor of Arts (mathematics and mathematical physics) at University College Cork in 1928 and an MSc (Mathematical Science) in 1934. He was awarded a PhD in Statistics in 1938.

== Playing career ==
=== Colleges ===
During his schooling at Rockwell College, McCarthy established himself as a key member of the senior hurling team. In 1924 he won a Harty Cup medal following a 7-3 to 3-4 defeat of Limerick CBS.

=== University ===
While studying for a Maths degree at University College Cork, McCarthy was an automatic inclusion for the Collegians hurling and football teams. In 1928 he was a key member of both senior teams. A huge 10-5 to 2-0 defeat of arch rivals University College Dublin secured a Fitzgibbon Cup medal, while the same opposition were accounted for by 3-3 to 1-5 to take the Sigerson Cup title.

The following year McCarthy won a second Fitzgibbon Cup medal following a narrow 8-1 to 7-2 defeat of UCD once again.

=== Club ===
McCarthy first enjoyed success in the club championship as a member of the University College Cork senior football team. In 1927 he won his first championship medal as UCC defeated Macroom by 3-3 to 1-0.

University College Cork retained their title in 1928. A 1-6 to 0-2 defeat of Duhallow United gave McCarthy a second and final championship medal.

=== Inter-county ===
McCarthy first played for Cork as a member of the senior football team. He joined the senior panel in 1928 and won a Munster medal as a non-playing substitute following a 4-3 to 0-4 defeat of Tipperary.

In 1929 McCarthy was drafted onto the Cork senior hurling panel. He collected a Munster medal as a non-playing substitute as Cork made it four-in-a-row following a 4-6 to 2-3 defeat of Waterford. On 1 September 1929 Cork faced Galway in the All-Ireland final for the second successive year. Little had changed in a year as Cork were on the top of their game again. A rout ensued as "the Rebels" and McCarthy, who came on as a substitute, claimed an All-Ireland medal.

== Academic career ==
McCarthy joined the Statistics Branch of the Department of Industry and Commerce in 1930. In 1931 he joined University College Cork as a lecturer in mathematics and was appointed to the Chair of Mathematical Physics in 1944. He joined the newly established Central Statistics Office as Deputy Director in 1949 and became Director in 1957. McCarthy was chairperson of the UN Statistical Commission (a functional commission of the UN Economic and Social Council) from 1960 to 1964. In 1966 he was appointed Director of the Economic and Social Research Institute. McCarthy was appointed President of University College Cork in 1967 and retired on his 70th birthday in 1978.

== Personal life ==
McCarthy was married to Margaret "Pearl" Mulhall and together they had four children: Fionnghuala, Donagh, Brian and Kevin. McCarthy died on 30 January 1980.

== Honours ==
=== Player ===
Rockwell College

- Dr. Harty Cup (1): 1924

University College Cork

- Cork Senior Football Championship (2): 1927, 1928
- Sigerson Cup (1): 1928
- Fitzgibbon Cup (2): 1928, 1929

Cork

- All-Ireland Senior Hurling Championship (1): 1929
- Munster Senior Hurling Championship (1): 1929 (sub)
- Munster Senior Football Championship (1): 1928 (sub)
