= Confidential Information Protection and Statistical Efficiency Act =

US federal law concerning data collection

Confidential Information Protection and Statistical Efficiency Act of 2002
- Long title: An Act to protect the confidentiality of information acquired from the public for statistical purposes, and to permit the exchange of business data among designated statistical agencies for statistical purposes only.
- Acronyms (colloquial): CIPSEA
- Nicknames: E-Government Act of 2002
- Enacted by: the 107th United States Congress
- Effective: December 17, 2002

Citations
- Public law: 107-347
- Statutes at Large: 116 Stat. 2899 aka 116 Stat. 2962

Codification
- Titles amended: 44 U.S.C.: Public Printing and Documents
- U.S.C. sections amended: 44 U.S.C. ch. 35, subch. I § 3501 et seq.

Legislative history
- Introduced in the House as H.R. 5215 by Steve Horn (R–CA) on July 25, 2002; Committee consideration by House Government Reform; Passed the House on November 15, 2002 (passed without objection); Passed the Senate on November 15, 2002 (passed unanimous consent); Signed into law by President George W. Bush on December 17, 2002

The Confidential Information Protection and Statistical Efficiency Act, ("CIPSEA"), is a United States federal law enacted in 2002 as Title V of the E-Government Act of 2002 (Pub. L. 107–347 (text) (PDF), 116 Stat. 2899, 44 U.S.C. § 101).

== Purpose ==
CIPSEA establishes uniform confidentiality protections for information collected for statistical purposes by U.S. statistical agencies, and it allows some data sharing between the Bureau of Labor Statistics, Bureau of Economic Analysis, and Census Bureau. The agencies report to OMB on particular actions related to confidentiality and data sharing.

The law gives the agencies standardized approaches to protecting information from respondents so that it will not be exposed in ways that lead to inappropriate or surprising identification of the respondent. By default the respondent's data is used for statistical purposes only. If the respondent gives informed consent, the data can be put to some other use.

== Statistical implications ==
CIPSEA did not give the statistical agencies new opportunities to use federal data on business taxes in combination with the other sources for statistical purposes. Such data is protected by Title 26 and new laws would be required to enable the other agencies to use such data, which could help them improve the classifications of business into industries and thus improve the accuracy of industry statistics. Later proposals address this prospect.

A reauthorization of CIPSEA in 2018-19 gave the statistical agencies more opportunities to use administrative data for statistical purposes, and required them to more deeply analyze risks to privacy and confidentiality of respondents.
