= Foundations for Evidence-Based Policymaking Act =

U.S. federal law

Evidence Act
- Long title: Foundations for Evidence-Based Policymaking Act of 2018
- Nicknames: Evidence Act
- Enacted by: the 115th United States Congress
- Effective: 01/14/2019

Citations
- Public law: Pub. L. 115–435 (text) (PDF)

Legislative history
- Introduced in the House by Paul Ryan (R–WI) on 10/31/2017; Signed into law by President Donald Trump on 01/14/2019

The Foundations for Evidence-Based Policymaking Act (Evidence Act) is a United States law that establishes processes for the federal government to modernize its data management practices, evidence-building functions, and statistical efficiency to inform policy decisions. The Evidence Act contains three parts ("titles"), which address evidence capacity, open data (OPEN Government Data Act), (Note: The OPEN Government Data Act is Title II of the Foundations for Evidence-Based Policymaking Act) and data confidentiality (the reauthorization of the Confidential Information Protection and Statistical Efficiency Act).

== Legislative history ==
The bill was introduced in the U.S. House of Representatives by former House Speaker Paul Ryan of Wisconsin on October 31, 2017. Senator Patty Murray filed counterpart legislation in the U.S. Senate. Rep. Ryan and Sen. Murray acknowledged that the basis of the legislation was a set of recommendations issued by the U.S. Commission on Evidence-Based Policymaking. The Evidence Act addresses half of the recommendations from that commission.

In November 2017, the House Committee on Oversight and Government Reform advanced the bill, which was approved unanimously by the full House. The Senate advanced a modified version of the bill in December 2018, which returned to the House for a final vote. The U.S. president signed the bill into law on January 14, 2019.

== Implementation ==
Federal agencies have undertaken extensive activities to support implementation of the Evidence Act, beginning in 2019. Many activities are documented in a report from the Data Foundation describing the status of the Evidence Commission's recommendations after 5-years. The federal government also published new resources that describe implementation progress that reflect respective titles of the law. For example:

- Title 1 relates to evidence-building functions and evaluation with additional information available at evaluation.gov
- Title 2 relates to data management and chief data officers with additional information available at cdo.gov and through the Federal Data Strategy
- Title 3 relates to statistical policy with additional information available at statspolicy.gov

== See also ==
- Open data in the United States
- U.S. Commission on Evidence-Based Policymaking, est. March 2016
