= International Association for Official Statistics =

The International Association for Official Statistics (IAOS) is an association founded in 1985. It is an international non-governmental organization (NGO), which was created and developed as a specialized section of the International Statistical Institute (ISI).

It is thus an Association of physical and legal persons who have scientific or professional interest in the field of official statistics. IAOS brings together producers and users of official statistics. IAOS aims to promote the understanding and advancement of official statistics and related subjects and to foster the development of effective and efficient official statistical services through international contacts among individuals and organizations, including users of official statistics as well as research institutes. Its hosts annual conferences. The Association publishes a quarterly statistical journal, the Statistical Journal of the IAOS (SJIAOS), which includes peer reviewed articles relevant to the field of official statistics. An annual Young Statisticians Prize is awarded to the best paper in the field of official statistics written by a young statistician.
