= Federal statistical system =

Network of 13 statistical bodies of the federal government

In the United States, the federal statistical system (FSS) refers to a decentralized network of federal agencies which produce data and official statistics about the people, economy, natural resources, and infrastructure of the country. It is led by the chief statistician of the United States (CSOTUS) and the Interagency Council on Statistical Policy and is composed of 13 principal statistical agencies and 3 recognized statistical units, 24 Statistical Officials (across 24 major cabinet agencies), approximately 100 additional federal statistical programs engaged in statistical activities, and several cross system interagency and advisory bodies.

== Background ==
In contrast to many other countries, the United States does not have a primary statistical agency. Instead, the statistical system is decentralized, with 13 statistical agencies, two of which are independent agencies and the remaining 11 generally located in different government departments. This structure keeps statistical work in close proximity to the various cabinet-level departments that use the information. In addition, three other statistical units of government agencies are recognized by the OMB as having statistical work as part of their mission.

As of fiscal year 2013 (FY13), the 13 principal statistical agencies have statistical activities as their core mission and conduct much of the government's statistical work. A further 89 federal agencies were appropriated at least $500,000 of statistical work in FY11, FY12, or FY13 in conjunction with their primary missions. All together, the total budget allocated to the federal statistical system is estimated to be $6.7 billion for FY13. In FY20, FY21, and FY22, the total budgets allocated to the federal statistical system are estimated to be $12.0, $7.0, and $7.1 billion, respectively. The larger budget size of FY20 is attributable to the 2020 census, amounting to 54% of the FY20 budget.

The federal statistical system is coordinated through the Office of Management and Budget (OMB). OMB establishes and enforces statistical policies and standards, ensures that resources are proposed for priority statistical programs, and approves statistical surveys conducted by the Federal government under the Paperwork Reduction Act. The Chief Statistician of the United States, also housed within OMB, provides oversight, coordination, and guidance for federal statistical activities, working in collaboration with leaders of statistical agencies.

== Centralization efforts ==
To streamline operations and reduce costs, several proposals have been made to consolidate the federal statistical system into fewer agencies, or even a single agency. In 2011, President Barack Obama's proposal to reorganize the U.S. Department of Commerce included placing several statistical agencies under one umbrella.

== Principal statistical agencies ==
Principal statistical agencies
Seal	Agency	Department	Established	FY13 budget est. (millions)	FY22 budget est. (millions)
	Census Bureau	U.S. Department of Commerce	1903	$1,000.4	$1,518.8
	Bureau of Labor Statistics	U.S. Department of Labor	1884	$618.2	$700.1
	National Center for Education Statistics	U.S. Department of Education	1867	$317.0	$333.6
	National Agricultural Statistics Service	U.S. Department of Agriculture	1961	$179.5	$193.7
	National Center for Health Statistics (Centers for Disease Control and Prevention)	U.S. Department of Health and Human Services	1960	$161.8	$175.4
	Energy Information Administration	U.S. Department of Energy	1977	$116.4	$126.8
	Bureau of Economic Analysis	U.S. Department of Commerce	1972	$96.5	$112.7
	Economic Research Service	U.S. Department of Agriculture	1961	$77.4	$90.6
	Bureau of Justice Statistics	U.S. Department of Justice	1979	$68.0	$54.4
	National Center for Science and Engineering Statistics (National Science Foundation)	Independent agency	1950	$42.6	$72.6
	Statistics of Income Division (Internal Revenue Service)	U.S. Department of the Treasury	1862	$39.5	$41.3
	Bureau of Transportation Statistics	U.S. Department of Transportation	1992	$38.0	$26.0
	Office of Research, Evaluation, and Statistics (Social Security Administration)	Independent agency	1935	$29.3	$37.8

Total staff levels of principal statistical agencies 2019-2022
Agency	2019	2020	2021	2022
Census Bureau	46,117	317,661	37,573	17,403
Bureau of Labor Statistics	2,193	2,200	2,228	2,360
National Center for Education Statistics	93	93	96	98
National Agricultural Statistics Service	894	870	892	911
National Center for Health Statistics (Centers for Disease Control and Prevention)	501	481	486	481
Energy Information Administration	333	359	359	366
Bureau of Economic Analysis	503	455	495	495
Economic Research Service	316	329	275	332
Bureau of Justice Statistics	56	50	53	53
National Center for Science and Engineering Statistics (National Science Foundation)	57	57	54	54
Statistics of Income Division (Internal Revenue Service)	139	140	144	138
Bureau of Transportation Statistics	60	61	63	80
Office of Research, Evaluation, and Statistics (Social Security Administration)	80	70	69	68

Number of Statisticians, Economists, Research Scientists, and Other Statistical Personnel in Principal Statistical Agencies Year 2022
Agency	Statisticians	Economists	Research Scientists	Other Statistical Personnel
Census Bureau	2,252	117	0	0
Bureau of Labor Statistics	165	1,169	10	370
National Center for Education Statistics	55	1	0	0
National Agricultural Statistics Service	591	0	1	0
National Center for Health Statistics (Centers for Disease Control and Prevention)	168	0	87	0
Energy Information Administration	84	84	66	10
Bureau of Economic Analysis	8	284	0	51
Economic Research Service	3	248	0	3
Bureau of Justice Statistics	33	0	0	0
National Center for Science and Engineering Statistics (National Science Foundation)	25	3	0	14
Statistics of Income Division (Internal Revenue Service)	21	42	0	1
Bureau of Transportation Statistics	24	15	0	41
Office of Research, Evaluation, and Statistics (Social Security Administration)	2	17	17	32

== Statistical units ==
These are subcomponents of agencies recognized by the OMB as having statistical work as part of their mission:

- Microeconomic Surveys Unit (Federal Reserve Board of Governors)
- Center for Behavioral Health Statistics and Quality (Substance Abuse and Mental Health Services Administration, Department of Health and Human Services)
- National Animal Health Monitoring System (Animal and Plant Health Inspection Service, Department of Agriculture)

== Cross system bodies ==
=== Interagency Council on Statistical Policy ===
Started in 1989, the Interagency Council on Statistical Policy (ICSP) was originally created to improve communication among the heads of the principal statistical agencies, and later was charged with advising and assisting the CSOTUS. The Evidence Act expanded membership to include the newly established Statistical Officials across major cabinet agencies, 11 of which are also heads of principal statistical agencies. The ICSP, led by the CSOTUS, supports implementation of the statistical system's vision to operate as a seamless system, working together to provide strategic vision and robust implementation in support of the U.S. Federal statistical system's critical longstanding — and expanding — role for supporting evidence-based decision-making. For example, the ICSP sets strategic goals for modernizing the statistical system, as well as enhancing coordination and collaboration across the system, recognizing the efficiencies and advancements possible when taking advantage of the whole system's statistical infrastructure and expertise.

=== Federal Committee on Statistical Methodology ===
The mission of the Federal Committee on Statistical Methodology (FCSM) includes advising the CSOTUS and ICSP on methodological and statistical issues that affect the quality of Federal data. The FCSM sponsors regular conferences, hosts seminars and workshops, sponsors interest groups on statistical methodology topics of broad Federal interest, and develops best practices and tools to support the Federal statistical system and the broader Federal data community.

=== Federal Economic Statistics Advisory Committee ===
The Federal Economic Statistics Advisory Committee (FESAC), established in 1999, advises the Directors of the Bureau of Economic Analysis and the Bureau of the Census and the Commissioner of the Bureau of Labor Statistics on statistical methodology and other technical matters related to the collection, tabulation, and analysis of federal economic statistics. It consists of approximately 16 unpaid members, from the fields of economics, statistics, survey methodology, behavioral science, and computer science. An example of their work was to identify ways to improve response rates for job surveys from the Bureau of Labor Statistics. As of February 28, 2025, the committee was terminated by Commerce Secretary Howard Lutnick.

== See also ==
- Federal Statistical Research Data Centers
- Statistical Policy Directive
