= Vincent Barabba =

American market researcher (1934–2026)

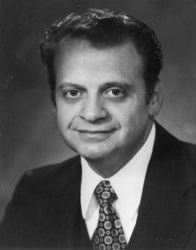

14th Director of the United States Census Bureau
- In office 1973–1976
- President: Richard Nixon; Gerald Ford
- Preceded by: George Hay Brown
- Succeeded by: Manuel D. Plotkin
- In office 1979–1981 (Acting)
- President: Jimmy Carter
- Preceded by: Manuel D. Plotkin
- Succeeded by: Bruce Chapman

Personal details
- Born: September 6, 1934 Chicago, Illinois, U.S.
- Died: September 2026 (aged 92)
- Education: California State University, Northridge; University of California, Los Angeles

Vincent Barabba (September 6, 1934 – September 2026) was an American market researcher, author, former head of the United States Census Bureau, and the chairman and co-founder of Market Insight Corporation. He was known for his work in the field of market research and opinion polling.

== Biography ==
Born in Chicago, Illinois, Barabba was awarded a bachelor's degree in marketing in 1962 from California State University, Northridge and, in 1964, an MBA in marketing from the University of California, Los Angeles. He was also awarded an Honorary Doctor of Laws in 2012 by California State University, Northridge.

Beginning as political campaign survey researcher in the 1964 California Republican primary between Nelson Rockefeller and Barry Goldwater, Barabba moved on to become a business market researcher (eventually Director of Market Intelligence) for Xerox Corp. and Eastman Kodak. He co-founded and was chairman of Market Insight Corporation. Until 2003, he was General Manager of Corporate Strategy and Knowledge Development at General Motors, where he conceived and devised OnStar and MyProductAdvisor.

He was a Past President of the American Statistical Association, and served twice as head of the US Census Bureau (the only to be appointed by two Presidents of different political parties), later serving as a Commissioner of the California Citizens Redistricting Commission. He was chairman of the State of the USA, a nonprofit corporation providing quality information to the American public on societal, economic, and environmental conditions.

Barabba died in September 2026, shortly after his 92nd birthday.

=== Awards ===
In recognition of his private and public sector performance, Barabba was awarded:

- Fellow of the American Statistical Association, 1976
- Lifetime Member of the American Statistical Association, 2013
- Induction into the Market Research Council's Hall of Fame
- The American Marketing Association’s Parlin Award for leadership (1996) in the application of science to marketing research
- The MIT/General Motors Buck Weaver Award for individuals who have contributed significantly to the advancement of theory and practice in marketing science
- The System Dynamics Society’s Applications Award for the best “real world” application of system dynamics
- The American Marketing Association’s Explor Award granted to organizations that have demonstrated the most innovative uses of technology in applications that advance research
- The Certificate of Distinguished Service for Contribution to the Federal Statistical System from the US Office of Management and Budget

== Publications ==
Barabba has authored or co-authored numerous books and articles, including:

- 1968 “Political Campaign Management: Myth and Reality” The Ethics of Controversy: Politics and Protest. Proceedings of the First Annual Symposium on Issues in Public Communication, held at the University of Kansas June 27–28
- 1983 (With Mason, R.O. and Mitroff, I.I.) “Federal Statistics in a Complex Environment: The Case of the 1980 Federal Census,” The American Statistician, Volume 37, No. 3, Washington, DC: The American Statistical Association
- 1985 “Steel Axes for Stone Age Men” in: Buzzell, R., Marketing in an Electronic Age, 75th Anniversary Harvard Business School Research Colloquium, Boston: Harvard Business School Press
- 1991 (With Zaltman, G.) Hearing the Voice of the Market: Competitive Advantage through Creative Use of Market Information, Boston: Harvard Business School Press
- 1994 “Never Say the Model Says. The Role of Models in Managerial Decision Making” in Wallace, W. Ethics in Modeling, New York: Pergamon Press
- 1998 “Revisiting Plato’s Cave: Business Design in an Age of Uncertainty,” in Tapscott, D. et al., eds., Blue Print for the Digital Economy, New York: McGraw-Hill
- 2002 (With Huber, C., Cooke, F., Pudar, N., Smith, J., and Paich, M.) “A Multi-Method Approach for Creating New Business Models: The General Motors OnStar Project”, Interfaces, 32 (1), pp. 20–34
- 2002 (With Pourdehnad J. and Ackoff, R.) “Above and Beyond Knowledge Management” in Chun, W. C. and Bontis, N. (eds) The Strategic Management of Intellectual Capital and Organization Knowledge, Oxford: Oxford University Press, pp. 359–369
- 2004, Surviving Transformation, New York: Oxford University Press. pp. 170–171
- 2011, The Decision Loom: a design for interactive decision-making in organizations
