= Thomas Mesenbourg =

American statistician and economist

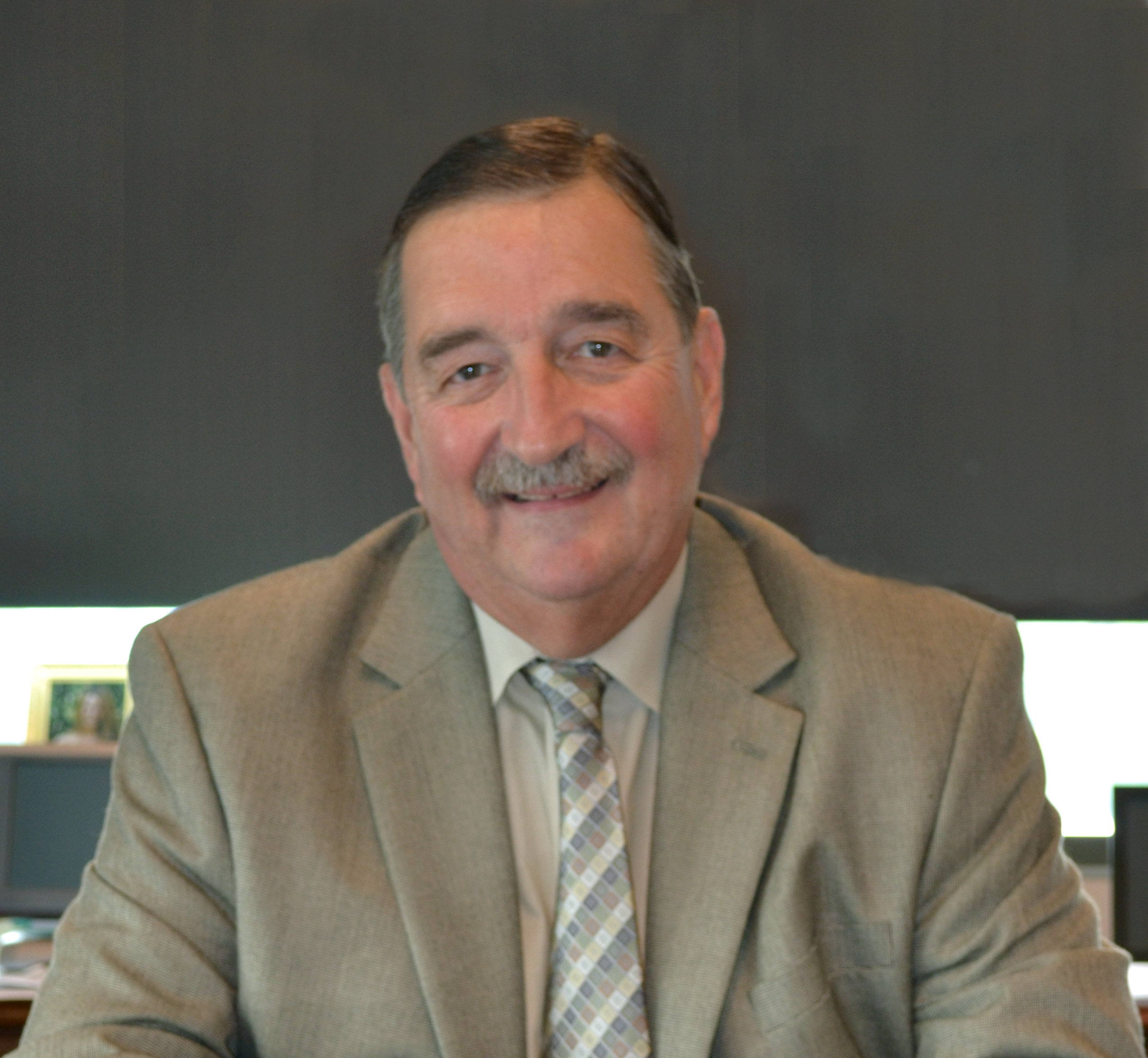
Thomas Mesenbourg

Thomas L. Mesenbourg is an American statistician and economist who was the acting director of the United States Census Bureau from August 12, 2012 to August 8, 2013. Previously, Mesenbourg served as the deputy director and chief operating officer of the Census Bureau from May 2008 until August 2012. He also served as acting director from January to July 2009.

== Education and career ==
Mesenbourg earned his bachelor's degree in economics from Boston University in 1968 and his master's from Penn State in 1971. He lives in La Plata, Maryland, with his wife, Faith. They have two daughters and one grandchild.

Mesenbourg has worked at the Census Bureau since 1972. He became chief of the Economic Census Staff in 1986 and was responsible for the planning and processing of the 1987 United States Census of Agriculture and 1987 United States Economic Census. He became chief of the Economic Census and Surveys Division in October 1991, directing the planning and processing of the 1992 Census of Agriculture and 1992 Economic Census. During his time as division chief, he was chairman of the Statistics 2000 Task Force, a multiagency group that identified opportunities for reducing business reporting burdens, cutting costs and improving efficiency. He also planned and organized the 1991 International Conference on Classification that led to the development of the North American Industry Classification System. He served as the Assistant Associate Director for Economic Programs from 1994 to 2005, managing eight divisions, 1,300 employees and an annual budget of more than $230 million. Upon his appointment as Associate Director for Economic Programs in 2005, Mesenbourg oversaw programs including the economic census and the census of governments, and more than 100 monthly, quarterly and annual surveys. He served as the adviser to the Census Bureau director and deputy director on economic statistics programs and provided counsel as to the scope, quality, content and methodology of economic statistics programs.

In 2011, Mesenbourg was the recipient of the Julius Shiskin Memorial Award for Economic Statistics. He was also awarded the Presidential Rank Award in 2004, the government's highest award for career executives.

Political offices
Preceded by Steve H. Murdock	Director of the Census Bureau (acting); January 2009 - July 2009	Succeeded by Robert Groves
Preceded by Robert Groves	Director of the Census Bureau (acting); August 2012 - August 2013	Succeeded by John H. Thompson
