= Ron S. Jarmin =

American economist (born 1964)

Ron Jarmin
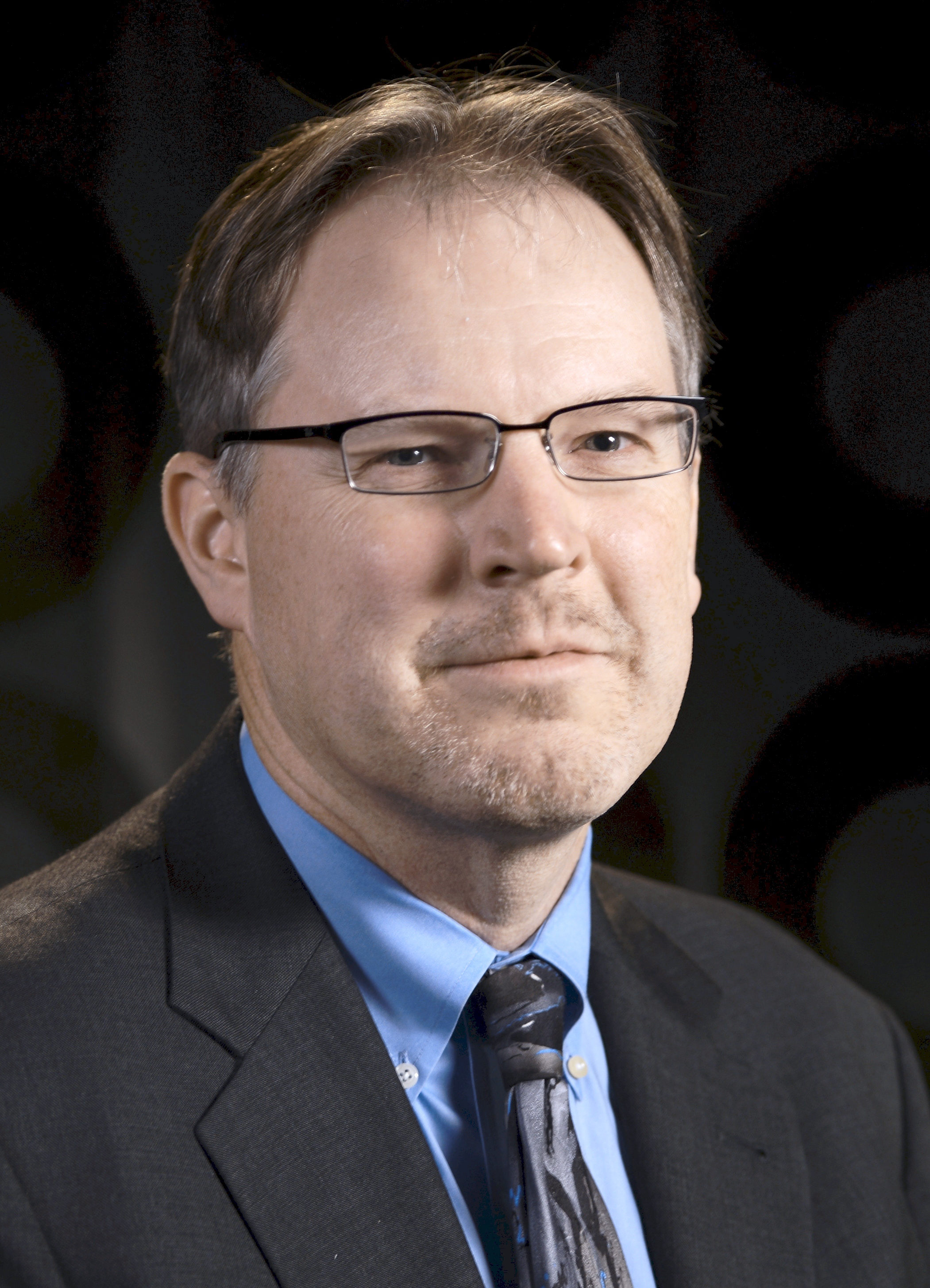

Acting Director of the United States Census Bureau
- In office January 31, 2025 – September 19, 2025
- President: Donald Trump
- Preceded by: Robert Santos
- Succeeded by: George Cook (acting)
- In office January 20, 2021 – January 5, 2022
- President: Joe Biden
- Preceded by: Steven Dillingham
- Succeeded by: Robert Santos
- In office June 30, 2017 – January 7, 2019
- President: Donald Trump
- Preceded by: John H. Thompson
- Succeeded by: Steven Dillingham

Deputy Director and COO of the United States Census Bureau
- In office 2018–present

Personal details
- Born: Ronald S. Jarmin; October 31, 1964 (age 61)
- Education: Central Washington University (BA); University of Oregon (PhD)

Ronald S. Jarmin (born October 31, 1964) is an American economist who served as the deputy director and the chief operating officer of the United States Census Bureau until May 2026 according to his announcement on social media. He previously served as acting director from January to September 2025 following the resignation of Robert Santos, from 2021 to 2022 following the resignation of Steven Dillingham, and from 2017 to 2019 following the resignation of John H. Thompson.

== Biography ==
Jarmin earned a B.A. from Central Washington University in 1987 and a PhD from the University of Oregon in 1992, both in economics. Since joining the Census Bureau in 1992 he has held various positions including Chief of the Center for Economic Studies, Chief Economist, and associate director for Economic Programs.

Jarmin led the team for the 2017 Economic Census, overseeing a move to 100 percent Internet data collection and leveraging enterprise investments to minimize system, application and dissemination costs. Data products from the Economic Census provide the foundation for key measures of economic performance, including the nation's gross domestic product.

An elected Fellow of the American Statistical Association in 2017, he has published papers in the areas of industrial organization, business dynamics, entrepreneurship, technology and firm performance, urban economics, data access and statistical disclosure avoidance.

Government offices
| Preceded by John H. Thompson | Director of the U.S. Census Bureau; Acting; 2017–2019 | Succeeded by Steven Dillingham |
| Preceded by Steven Dillingham | Director of the U.S. Census Bureau; Acting; 2021–2022 | Succeeded by Robert Santos |
