= 1860 United States census =

Eighth US census

- June 1, 1860
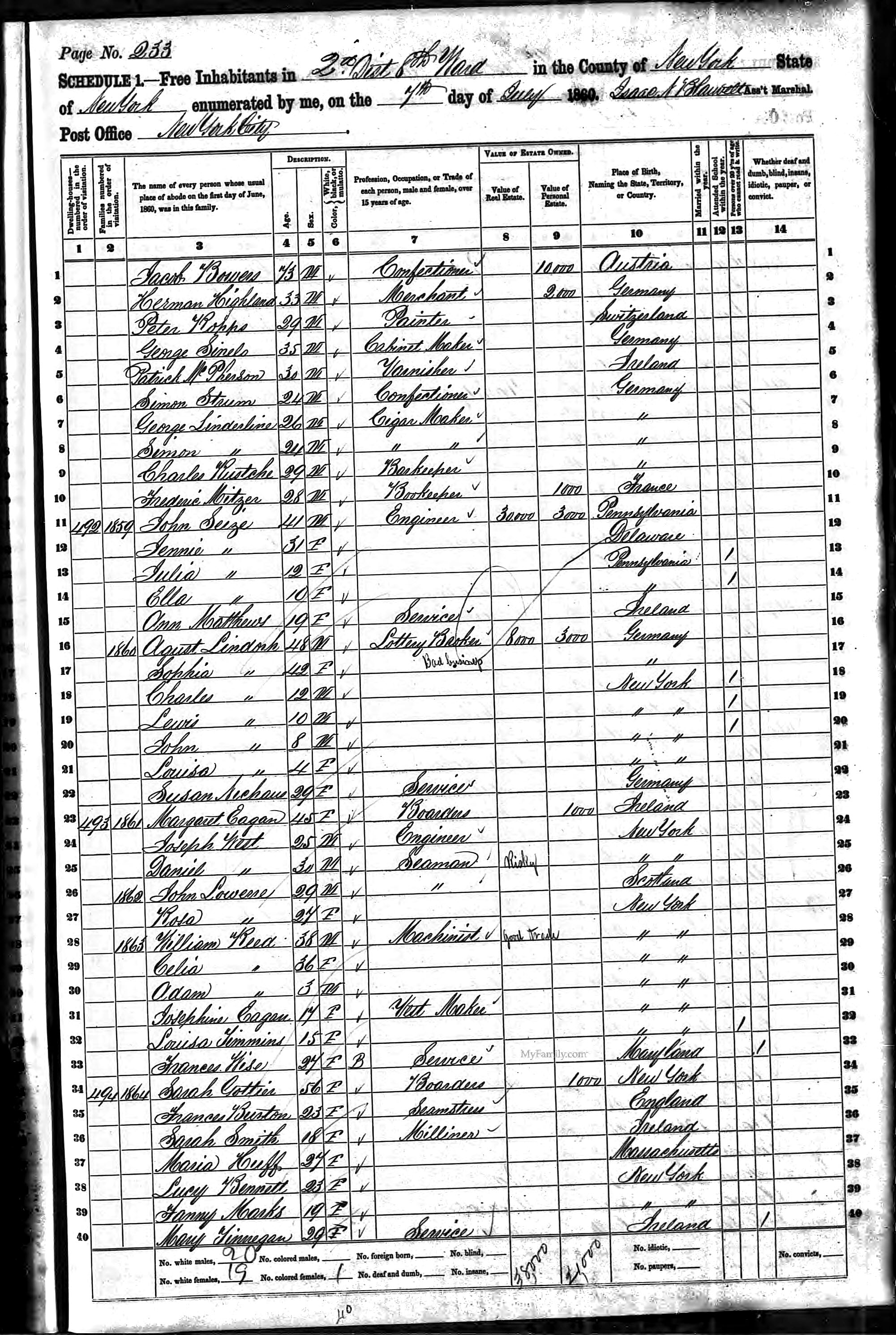
- 1860 U.S. census from the state of New York

General information
- Country: United States
- Authority: Census Office

Results
- Total population: 31,443,321 (▲35.6%)
- Most populous state: New York; 3,880,735
- Least populous state: Oregon; 52,465

The 1860 United States census was the eighth census conducted in the United States, starting June 1, 1860, and lasting five months. It determined the population of the United States to be 31,443,867 in 33 states and 10 organized territories. This was an increase of 35.6 percent over the 23,191,876 persons enumerated during the 1850 census. The total population included 3,953,760 slaves.

By the time the 1860 census returns were ready for tabulation, the nation was sinking into the American Civil War. As a result, census superintendent Joseph C. G. Kennedy and his staff produced only an abbreviated set of public reports, without graphic or cartographic representations. The statistics did allow the census staff to produce a cartographic display, including preparing maps of Southern states, for Union field commanders. These maps displayed militarily vital topics, including the white population, slave population, predominant agricultural products (by county), and rail and post road transportation routes.

This census saw Philadelphia regain its position as the second-most-populous American city (which it had lost to Baltimore in 1820), due to the Act of Consolidation, 1854, merging many smaller surrounding townships, such as Spring Garden, Northern Liberties, and Kensington, into the main city of Philadelphia. Philadelphia would lose its position as the second-most-populous American city to Chicago in 1890.

== Census questions ==
The 1860 census Schedule 1 (Free Inhabitants) was one of two schedules that counted the population of the United States; the other was Schedule 2 (Slave Inhabitants).

Schedule 1 collected the following information:

Column	Title	Notes
1	Dwelling-houses – numbered in the order of visitation.	
2	Families numbered in the order of visitation	
3	The name of every person whose usual place of abode on the first day of June 1860, was in this family.	
4	Description: Age.	
5	Description: Sex.	M or F
6	Description: Color, (White, black, or mulatto).	W, B or M
7	Profession, Occupation, or Trade of each person, male and female, over 15 years of age.	
8	Value of Estate Owned: Value of Real Estate.	
9	Value of Estate Owned: Value of Personal Estate.	
10	Place of Birth, Naming the State, Territory, or Country.	
11	Married within the year.	Marked with '/'
12	Attended School within the year.	Marked with '/'
13	Persons over 20 years of age who can not read and write.	Marked with '/'
14	Whether deaf and dumb, blind, insane, idiotic, pauper, or convict.	

Schedule 2 (Slave Inhabitants) collected the following information:

Column	Title	Notes
1	Name of slave owner	
2	Number of slaves	
3	Age	
4	Sex	
5	Color	
6	Fugitive from the state	Marked with '/'
7	Number Manumitted	
8	Deaf and dumb, blind, insane, or idiotic	
9	Number of slave houses	

== Data availability ==
Full documentation for the 1860 population census, including microdata, census forms and enumerator instructions, is available from the Integrated Public Use Microdata Series (IPUMS). Aggregate data for small areas, together with compatible cartographic boundary files, can be downloaded from the National Historical Geographic Information System.

== Common occupations ==
National data reveals that farmers (owners and tenants) made up nearly 10% of utilized occupations. Farm laborers (wage workers) represent the next highest percent with 3.2%, followed by general laborers at 3.0%.

More localized data shows that other occupations were common. In the town of Essex, Massachusetts, a large section of the women in the labor force were devoted to shoe-binding, while for men the common occupations were farming and shoe-making. This heavy demand of shoe-related labor reinforces the high demand for rigorous physical laborers in the economy, as supported by the data of very large amounts of farm related work as compared to most other labor options.

IPUMS' data also notes that the share of the population that had been enrolled in school or marked as "Student" stood at 0.2%. This demonstrates a small rate of growth, if any, in the proficiency of the human capital of the time—the skill set a worker has to apply to the labor force, which can increase total output through increased efficiency.

The census of 1860 was the last in which much of Southern wealth was held as slaves—still legally considered property.

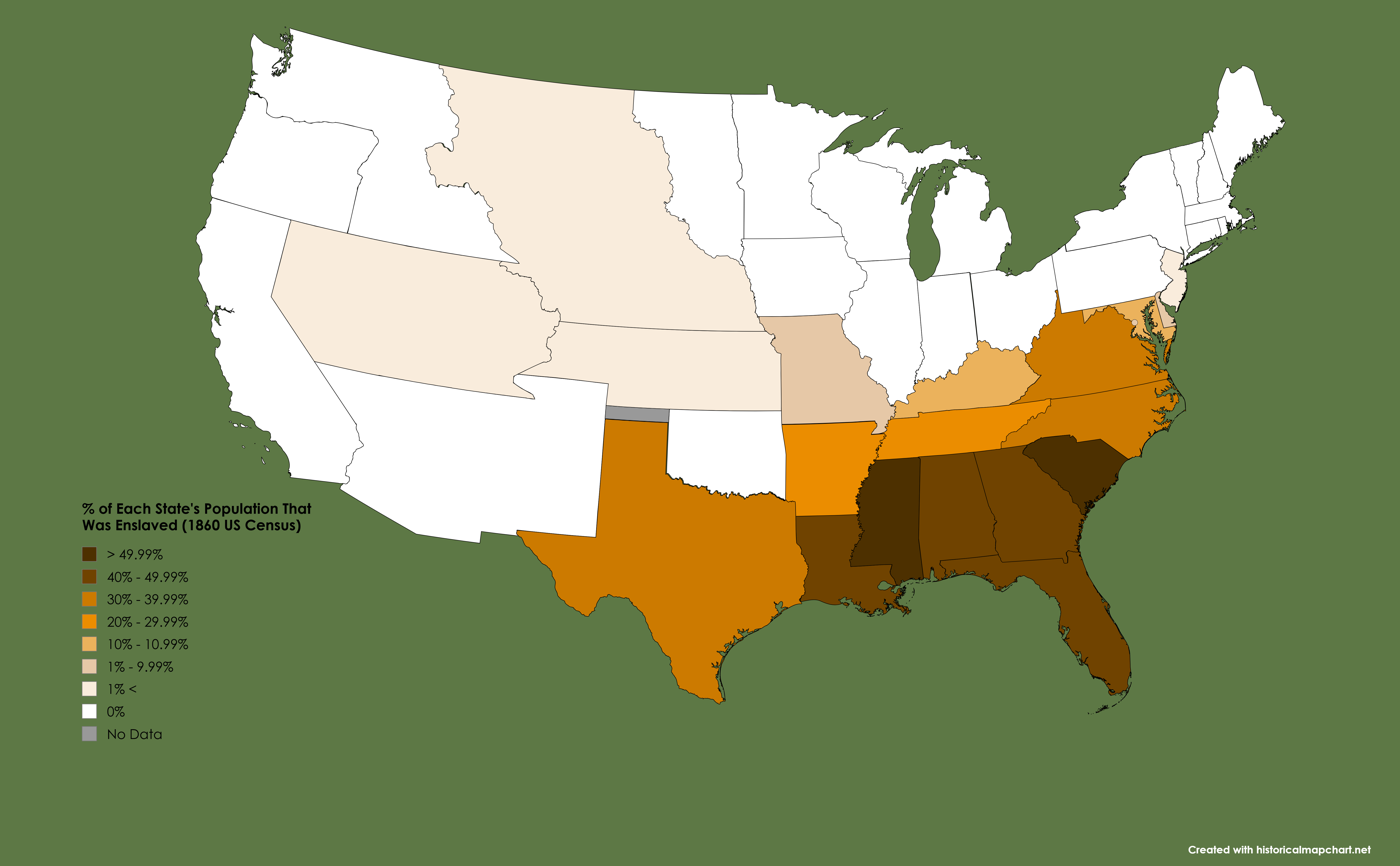
This map displays the percentage of each U.S. subdivision in 1860s' population that was enslaved.

== Population of U.S. states and territories ==
Population of the US States and Territories
Rank	State	Free Population	Slave Population	Population	Percentage Enslaved
01	New York	3,880,735	0	3,880,735	0
02	Pennsylvania	2,906,215	0	2,906,215	0
03	Ohio	2,339,511	0	2,339,511	0
04	Illinois	1,711,951	0	1,711,951	0
05	Virginia	1,105,453	490,865	1,596,318	30.7
06	Indiana	1,350,428	0	1,350,428	0
07	Massachusetts	1,231,066	0	1,231,066	0
08	Missouri	1,067,081	114,931	1,182,012	9.7
09	Kentucky	930,201	225,483	1,155,684	19.5
10	Tennessee	834,082	275,719	1,109,801	24.8
11	Georgia	595,088	462,198	1,057,286	43.7
12	North Carolina	661,563	331,059	992,622	33.4
13	Alabama	529,121	435,080	964,201	45.1
14	Mississippi	354,674	436,631	791,305	55.2
15	Wisconsin	775,881	0	775,881	0
16	Michigan	749,113	0	749,113	0
17	Louisiana	376,276	331,726	708,002	46.9
18	South Carolina	301,302	402,406	703,708	57.2
19	Maryland	599,860	87,189	687,049	12.7
20	Iowa	674,913	0	674,913	0
21	New Jersey	672,017	18	672,035	0.003
22	Maine	628,279	0	628,279	0
23	Texas	421,649	182,566	604,215	30.2
24	Connecticut	460,147	0	460,147	0
25	Arkansas	324,335	111,115	435,450	25.5
26	California	379,994	0	379,994	0
27	New Hampshire	326,073	0	326,073	0
28	Vermont	315,098	0	315,098	0
29	Rhode Island	174,620	0	174,620	0
30	Minnesota	172,023	0	172,023	0
31	Florida	78,679	61,745	140,424	44.0
32	Delaware	110,418	1,798	112,216	1.6
33	Oregon	52,465	0	52,465	0
X	Kansas Territory	107,204	2	107,206	0.002
X	New Mexico Territory	93,516	0	93,516	0
X	District of Columbia	71,985	3,185	75,080	4.2
X	Utah Territory	40,184	29	40,273	0.07
X	Colorado Territory	34,277	0	34,277	0
X	Nebraska Territory	28,826	15	28,841	0.05
X	Washington Territory	11,594	0	11,594	0
X	Nevada Territory	6,857	0	6,857	0
X	Dakota Territory	4,837	0	4,837	0

== City rankings ==
Rank	City	State	Population	Region (2016)
01	New York	New York	813,669	Northeast
02	Philadelphia	Pennsylvania	565,529	Northeast
03	Brooklyn	New York	266,661	Northeast
04	Baltimore	Maryland	212,418	South
05	Boston	Massachusetts	177,840	Northeast
06	New Orleans	Louisiana	168,675	South
07	Cincinnati	Ohio	161,044	Midwest
08	St. Louis	Missouri	160,773	Midwest
09	Chicago	Illinois	112,172	Midwest
10	Buffalo	New York	81,129	Northeast
11	Newark	New Jersey	71,941	Northeast
12	Louisville	Kentucky	68,033	South
13	Albany	New York	62,367	Northeast
14	Washington	District of Columbia	61,122	South
15	San Francisco	California	56,802	West
16	Providence	Rhode Island	50,666	Northeast
17	Pittsburgh	Pennsylvania	49,221	Northeast
18	Rochester	New York	48,204	Northeast
19	Detroit	Michigan	45,619	Midwest
20	Milwaukee	Wisconsin	45,246	Midwest
21	Cleveland	Ohio	43,417	Midwest
22	Charleston	South Carolina	40,522	South
23	New Haven	Connecticut	39,267	Northeast
24	Troy	New York	39,235	Northeast
25	Richmond	Virginia	37,910	South
26	Lowell	Massachusetts	36,827	Northeast
27	Mobile	Alabama	29,258	South
28	Jersey City	New Jersey	29,226	Northeast
29	Hartford	Connecticut	29,152	Northeast
30	Allegheny	Pennsylvania	28,702	Northeast
31	Syracuse	New York	28,119	Northeast
32	Portland	Maine	26,341	Northeast
33	Cambridge	Massachusetts	26,060	Northeast
34	Roxbury	Massachusetts	25,137	Northeast
35	Charlestown	Massachusetts	25,065	Northeast
36	Worcester	Massachusetts	24,960	Northeast
37	Reading	Pennsylvania	23,162	Northeast
38	Memphis	Tennessee	22,623	South
39	Utica	New York	22,529	Northeast
40	New Bedford	Massachusetts	22,300	Northeast
41	Savannah	Georgia	22,292	South
42	Salem	Massachusetts	22,252	Northeast
43	Wilmington	Delaware	21,258	South
44	Manchester	New Hampshire	20,107	Northeast
45	Dayton	Ohio	20,081	Midwest
46	Paterson	New Jersey	19,586	Northeast
47	Lynn	Massachusetts	19,083	Northeast
48	Indianapolis	Indiana	18,611	Midwest
49	Columbus	Ohio	18,554	Midwest
50	Petersburg	Virginia	18,266	South
51	Lawrence	Massachusetts	17,639	Northeast
52	Lancaster	Pennsylvania	17,603	Northeast
53	Trenton	New Jersey	17,228	Northeast
54	Nashville	Tennessee	16,988	South
55	Oswego	New York	16,816	Northeast
56	Kingston	New York	16,640	Northeast
57	Covington	Kentucky	16,471	South
58	Bangor	Maine	16,407	Northeast
59	Taunton	Massachusetts	15,376	Northeast
60	Springfield	Massachusetts	15,199	Northeast
61	Poughkeepsie	New York	14,726	Northeast
62	Norfolk	Virginia	14,620	South
63	Camden	New Jersey	14,358	Northeast
64	Wheeling	Virginia	14,083	South
65	Norwich	Connecticut	14,048	Northeast
66	Peoria	Illinois	14,045	Midwest
67	Fall River	Massachusetts	14,026	Northeast
68	Sacramento	California	13,785	West
69	Toledo	Ohio	13,768	Midwest
70	Newtown	New York	13,725	Northeast
71	Quincy	Illinois	13,718	Midwest
72	Harrisburg	Pennsylvania	13,405	Northeast
73	Newburyport	Massachusetts	13,401	Northeast
74	Chelsea	Massachusetts	13,395	Northeast
75	Bridgeport	Connecticut	13,299	Northeast
76	Smithfield	Rhode Island	13,283	Northeast
77	Dubuque	Iowa	13,000	Midwest
78	Alexandria	Virginia	12,652	South
79	New Albany	Indiana	12,647	Midwest
80	Newburgh	New York	12,578	Northeast
81	Augusta	Georgia	12,493	South
82	Hempstead	New York	12,376	Northeast
83	Yonkers	New York	11,848	Northeast
84	North Providence	Rhode Island	11,818	Northeast
85	Elizabeth	New Jersey	11,567	Northeast
86	Evansville	Indiana	11,484	Midwest
87	Davenport	Iowa	11,267	Midwest
88	New Brunswick	New Jersey	11,256	Northeast
89	Auburn	New York	10,986	Northeast
90	Gloucester	Massachusetts	10,904	Northeast
91	Concord	New Hampshire	10,896	Northeast
92	Lockport	New York	10,871	Northeast
93	Newport	Rhode Island	10,508	Northeast
94	Saint Paul	Minnesota	10,401	Midwest
95	Flushing	New York	10,188	Northeast
96	New London	Connecticut	10,115	Northeast
97	Cortlandt	New York	10,074	Northeast
98	Nashua	New Hampshire	10,065	Northeast
99	Newport	Kentucky	10,046	South
100	Waterbury	Connecticut	10,004	Northeast

== See also ==
- American Civil War
- Cotton gin
- Human capital
- Joseph C. G. Kennedy, census supervisor
