= Commission on Key National Indicators =

The Commission on Key National Indicators was established in a provision of the 2010 Patient Protection and Affordable Care Act to oversee the creation of a system of citizen statistics known as a "Key National Indicators System". The statistics themselves are to be brought together in a publicly accessible website run by the nonprofit corporation The State of The USA. State of the USA, in turn, collects the information for its statistics from the United States National Academy of Sciences.

== Membership ==
The commission is made up of eight members, appointed equally (two each) by the leaders of both parties in the Senate and the House of Representatives. According to the legislation creating the commission, appointees shall "have shown dedication to improving civic dialogue and decision-making through the wide use of scientific evidence and factual information."

== Official Duties ==
The commission is charged with entering into contracts with the National Academy of Sciences (NAS) to create a Key National Indicators System, providing advice and oversight for the system, and coordinating with Federal government users and information providers to assure relevant and high-quality data. The NAS, in its annual Report to Congress, summarized its role as:

Review research on the selection of a set of key national indicators, determine how to implement and establish a key national indicator system, and report annually to the Commission on Key National Indicators any findings and recommendations.

The Key National Indicators System is to feature a website allowing free public access to a database of key national indicators. Selection of issue areas to be included in the system and measures to be used for the key indicators will be the responsibility of NAS through a multi-sector, multi-disciplinary process. As authorized in the legislation, NAS intends to work with an independent non-profit institution, The State of the USA, to implement the web site.

== Commissioners ==
=== Current ===
- Nicholas Eberstadt
- Stephen B. Heintz
- Wade Horn
- Ikram Khan
- Dean Ornish
- Tomas J. Philipson
- Marta Tienda

=== Former ===
- Marcus Peacock (resigned upon taking position as minority staff director on the Senate Budget Committee)
