= Director of the United States Census Bureau =

Chief administrator of the United States Census Bureau

Director of the Bureau of the Census

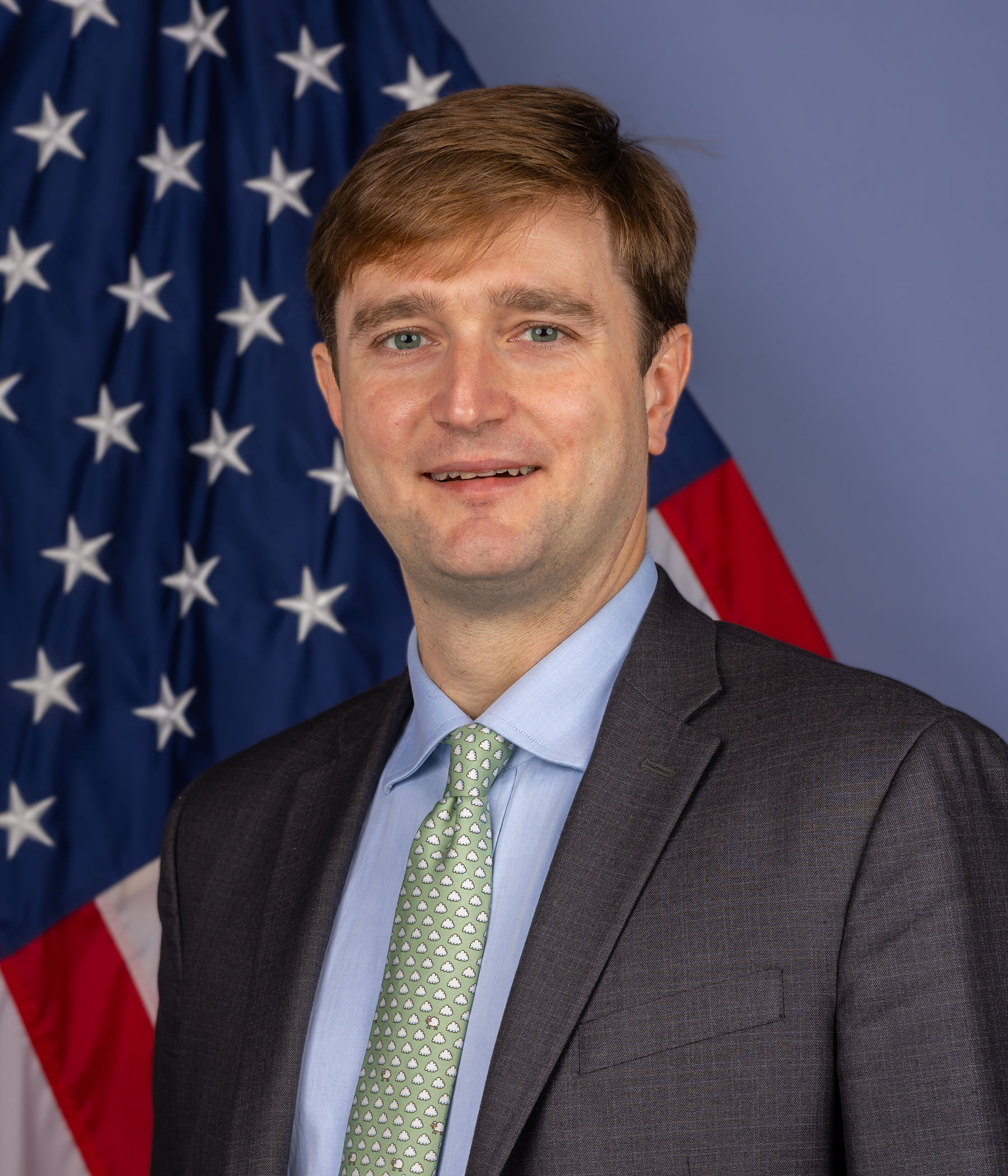
- Incumbent; George Cook (acting) since September 19, 2025
- Appointer: President of the United States

The director of the Bureau of the Census is the chief administrator of the United States Census Bureau. The officeholder is appointed by the president of the United States and confirmed by the United States Senate and assisted by the Deputy Director of the United States Census Bureau.

== History of the office ==
The nominal head of the early censuses was the Secretary of State, but management responsibility was actually devolved to the U.S. marshal in each state. These marshals collected and tabulated their own returns; the Secretary of State only oversaw the final compilation and tabulation of the data.

By 1840, the increasing standardization of census questionnaires and the enumeration process made it clear that more leadership at the federal level was necessary. Secretary of State John Forsyth appointed William Augustus Weaver as the first "superintending clerk of the census" in that year. Weaver and his successors oversaw the technical aspects of the census, including designing questionnaires, and more closely managed the tabulation process.

By 1870, the leader of the Census Office was the "superintendent of the census." The superintendent oversaw the entire census-taking process, and usually held the position from a year before the census until the final tabulations had been published.

After the Census Office became a permanent agency in 1902, the first director was the incumbent superintendent, William Rush Merriam. He set the standard for many directors of the U.S. Census Bureau over the next hundred years by focusing on external issues such as congressional testimony and leaving technical operations to the experts.

In 2012, the Presidential Appointment Efficiency and Streamlining Act of 2011 set the term for the Census Bureau director at five years; the director can serve for up to two terms. The Census director must also "have a demonstrated ability in managing large organizations and experience in the collection, analysis, and use of statistical data."

== Chronology of Census Bureau leadership ==
The following is a chronological list of those who supervised the Census of the United States.

=== Secretaries of State ===
The Secretary of State was the nominal director of the first five censuses, responsible for supervision and compilation of each U.S. marshal's tabulation. In reality, these cabinet officers did very little actual directing. The authorizing legislation for most early censuses was very specific, and the marshals oversaw the actual enumeration process.

Order	Image	Name	Census year
1		Thomas Jefferson	1790
2		John Marshall	1800
3		Robert Smith	1810
4		John Quincy Adams	1820
5		Martin Van Buren	1830

=== Superintending Clerks of the Census ===
Beginning in 1840 and continuing for the succeeding three censuses, operations and oversight were directed by a superintending clerk of the census. Also, the Census Office shut down after it finished publishing the results of each census. Because of this, there were several periods in the nineteenth century in which there was no director.

Order	Image	Name	In office
1		William Augustus Weaver	1840
2		Joseph Camp Griffith Kennedy	1850–1853
3		James Dunwoody Brownson DeBow	1853–1855
4		Joseph Camp Griffith Kennedy	1860–1865

=== Superintendents of the Census ===
The Census Bureau maintains biographies in their Agency History section.

Order	Image	Name	In office
1		Francis Amasa Walker	1870
2		Francis Amasa Walker	1879–1881
3		Charles W. Seaton	1881–1885
4		Robert Percival Porter	1889–1893
5		Carroll D. Wright	1893–1897
6		William Rush Merriam	1899–1902

=== Directors of the Census Bureau ===
The Census Bureau became a permanent agency in 1902.

Order	Image	Name	In office
1		William Rush Merriam	1902–1903
2		Simon Newton Dexter North	1903–1909
3		Edward Dana Durand	1909–1913
4		William J. Harris	1913–1915
5		Samuel Lyle Rogers	1915–1921
6		William Mott Steuart	1921–1933
7		William Lane Austin	1933–1941
8		James Clyde Capt	1941–1949
9		Roy Victor Peel	1950–1953
10		Robert Wilbur Burgess	1953–1961
11		Richard M. Scammon	1961–1965
12		A. Ross Eckler	1965–1969
13		George Hay Brown	1969–1973
14		Vincent Barabba	1973–1976
15		Manuel D. Plotkin	1977–1979
–		Vincent Barabba	1979–1981
16		Bruce Chapman	1981–1983
17		John G. Keane	1984–1987
18		Barbara Everitt Bryant	1989–1993
19		Martha Farnsworth Riche	October 1994 – January 1998
–		James Holmes	January 1998 – October 1998
20		Kenneth Prewitt	1998–2001
21		Charles Louis Kincannon	March 13, 2002 – January 3, 2008
22		Steve H. Murdock	January 4, 2008 – January 9, 2009
–		Thomas Mesenbourg	January 9, 2009 – July 15, 2009
23		Robert M. Groves	July 15, 2009 – August 11, 2012
–		Thomas Mesenbourg	August 11, 2012 – August 8, 2013
24		John H. Thompson	August 8, 2013 – June 30, 2017
–		Ron Jarmin	June 30, 2017 – January 7, 2019
25		Steven Dillingham	January 7, 2019 – January 20, 2021
–		Ron Jarmin	January 20, 2021 – January 5, 2022
26		Robert Santos	January 5, 2022 – January 31, 2025
–		Ron Jarmin	January 31, 2025 – September 19, 2025
–		George Cook	September 19, 2025 – Present
