= J. D. B. De Bow =

American publisher and statistician

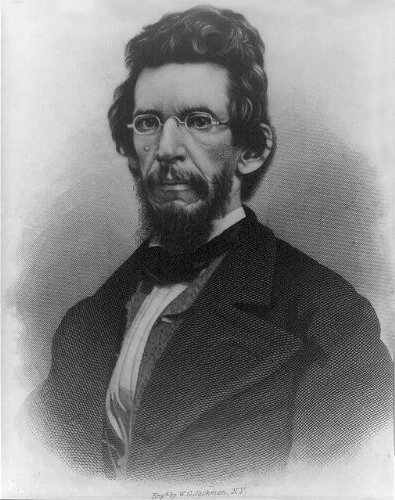
De Bow engraved by William G. Jackman

James Dunwoody Brownson De Bow (July 20, 1820 – February 27, 1867) was an American publisher and statistician, best known for his influential magazine De Bow's Review, who also served as superintendent of the U.S. Census from 1853 to 1855. He always spelled "De Bow" as two words.

== Biography ==
J. D. B. De Bow was born on July 20, 1820, in Charleston, South Carolina, the second son of Mary Bridget Norton and Garret De Bow. James' father, Garret, was born in New York City, New York about 1775 to a Dutch-Huguenot father who immigrated to the United States at an unknown date. His mother, Mary Bridget, was born into an elite planter family from South Carolina. Her grandfather was Capt. John Norton, an early settler on the Carolina Coast. Her father, William, was a soldier in the American Revolutionary War.

A resident of New Orleans, De Bow used his magazine to advocate the expansion of Southern agriculture and commerce so that the Southern economy could become independent of the North. He warned constantly of the South's "colonial" relationship with the North, one in which the South was at a distinct disadvantage.

In 1866, he became the first president of the proposed Tennessee and Pacific Railroad, a business venture that he would not live to see fulfilled. Less than a year later, De Bow died of peritonitis, which he contracted on a trip to visit his brother in New Jersey.

Preceded by Joseph Camp Griffith Kennedy	Superintending Clerk of the United States Census; 1853–1855	Succeeded by Joseph Camp Griffith Kennedy
