= Robert Santos =

American statistician (born 1957)

Rob Santos
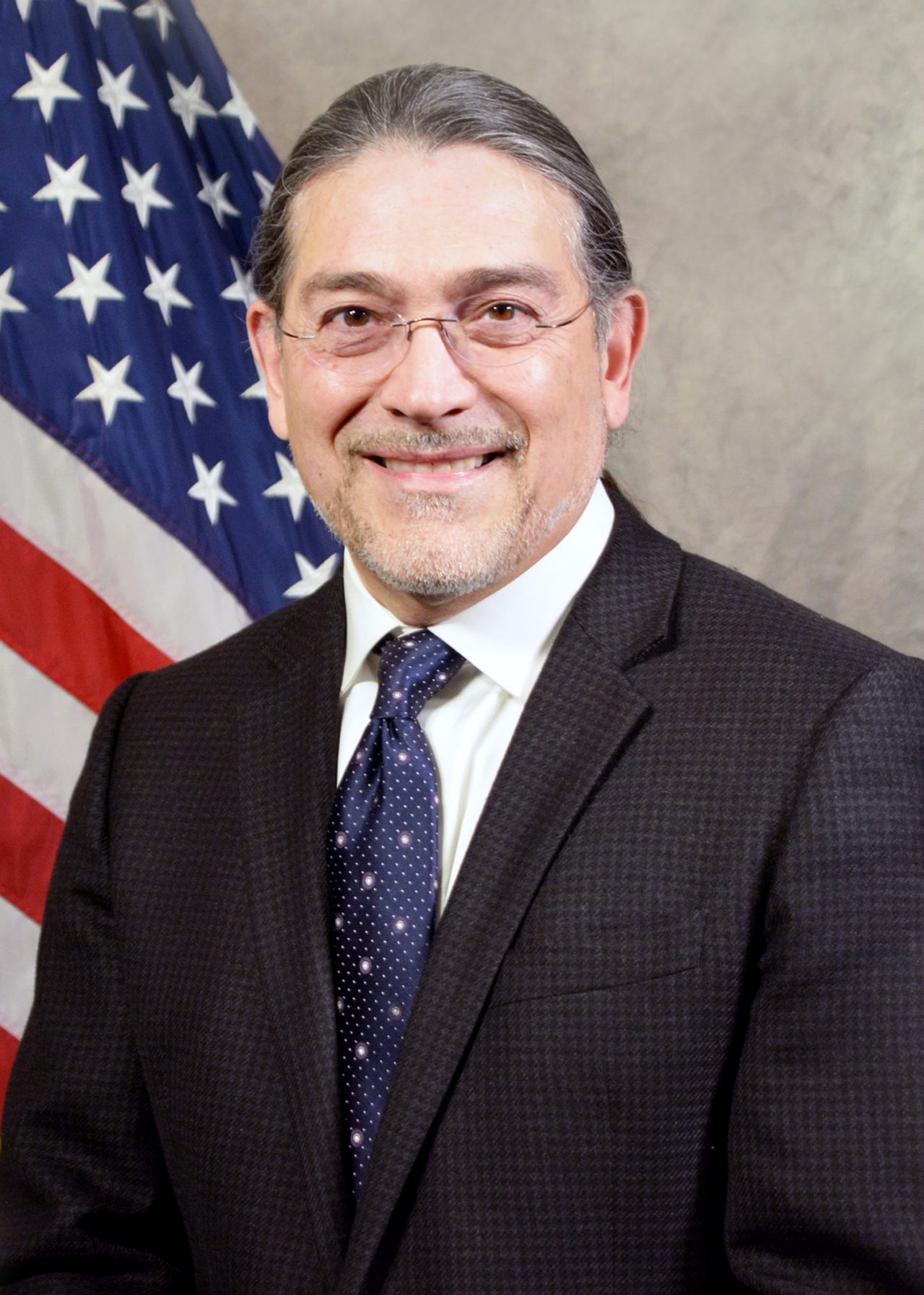

26th Director of the United States Census Bureau
- In office January 5, 2022 – January 31, 2025
- President: Joe Biden; Donald Trump
- Preceded by: Ron S. Jarmin (acting)
- Succeeded by: Ron S. Jarmin (acting)

Personal details
- Born: Robert Luis Santos; 1957 (age 68–69) San Antonio, Texas, U.S.
- Education: San Antonio College (attended); Trinity University (BA); University of Michigan (MA)

Robert Luis Santos (born 1957) is an American statistician who was the director of the United States Census Bureau from 2022 to 2025. He served as the 116th president of the American Statistical Association in 2021.

== Early life and education ==
Santos was born in San Antonio. After graduating from Holy Cross of San Antonio, he earned a Bachelor of Arts degree in mathematics from Trinity University and a Master of Arts in statistics from the University of Michigan.

== Career ==
Santos has worked at the University of Michigan's Survey Research Center, NORC at the University of Chicago, and the Institute for Survey Research at Temple University. He was the 116th president of the American Statistical Association, 2013-2014 president of the American Association of Public Opinion Research, and a member of the National Center for Health Statistics board of counselors. Santos was the vice president for statistical methods and chief methodologist at the Urban Institute in Washington, D.C.

Santos was confirmed as United States Census Bureau Director by the U.S. Senate on November 4, 2021, and was sworn in on January 5, 2022. Santos is of Mexican American heritage. He is the first Latino person to serve as permanent, Senate-approved director of the Census Bureau (James F. Holmes, a Black man, was acting director of the Census Bureau in January-October 1998).

In 2006 Santos was recipient of the American Statistical Association Founders Award.

In 2023 he was awarded an honorary doctorate by North Carolina State University.

== Personal life ==
Santos identifies as a Chicano. From 2012 to 2019, he was a SXSW Festival photographer and later helped manage the photo crew of about 100 photographers at this annual film and music event in Austin.
