= Susan Mullin Vogel =

- Born: Detroit, Michigan, U.S.
- Education: Georgetown University; New York University
- Occupations: Curator; filmmaker; academic
- Years active: since c. 1966
- Spouses: Jerome Vogel (m. 1964; div. 1987); Kenneth Prewitt (m. 1995)

Susan Mullin Vogel is a curator, professor, scholar, and filmmaker whose area of focus is African art. She was a curator at the Metropolitan Museum of Art, founded what is now The Africa Center in the early 1980s, served as Director of the Yale University Art Gallery, taught African art and architecture at Columbia University, and has made films.

== Early life ==
Susan Mullin was born in Detroit. She had a parent who worked in the overseas division of General Motors, so she grew up in Beirut, and also lived parts of her early life in Greenwich, Connecticut and Puerto Rico. She attended Georgetown University as an undergraduate. After graduating, she moved to Abidjan, Côte d'Ivoire after marrying Jerry Vogel, who was sent there on a Fulbright fellowship.

== Professional career ==
After her return to the United States in 1966, having "fallen in love with the place and with the art" in Côte d'Ivoire, Vogel worked at the Museum of Primitive Art, founded by Nelson A. Rockefeller, at the same time earning her Ph.D. in art history from New York University. She worked at the Museum of Primitive Art for eight years, during which time she wrote extensively and became an assistant curator. In 1975, after Rockefeller donated the holdings of the Museum of Primitive Art to the Metropolitan Museum of Art where it would be housed in the new Michael C. Rockefeller Wing, Vogel joined the Metropolitan Museum as an associate curator, where she managed the collection and its display through the 1982 opening of the Rockefeller Wing.

In 1984, in New York City, she founded the Center for African Art, later the Museum for African Art (and now the Africa Center). While running that museum for ten years, she curated a number of widely praised exhibitions and wrote, co-wrote or published accompanying books.

In 1994, she was named as Director of the Yale Art Gallery. Richard Levin, the President of Yale at the time, said "Susan Vogel is widely respected as an innovator and leader in the museum world. She is a proven institution builder: the museum she founded in New York began as a small center and has grown in just over a decade to a major museum."

Vogel won the 1998 Herskovits Prize for Baule: African Art, Western Eyes, which was later incorporated into a John Edmonds installation at the Brooklyn Museum. Among her other notable books and articles are African Aesthetics, and Buli Master and Other Hands. She has also written extensively about the life and art of El Anatsui, including El Anatsui: Art and Life in 2020.

In 2004, she was appointed Professor of African art and architecture at Columbia.

Vogel's papers and library related to her work as a curator and scholar of African art are held by the Getty Research Institute.

Following her career as an art museum leader, Vogel spent two years as a graduate film student at New York University, and became a documentary filmmaker.

== Personal life ==
Vogel has lived for long periods of time in Côte d'Ivoire and Mali. She was married to Jerome "Jerry" Vogel from 1964 to 1987. She was married to Columbia professor Kenneth Prewitt from 1995 until his death at age 90 in 2026.

== Works ==
=== Books ===
- African Sculpture: The Shape of Surprise (1980) (exhibition catalog)
- The Buli Master, and Other Hands (1980) (short)
- African Masterpieces from The Musee de l'Homme (1985) (with Francine N'Diaye)
- African Aesthetics: The Carlo Monzino Collection (1986) (co-author)
- Art/Artifact: African Art in Anthropology Collections (1988) (editor, introduction)
- Africa Explores: 20th Century African Art (1991)
- Exhibition-ism: Museums and African Art (1994) (co-author)
- Baule: African Art Western Eyes (1997)
- El Anatsui: Art and Life (2012, 2nd ed. 2020)

=== Films ===
- Living Memory: Six Sketches of Mali Today (2003)
- Fang: An Epic Journey (2003) (short)
- Malick Sidibe: Portrait of the Artist as a Portraitist (2006) (short)
- Future of Mud: A Tale of Houses and Lives in Djenne (2007)
- Anatsui at Work: Eight Shorts for Museums and Classrooms (2011)
- Fold Crumple Crush: The Art of El Anatsui (2011)

=== Selected articles ===
- "People of Wood: Baule Figure Sculpture," Art Journal, vol. 33, No. 1 (1973)
- "Art and Politics: A Staff from the Court of Benin, West Africa," Metropolitan Museum Journal, v. 13 (1978)
- "Bringing African Art to the Metropolitan Museum," African Arts, Vol. 15, No. 2 (Feb. 1982)
- "Africa and the Renaissance: Art in Ivory," African Arts, Vol. 22, No. 2 (1989)
- "Always True to the Object, in Our Fashion," Chapter 13 of Karp, Ivan; Lavine, Steven D., eds. (1991). Exhibiting Cultures: The Poetics and Politics of Museum Display. Smithsonian Institution Press. ISBN 9781560980216.
- "Baule: African Art Western Eyes," African Arts, Vol. 30, No. 4 (1997)
- "Whither African Art? Emerging Scholarship at the End of an Age," African Arts, Vol. 38, No. 4 (2005)
