= Manuel D. Plotkin =

American market researcher (1923-2011)

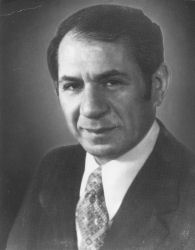

15th Director of the United States Census Bureau
- In office 1977–1979
- President: Jimmy Carter
- Preceded by: Vincent Barabba
- Succeeded by: Bruce K. Chapman

Personal details
- Born: May 16, 1923 Chita, Russia
- Died: January 10, 2011 (aged 87)
- Education: Northwestern University (BS); University of Chicago (MBA)

Manuel D. Plotkin (May 16, 1923 – January 10, 2011) was an American market researcher, economist, and former head of the United States Census Bureau. He previously served as the president of the American Marketing Association.

== Biography ==
Plotkin was born in Chita, Russia in 1923. He immigrated at age 3 with his family to the U.S., eventually settling in Chicago. He graduated from Northwestern University in 1948 and received an M.B.A. from the University of Chicago in 1949.

From 1949 to 1953, he was a price economist and survey coordinator for the Bureau of Labor Statistics in Washington, D.C. and in Chicago. From 1953 to 1977 and 1979 to 1980, he held positions with Sears, Roebuck and Co., including senior economist, manager of market research, director of corporate planning and research, and executive corporate planner.

He served as the 15th director of the U.S. Census Bureau from 1977 to 1979 as part of the Carter administration.

He was married and had one child.

He died in 2011.

== Affiliations ==
Plotkin was a member of the American Marketing Association, serving as president from 1969 to 1970. He was also a member of the American Statistical Association, a member of the Marketing Research Advisory Council of the Conference Board, chairman of the Council from 1977 to 1978, and a trustee of the Marketing Science Institute. He served as the president of the Chicago chapter of the American Statistical Association from 1966 to 1967.

== Bibliography ==
- Ferber, Robert; HawkesJr., William J.; Plotkin, Manuel D. (1 October 1976). "How Reliable Are National Retail Sales Estimates?: A wealth of information for marketing purposes …". Journal of Marketing. 40 (4): 13–22. doi:10.1177/002224297604000402.
