= A. Ross Eckler =

American mathematician

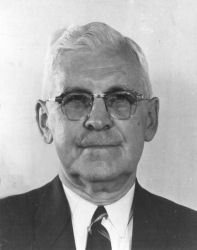

12th Director of the United States Census Bureau
- In office 1965 - 1969
- President: Lyndon B. Johnson
- Preceded by: Richard M. Scammon
- Succeeded by: George Hay Brown

Personal details
- Born: Albert Ross Eckler; May 22, 1901 Van Hornesville, New York, US
- Died: March 14, 1991 (aged 89) Maryland, US
- Known for: Deputy Director (1949–1965) and Director (1965–1969) of the United States Census Bureau, President of the American Statistical Association

Albert Ross Eckler (May 22, 1901 – March 14, 1991) served as Deputy Director of the United States Census Bureau from 1949 to 1965, and its Director from 1965 until 1969. He was the first career employee ever to become director of the agency.

== Career ==
Eckler was born in Van Hornesville, New York in 1901 and lived on a farm until he attended Hamilton College. He then earned a master's degree and a PhD at Harvard University in 1934. Eckler joined the Census Bureau in 1939 as chief of economic statistics in the Population Division. He then became assistant chief of the Population Division and then the Special Surveys Division and chief social scientist. In 1949, he became Deputy Director and in 1965 President Lyndon B. Johnson appointed him director. He worked as director until 1969 and later died in Maryland in 1991.

He authored The Bureau of the Census (ISBN 0-275-55370-1), and was president of the American Statistical Association. He is also the father of logologist and centenarian researcher A. Ross Eckler, Jr.

Government offices
Preceded by Richard M. Scammon	Director of the United States Census Bureau; 1965 – 1969	Succeeded by George Hay Brown
