= Patricia S. Hu =

Patricia Hu
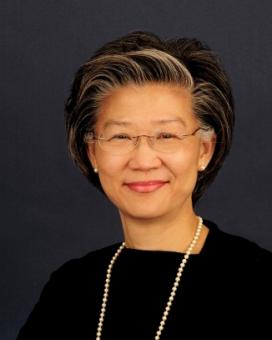

4th Director of the Bureau of Transportation Statistics
- In office 2011–2025
- Preceded by: Steven Dillingham
- Succeeded by: Rolf Schmitt (acting)

Personal details
- Education: National Chengchi University; University of Guelph (MA)

Patricia S. Hu is a Taiwanese-American public servant who was the fourth director of the Bureau of Transportation Statistics at the United States Department of Transportation from 2011 to 2025, the first woman to hold that position. She was previously the director of the Center for Transportation Analysis at Oak Ridge National Laboratory.

== Career ==
Hu received statistics degrees from the National Chengchi University and the University of Guelph. She was chairman of the Transportation Research Board.

She worked as a biostatistician for Brookhaven National Laboratory, and then joined Oak Ridge National Laboratory (ORNL) in 1982. She was director of ORNL's Center for Transportation Analysis for nine years, and co-authored many of its annual Summary of Travel Trends: Nationwide Personal Travel Survey bulletins, detailing household vehicle travel patterns and usage. In addition, she co-authored various journal articles investigating the relationship between aging and car crashes, and the different risk factors found among older male and female drivers.

Hu started at the Bureau of Transportation Statistics as Director in 2011. It is a civil service position. "Hu has led many applied research projects, published extensively, and received the TRB Pyke Johnson Award in 1984." She has also received the YMCA's Tribute to Women Award, and the Association for Women in Science Award.

As the Director of the BTS, Hu worked to increase the efficiency of the agency by better leveraging the sharing of big data, such as data from the Waze app to mine highway safety information in order to best position emergency vehicles to respond to accidents quickly and efficiently.
