= George Hay Brown =

Former Census Bureau director (1910 – 1999)

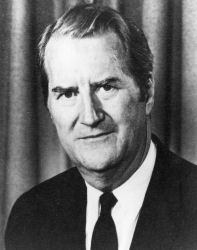

13th Director of the United States Census Bureau
- President: Richard Nixon
- Preceded by: A. Ross Eckler
- Succeeded by: Vincent Barabba

Personal details
- Born: February 4, 1910 Denver, Colorado
- Died: April 5, 1999 (aged 89) Sea Island, Georgia
- Education: Oberlin College (BA); Harvard University (MBA); University of Chicago (PhD)

George Hay Brown (February 4, 1910 – April 5, 1999) was the former director of the United States Census Bureau from 1969 to 1973.

Brown earned a bachelor's degree from Oberlin College in 1929, an M.B.A. from Harvard University, and a PhD in economics from the University of Chicago in 1945. His thesis, supervised by Jacob Viner, was on the international economic position of New Zealand.

He worked at Ford Motor Company until appointed director of the Bureau of the Census in 1969.

He was elected a Fellow of the American Statistical Association in 1970.

Brown's papers are held by the American Heritage Center at the University of Wyoming.

He died in 1999 at Sea Island, Georgia.
