= John G. Keane =

American business executive, government official, and academic

Jack Keane
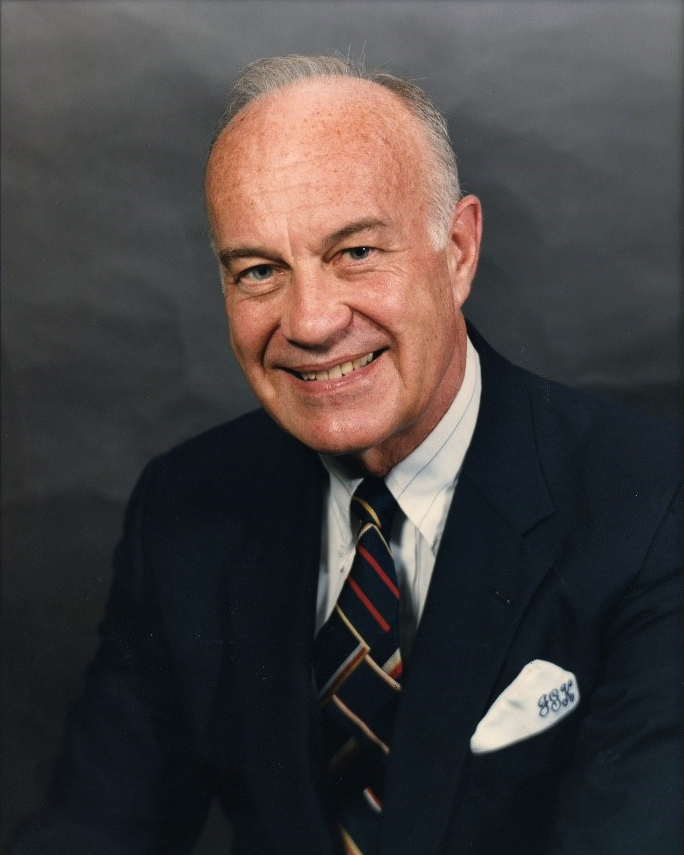

17th Director of the U.S. Census Bureau
- In office March 20, 1984 – January 20, 1989
- President: Ronald Reagan
- Preceded by: Bruce Chapman
- Succeeded by: Barbara Everitt Bryant

Personal details
- Born: John Gorman Keane; July 3, 1930 Fort Wayne, Indiana, U.S.
- Died: October 24, 2019 (aged 89) Notre Dame, Indiana, U.S.
- Spouse: Rosemarie Halloran (m. 1959)
- Education: Syracuse University (AB); University of Notre Dame (BS); Indiana University, Bloomington (MBA); University of Pittsburgh (PhD)

Military service
- Allegiance: United States
- Branch/service: United States Air Force
- Years of service: 1951–1955
- Battles/wars: Korean War

John Gorman "Jack" Keane (July 3, 1930 – October 24, 2019) was an American business executive, government official, and academic, who served as the 18th Director of the United States Census Bureau from 1984 to 1989.

== Early life and education ==
Keane was born to William G. and Esther (Centlivre) Keane, in Fort Wayne, Indiana. Except for military and government service, he lived almost all of his life in the Midwest. He earned degrees from Syracuse University (A.B.), University of Notre Dame (B.S.), Indiana University (M.B.A.), and the University of Pittsburgh (Ph.D.). During the Korean War, Keene served in military intelligence in the U.S. Air Force.

== Career ==
Beginning his career at U.S. Steel, Keene worked for J. Walter Thompson and Booz Allen Hamilton. He later founded Managing Change, Inc., a consulting firm.

Keane was appointed by President Ronald Reagan to serve as the 18th Director of the United States Census Bureau. He served from 1984 to 1989, during which time he testified before Congress 43 times and oversaw the Census Bureau's significant collaboration with the World Bank, International Monetary Fund, and the U.S. Agency for International Development.

After leaving government service, Keane served as Gillen Dean and Korth Professor of Strategic Management in the Notre Dame College of Business Administration from 1989 to 1997 and as Korth Professor of Strategic Management until 2010.

== Personal life ==
Keene married Rosemarie Halloran on June 20, 1959, in Pittsburgh, Pennsylvania. They had two daughters and one son. Keene was a member of the Knights of Malta and served one term as president of the American Marketing Association. He loved to play sports including basketball and softball.
