= Steve H. Murdock =

American sociologist (1948–2023)

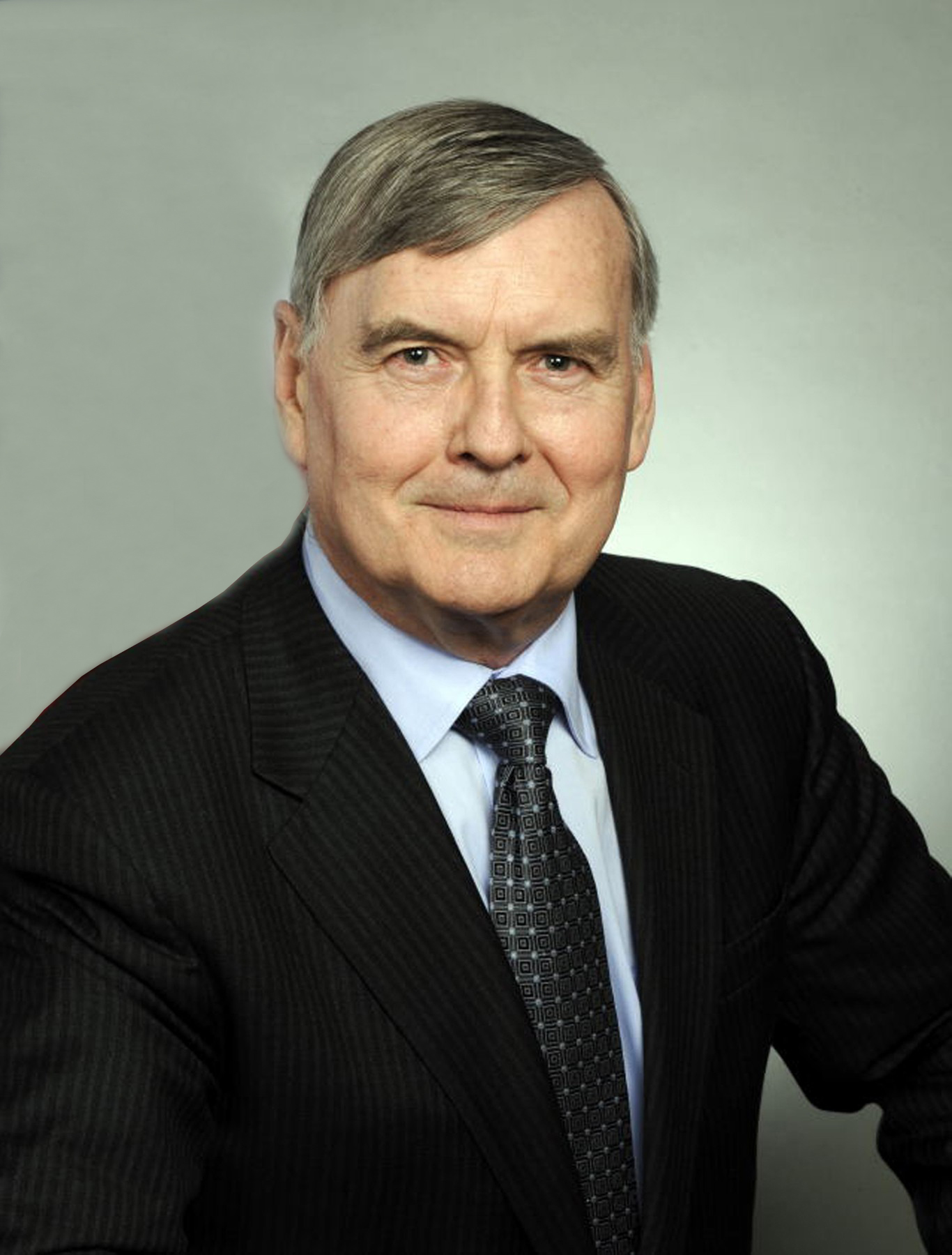

22nd Director of the United States Census Bureau
- In office January 4, 2008 – January 9, 2009
- President: George W. Bush
- Preceded by: Charles Louis Kincannon
- Succeeded by: Robert M. Groves

Personal details
- Born: June 2, 1948 Fergus Falls, Minnesota, U.S.
- Died: April 7, 2023 (aged 74)
- Education: University of Kentucky (Ph.D.) North Dakota State University (B.A.)

Steve H. Murdock (June 2, 1948 – April 7, 2023) was an American sociologist and the former director of the United States Census Bureau. He held named professorships in sociology at Texas A&M University, the University of Texas at San Antonio and Rice University. Murdock served as the first official Texas State Demographer.

== Biography ==
Murdock was a graduate of North Dakota State University and he received a Ph.D. in sociology from the University of Kentucky. He was a Regents Professor and Head of the Department of Rural Sociology at Texas A&M University. In 2001, Murdock became the first official demographer of the state of Texas. He was later the Lutcher Brown Distinguished Chair in Demography and Organization Studies at the University of Texas at San Antonio and the Director of the Institute for Demographic and Socioeconomic Research.

Murdock was nominated to serve as director of the United States Census Bureau in the summer of 2007 by George W. Bush and he held the position from January 2008 until the change in presidential administrations in January 2009. He was the Allyn R. and Gladys M. Cline Professor of Sociology at Rice University until retiring in 2019.

Murdock died on April 7, 2023, at the age of 74.

Political offices
Preceded by Charles Louis Kincannon	Director of the Census Bureau; 2008–2009	Succeeded by Robert M. Groves
