= Roy Peel =

American political scientist, academic, and government administrator

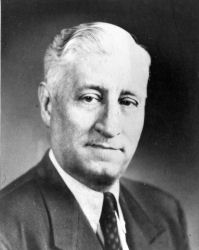
- Roy Peel

9th Director of the United States Census Bureau
- In office 1950 - 1953
- President: Harry S. Truman
- Preceded by: James Clyde Capt
- Succeeded by: Robert Wilbur Burgess

Personal details
- Born: July 26, 1896 Des Moines, Iowa
- Died: August 31, 1978 (aged 82) Los Angeles, California
- Education: Augustana College; University of Chicago
- Known for: Director of the U.S Census from 1950–53

Roy Victor Peel (July 26, 1896 – 31 August 1978) was a political scientist and academic, and the director of the United States Census Bureau from 1950 to 1953.

== Early life and education ==
Born in Des Moines, Iowa in 1896, Peel's service in World War I interrupted his college education; he was a second lieutenant in the Army Air Service. After the war, he completed his B.A., graduating from Augustana College in 1920. From there, Peel moved between teaching and post-graduate education, eventually earning a Ph.D. from the University of Chicago in 1927.

== Career ==
While an assistant professor of government at New York University, Peel researched and wrote extensively, publishing several articles and books. By 1934, he was the director of research in public administration at NYU and had achieved the rank of full professor. That same year he managed the successful mayoral campaign of Fiorello LaGuardia. In 1935, Peel began a nearly two-year research expedition to Scandinavia, planning to survey public administration in those countries. Returning to the United States in late 1936, he took a position at Indiana University.

During World War II, Peel worked for the government in a confidential civilian capacity. This tour of service included a stint as chief of the United States Information Service in Copenhagen in 1945. In 1948 he authored a book, State Government Today, published by the University of New Mexico Press. President Truman appointed him director of the Census Bureau in February 1950, only months before the decennial census. Peel stayed on at the Census Bureau until 1953, when he returned to the academic world. He was appointed the chair of the political science department at the University of Utah in 1953, and in 1961 he was hired at California Lutheran College. He then took a faculty position at San Fernando Valley State College (now California State University, Northridge) in 1963 and taught there until his retirement in 1976.

== Personal life ==
Peel was married for many years to Esther (Peggy) Peel and had two children and five grandchildren.

== Death ==
Peel died of cancer after a long illness on August 31, 1978.

== Honors, grants, and awards ==
- Social Science Research Council Grant (1930-1931)
- Rockefeller Foundation Spelman Fund Grant (1934-1936)
- Honorary Doctor of Laws (L.L.D.), Augustana College (1950)
- Gold Medal for Exceptional Service, U.S. Commerce Department (1952)
- Remington-Rand Grant (1953-1954)
- Local Government Survey Commission, State of Utah Grant (1955-1956)
- IBM Grant (1971-1972)
- Guest of Honor, West German Government (1964)

== Publications ==
- The 1928 Campaign: An Analysis (1931) (co-authored with Thomas C. Donnelly)
- The 1932 Campaign: An Analysis (1935) (co-authored with Thomas C. Donnelly)
- The Political Clubs of New York City (1935, republished in 1968)
- Better City Government (1938)
- Introduction to Politics (1944) (co-editor with Joseph S. Roucek)
- State Government Today (1948)
- The Ombudsman or Citizen's Defender: A Modern Institution (1968)
