= C. Louis Kincannon =

American statistician (1940–2012)

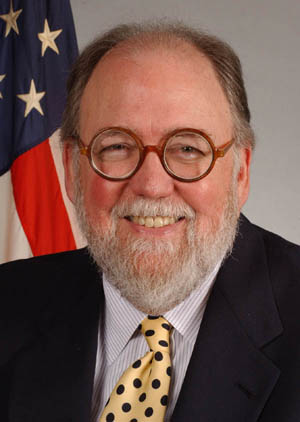

21st Director of the U.S. Census Bureau
- In office March 13, 2002 – January 3, 2008
- President: George W. Bush
- Preceded by: Kenneth Prewitt
- Succeeded by: Steve H. Murdock

Personal details
- Born: December 9, 1940 Waco, Texas, U.S.
- Died: December 15, 2012 (aged 72) Washington, D.C., U.S.
- Education: University of Texas

Charles Louis Kincannon (December 9, 1940 – December 15, 2012) was an American statistician who served as the Director of the United States Census Bureau from 2002 to 2008. Kincannon had joined the Census Bureau in 1963. Kincannon took the Director's office on March 13, 2002, after being nominated by President George W. Bush and confirmed unanimously by the United States Senate. He served for six years until his retirement on January 3, 2008.

Kincannon was born in Waco, Texas, on December 12, 1940. He earned a bachelor's degree from the University of Texas in 1963.

He joined the United States Census Bureau in 1963 as a statistician. Kincannon worked at the Census Bureau for the majority of his federal career. His two exceptions were stints in the 1970s, when he joined the staff of the Office of Management and Budget, and a tenure as the chief statistician of the Organisation for Economic Co-operation and Development, based in Paris during the 1990s.

Kincannon became the Director of the United States Census Bureau in 2002. He is credited with expanding the linguistic diversity of the Bureau's staff during his six-year tenure. Kincannon purposely hired new census enumerators (or census takers) for the then-forthcoming 2010 U.S. census from diverse ethnic and linguistic backgrounds. He argued that employees who were familiar with different languages and ethnicities would produce a more accurate census count.

Kincannon expressed pride of serving as Director of the Census Bureau, noting that past directors included Thomas Jefferson, John Quincy Adams and Martin Van Buren, who had overseen the census as United States Secretary of State.

Kincannon died from cancer at Washington Hospital Center in Washington, D.C., on December 15, 2012, at the age of 72. Survivors included his wife of forty-four years, Lois Claire Green Kincannon, and his two daughters, Alexandra Kincannon and Indya Kincannon, then a Knox County, Tennessee, school board member, and current mayor of Knoxville, Tennessee.
