= John H. Thompson (statistician) =

American statistician (1951–2025)

John H. Thompson FASA
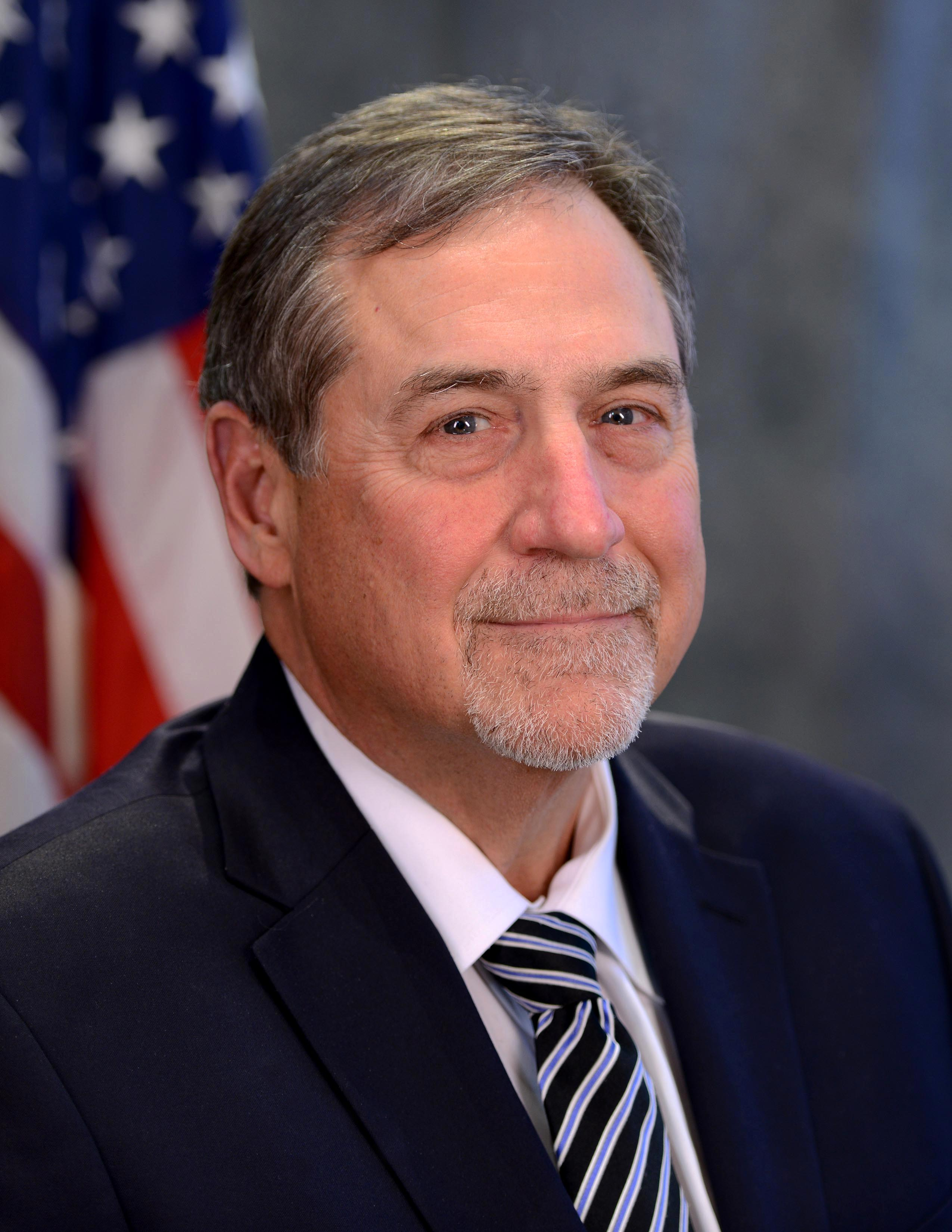
- Official portrait, 2014

24th Director of the United States Census Bureau
- In office August 8, 2013 – June 30, 2017
- President: Barack Obama; Donald Trump
- Deputy: Nancy Potok
- Preceded by: Robert Groves
- Succeeded by: Steven Dillingham

Personal details
- Born: John Hubert Thompson; June 19, 1951 Washington, D.C., U.S.
- Died: May 9, 2025 (aged 73) Bend, Oregon, U.S.
- Spouse: Bonnie Jean Thompson
- Education: Virginia Tech (BS, MS)
- Occupation: Statistician

John Hubert Thompson (June 19, 1951 – May 9, 2025) was an American statistician and Director of the United States Census Bureau. In this position, one of his main duties was to oversee preparations for the 2020 United States census. On May 9, 2017, the Commerce Department announced that he would leave his post on June 30.

== Life and career ==
Thompson was born in Washington, D.C. on June 19, 1951. He received B.S. and M.S. degrees in mathematics from Virginia Polytechnic Institute and State University in 1973 and 1975, respectively. After graduation, he spent 27 years working at the United States Census Bureau, retiring in 2002 after holding the position of associate director, where he was responsible for the 2000 Census. Prior to that, Thompson served as Chief of the Decennial Management Division. He worked in the Statistical Support Division from 1987 to 1995 and the Statistical Methods Division from 1975 to 1987.

From 2008 to 2013, Thompson was the President and CEO of NORC at the University of Chicago. Thompson joined NORC in 2002 as the executive vice president for survey operations and was appointed president and CEO in 2008.

He was confirmed by the United States Senate to be the 24th Census Bureau director on August 1, 2013.

Thompson died in Bend, Oregon on May 9, 2025, at the age of 73.
