= Kenneth Prewitt =

American academic (1936–2026)

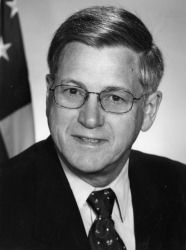

20th Director of the U.S. Census Bureau
- In office 1998–2001
- President: Bill Clinton
- Preceded by: Martha Farnsworth Riche
- Succeeded by: C. Louis Kincannon

Personal details
- Born: Carl Kenneth Prewitt Jr. March 16, 1936 Alton, Illinois, U.S.
- Died: June 5, 2026 (aged 90)
- Spouse: Susan Mullin Vogel (m. 1995)
- Education: Southern Methodist University; Washington University in St. Louis; Stanford University (PhD)

Kenneth Prewitt (March 16, 1936 – June 5, 2026) was an American academic. He was the Carnegie Professor of Social Affairs at Columbia University's School of International and Public Affairs, where he was also director of the Scholarly Knowledge Project. He was Director of the United States Census Bureau from 1998 to 2001.

== Biography ==
Prewitt was born March 16, 1936, in Alton, Illinois. He graduated from Alton High School in 1954 and then attended DePauw University for one year before transferring to Southern Methodist University. Prewitt received a B.A. in 1958 from Southern Methodist; a M.A. in 1959 from Washington University in St. Louis, and a 1963 Ph.D. in political science from Stanford University with a thesis "Career patterns and role-orientations: an inquiry into the political behavior of city councilmen" and was a Danforth Fellow at the Harvard Divinity School from 1959 to 1960.

He was appointed Assistant Professor at the University of Chicago in 1965, rising to the rank of first Associate and then Full Professor. From 1998 to 2000 he was the Director of the Census Bureau from 1998 to 2001 and Director of the National Opinion Research Center. He has also served as president of the Social Science Research Council, as senior vice president of the Rockefeller Foundation, and as Dean of the Graduate School at the New School University. Since 2015, he has been the president of the American Academy of Political and Social Science.

Prewitt has two children by his first marriage, and was married to Susan Mullin Vogel, an art historian, museum curator and leader, and filmmaker. Prewitt died in 2026 at the age of 90.

== Honors ==
He is a fellow of the American Academy of Arts and Sciences, the American Academy of Political and Social Science, the American Association for the Advancement of Science, the Center for Advanced Study in the Behavioral Sciences, and the Russell Sage Foundation. He has received a Guggenheim fellowship and a Lifetime Career Award from the American Political Science Association,. He also has received honorary degrees from Southern Methodist University and from Carnegie Mellon University.

== Publications ==
=== Books ===
- Kenneth Prewitt. What is Your Race? The Flawed Effort of the Census to Classify Americans Princeton University Press, 2013. ISBN 9780691157030 According to WorldCat, the book is held in 207 libraries
- Kenneth Prewitt; Thomas A Schwandt; Miron L Straf, eds.. Using Science as Evidence in Public Policy National Research Council of the National Academies, 2012 ISBN 9780309261616. free download
- Kenneth Prewitt, ed. The federal statistical system : its vulnerability matters more than you think (Annals of the American Academy of Political and Social Science, 631) Sage Foundation, 2010/ ISBN 9781412992589
- Kenneth Prewitt. The Hard Count: The Political and Social Challenges of Census Mobilization Russell Sage Foundation, 2010
- Kenneth Prewitt., ed. The Legitimacy of Philanthropic Foundations: United States and European Perspectives. New York: R. Sage Foundation, 2006
- Prewitt, Kenneth. The Recruitment of Political Leaders: A Study of Citizen-Politicians. Westport Conn: Greenwood Press, 1981 ISBN 9780313227448
- Prewitt, Kenneth, and Sidney Verba. An Introduction to American Government. New York: Harper & Row, 1974. 9780060452841; 2nd ed, 1977; 3rd ed. 1979; 4th ed. 1983 (this and subsequent eds. with Robert Holt Salisbury); 5th ed. 1987; 6th ed. 1991.
  - Abridged version publ.as Principles of American Government 1975.
- Prewitt, Kenneth, and Alan Stone. The Ruling Elites: Elite Theory, Power, and American Democracy. New York: Harper & Row, 1973. According to WorldCat, the book is held in 631 libraries
- Prewitt, Kenneth. Education and Political Values: An East African Case Study. Nairobi: East African Pub. House, 1971 OCLC 643528

=== Other publications ===
He has also published 100 articles and book chapters.
