= Tennessee and Pacific Railroad =

19th-century railroad company

The Tennessee and Pacific Railroad was a 19th-century American company that operated a rail line from Lebanon, Tennessee, to Nashville, Tennessee.

The state of Tennessee chartered the railroad on May 24, 1866. The original plans were to build a line from Knoxville westward through Lebanon, Nashville, and Memphis to Jackson, Mississippi, where it would interconnect with westward-leading railroads to the Pacific Coast. Hauling coal from the nearby Cumberland Mountains to western markets was an important intended source of operation income, as well as from passenger service and produce and freight hauls.

Among the early investors and executives was former Confederate general George Maney, who would serve for nine years as the president of the Tennessee & Pacific, starting in 1868 when he succeeded the late James D. B. DeBow, the well known publisher of DeBow's Review.

Plagued by difficulties in raising enough financing, the company finally began construction in June 1869 of the 29-mile line between Lebanon and Nashville. Funds were generated to commission the Rogers Locomotive and Machine Works to manufacture two 4-4-0 locomotives for the new T&P, which were delivered in 1870. These were named the "Wilson County" and the "J.D.B. DeBow".

The segment opened in September 1871 in time to convey passengers to the Wilson County Fair. Headquartered in Lebanon, the fledgling railroad erected a sprawling Victorian-style passenger and freight station, combined with the general offices. Major cargo from local farmers included lumber, butter, flour, and other agricultural products which were shipped to markets in Nashville, where another station house was erected in 1872.

However, the financial problems resurfaced and management could not repay the railroad company's debts. In 1877, the state revoked the charter and seized the Tennessee & Pacific. The company and its assets were sold on March 1 to the Nashville, Chattanooga and St. Louis Railway. The T&P stayed in operation under its old name until 1888, when it became the NC&StL Lebanon Branch. Passenger service continued on the old line until 1935, when the last train departed Lebanon.
