= Joseph C. G. Kennedy =

American statistician

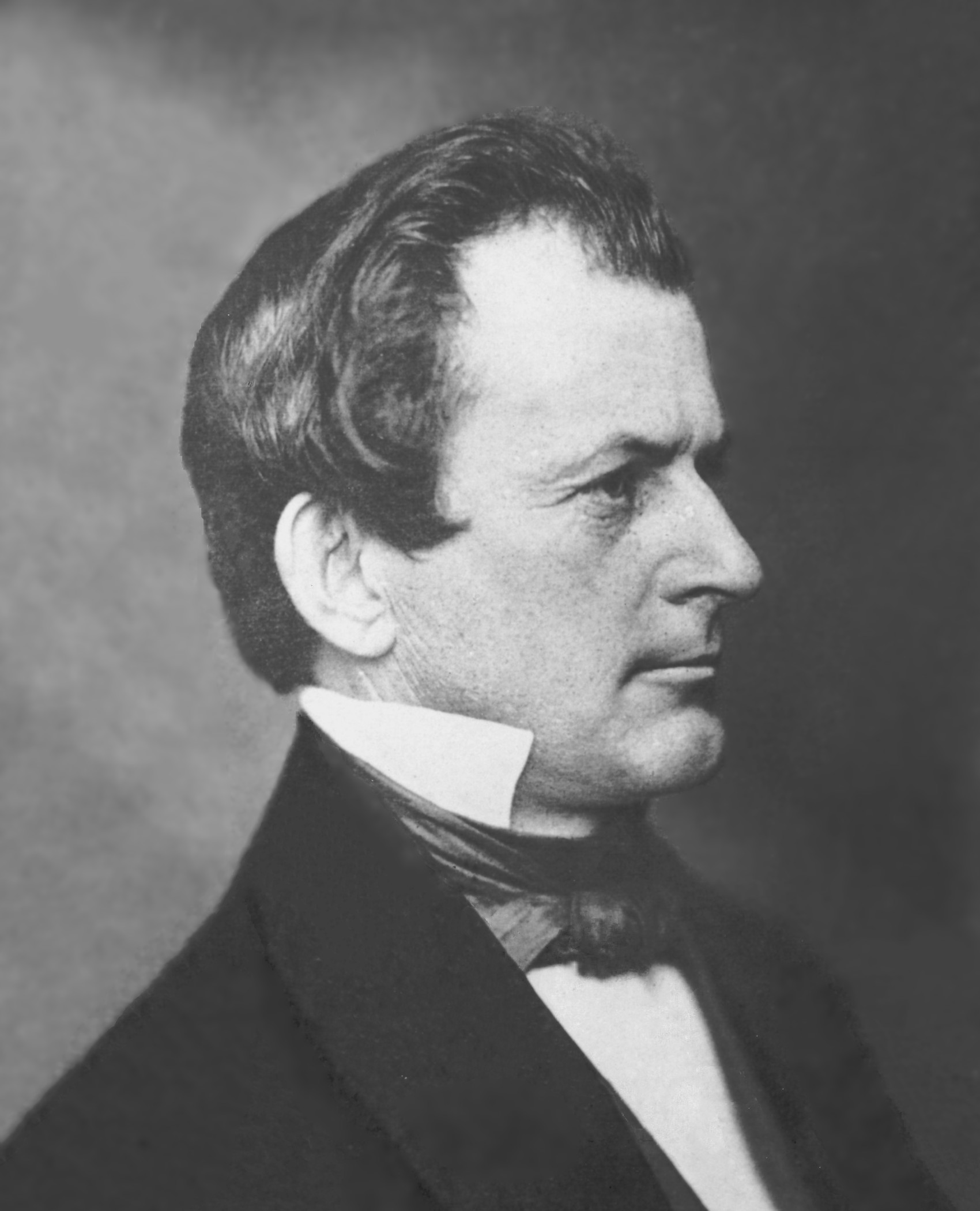
- Portrait of Kennedy, c. 1855

Superintending Clerk of the United States Census
- In office June 1, 1860 – June 7, 1865
- President: James Buchanan; Abraham Lincoln; Andrew Johnson
- Preceded by: J. D. B. De Bow
- Succeeded by: James M. Edmunds (acting)
- In office May 24, 1850 – March 18, 1853
- President: Zachary Taylor; Millard Fillmore; Franklin Pierce
- Preceded by: William A. Weaver
- Succeeded by: J. D. B. De Bow

Personal details
- Born: Joseph Calm Griffith Kennedy; April 1, 1813 Meadville, Pennsylvania, U.S.
- Died: July 13, 1887 (aged 74) Washington, D.C., U.S.
- Party: Whig
- Children: 4, including Annie K. Bidwell
- Education: Allegheny College
- Occupation: Lawyer; journalist; politician

Joseph Calm Griffith Kennedy (April 1, 1813 – July 13, 1887) of Pennsylvania, was a 19th-century Whig politician, lawyer and journalist who was appointed to supervise the United States Censuses for 1850 and 1860. A prosperous farmer and journalist from a prominent Pennsylvania family, Kennedy was appointed to supervise the census operations because of his political activism in the 1848 Pennsylvania election.

== Biography ==
Kennedy graduated from Allegheny College in Meadville, Pennsylvania. He received an M.A. in 1856, followed by an LL.D. in 1864. Upon the appointment to supervise the Census, Kennedy and his family moved to Washington, DC in 1849. His family included his wife, Catherine Morrison Kennedy, and children Joseph Morrison, John Reynolds, Sarah Jane and Annie Ellicott Kennedy. They lived there until at least 1868.

On July 13, 1887, Kennedy was stabbed and killed in Washington, D.C. by John Dailey. The latter was said to believe that Kennedy had cheated him in a business affair.

A small group of Kennedy's papers are held in the Walter Willcox Collection, Library of Congress.

== Census ==
The US Congress passed a census bill on March 3, 1849, which established a Census Board with an initial appropriation of $10,000 (~$297,346 in 2024). In May 1849, President Zachary Taylor appointed Kennedy to serve as the first Secretary of the new Census Board.

Under the direction of the Secretary of the Interior and with contentious Congressional oversight, Kennedy was responsible for redesigning the census methodology and forms, negotiating with Congressional leaders and committees, and gathering of census data throughout the United States. He was also responsible for supervising the ultimate compilation of census data, tabulation of statistics, and publication of census summaries.

The Seventh Census of the United States (1850) was taken June 1, 1850. This was the first year in which the census bureau attempted to count and name every member of every household, including women and children. Slaves were counted by gender and age on associated Slave Schedules, listed by their owner's name. The first slave schedules were produced in 1850. Prior to 1850, census records had recorded only the name of the head of the household and broad statistical accounting of other household members, (three children under age five, one woman between the age of 35 and 40, etc.)..

The Eighth Census of the United States (1860) estimated the population of the United States at 31,400,000. This was the first census in which American Indians were officially counted, but only those who had 'renounced tribal rules'. That figure for the nation was 40,000. Results of this census were tabulated by 184 clerks in the Bureau of the Census.

However, by the time the 1860 census returns were ready for tabulation, the United States was moving toward the American Civil War. As a result, Superintendent Kennedy and his staff produced only an abbreviated set of reports, which included no graphic or cartographic representations. As the war began, however, Kennedy and the Census staff used the new statistics to produce maps of Southern states for Union field commanders. These maps displayed militarily vital topics, including white population, slave population, predominant agricultural products (by county), and rail and post-road transportation routes. Congress appropriated funds for the continued operation of the census bureau through 1865. By June of that year, the results of the census had still not been reported to Congress, leading Secretary of the Interior James Harlan to remove Kennedy and appoint James M. Edmunds, Commissioner of the General Land Office, as acting superintendent "for the more efficient management of the service."

== Publications ==
- Agriculture of the United States in 1860; Compiled from the Original Returns of the Eighth Census, Under the Direction of the Secretary of the Interior. Washington D. C., Government Printing Office, 1864.
- Population of the United States in 1860; compiled from the original returns of the eighth census, under the direction of the Secretary of the Interior. Washington D.C., Government printing office, 1864. complete text online,

== See also ==
- Annie Kennedy Bidwell

Legal offices
| Preceded by William A. Weaver | Superintending Clerk of the United States Census; 1850–1853 | Succeeded by J. D. B. DeBow |
| Preceded by J. D. B. DeBow | Superintending Clerk of the United States Census; 1860–1865 | Succeeded by James M. Edmunds (acting) |
