= Steven Dillingham =

American government official (born 1952)

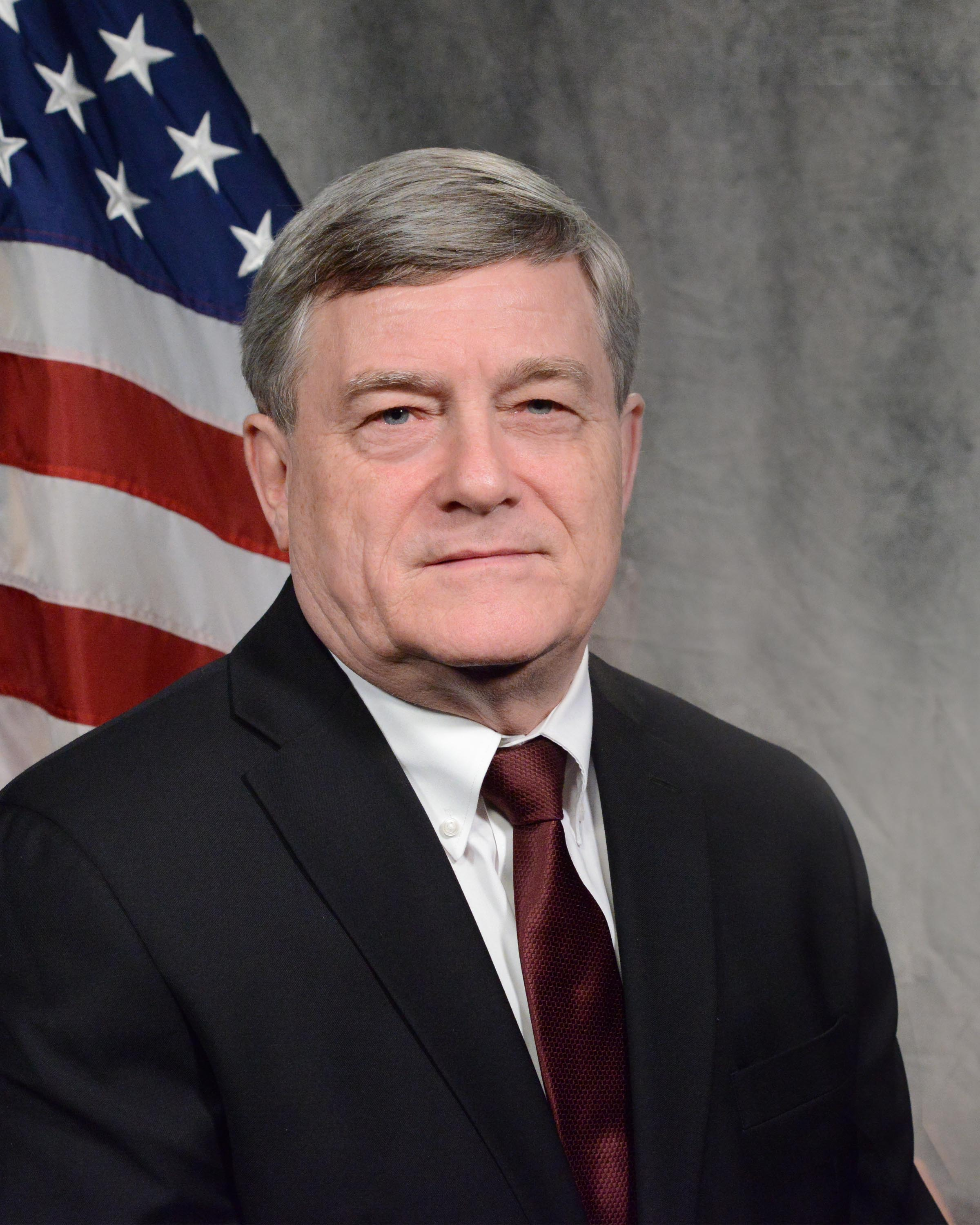

25th Director of the United States Census Bureau
- In office January 7, 2019 – January 20, 2021
- President: Donald Trump
- Deputy: Ron S. Jarmin
- Preceded by: Ron S. Jarmin (Acting)
- Succeeded by: Ron S. Jarmin (Acting)

3rd Director of the Bureau of Transportation Statistics
- In office 2007–2011
- Preceding: Richard Kowalewski (acting)
- Succeeded by: Patricia S. Hu

Personal details
- Born: May 12, 1952 (age 73) Orangeburg, South Carolina, U.S.
- Education: Winthrop University (BA); University of South Carolina (JD, MPA, PhD); George Washington University (MBA); Georgetown University (LLM)

Steven Dillingham (born May 12, 1952) is an American lawyer who served as the 25th director of the United States Census Bureau from January 7, 2019, to January 20, 2021.

== Education ==
Dillingham graduated from Rock Hill High School in Rock Hill, South Carolina, in 1970. From 1970 to 1972 he attended the US Air Force Academy. Dillingham graduated from Winthrop University in 1973 with a bachelor's degree in political science. He received his J.D., M.P.A., and Ph.D. from the University of South Carolina, and completed his M.B.A. at the George Washington University School of Business and LL.M. at Georgetown Law.

== Career ==
Dillingham is a career member of the U.S. federal government's Senior Executive Service, with more than 25 years of statistical, research, senior management, and legal experience. Dillingham's prior experience heading federal statistical service agencies includes a stint as Director of the Bureau of Justice Statistics and the Bureau of Transportation Statistics. Dillingham also served as Director of the Peace Corps Office of Strategic Information, Research, and Planning. Other federal service includes directing research and planning for the Department of Justice's United States Trustee Program, and directing surveys for the Office of Personnel Management.

In addition, Dillingham was the deputy director for the National District Attorneys Association and administrator of the American Prosecutors Research Institute. Dillingham has served on the faculties of the University of South Carolina and George Mason University. He is a senior certified professional with the Society for Human Resource Management.

=== U.S. Census ===
Dillingham was sworn in as the 25th director of the United States Census Bureau on January 7, 2019. He was nominated by President Donald Trump in 2018 and was confirmed by the United States Senate in a unanimous vote on January 2, 2019. On January 18, 2021, Dillingham announced his retirement effective January 20, 2021; his appointment was set to last until the end of 2021. His departure from the office was marked by accusations that he supported a partisan effort to try to use potentially inaccurate data on undocumented immigrants to exclude them from congressional apportionment.
