= Bruce K. Chapman =

American politician & diplomat (born 1940)

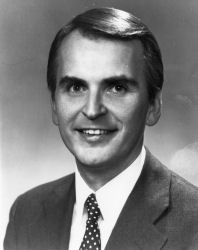
- Chapman, c. 1981

2nd United States Ambassador to the United Nations International Organizations in Vienna
- In office August 1, 1985 – October 16, 1988
- President: Ronald Reagan
- Preceded by: Richard S. Williamson
- Succeeded by: Michael H. Newlin

16th Director of the United States Census Bureau
- In office January 15, 1981 – March 23, 1983
- President: Ronald Reagan
- Preceded by: Manuel D. Plotkin
- Succeeded by: John G. Keane

12th Secretary of State of Washington
- In office January 15, 1975 – January 14, 1981
- Governor: Daniel J. Evans; Dixy Lee Ray
- Preceded by: Lud Kramer
- Succeeded by: Ralph Munro

Personal details
- Born: December 1, 1940 (age 85) Evanston, Illinois, U.S.
- Party: Republican
- Spouse: Sarah Gilmore Williams
- Relations: Edith Roosevelt Derby Williams (mother-in-law)
- Children: 2
- Education: Harvard University (BA)

Military service
- Allegiance: United States
- Branch/service: United States Air Force
- Years of service: 1965-69

Bruce Kerry Chapman (born December 1, 1940) is the founder and current chairman of the board of the Discovery Institute, an American conservative think tank often associated with the religious right. He was previously a journalist, a Republican politician, and a diplomat. He is the author, most recently, of Politicians: The Worst Kind of People to Run the Government, Except for All the Others (Discovery Institute Press, 2018).

== Early life and career ==
Born in Evanston, Illinois, Chapman graduated from Harvard University in 1962, served in the U.S. Air Force Reserves, and worked as an editorial writer for the New York Herald Tribune. With his college roommate George Gilder, Chapman wrote an attack on the anti-intellectual policies of Barry Goldwater titled The Party That Lost Its Head (1966). In 1966 he moved to Seattle and wrote a book entitled The Wrong Man in Uniform, arguing against conscription, and for an all-volunteer military (Trident Press, 1967).

Chapman became active in politics through the Seattle Young Republicans, and became a member of the United States Republican Party. He was elected to the Seattle City Council in 1971. In 1975, he was appointed Secretary of State of Washington, and won election twice (1975, 1976). He campaigned for the office of Governor of Washington in 1980, but ultimately did not win the Republican nomination.

Chapman was appointed by President Ronald Reagan to the position of Director of the United States Census Bureau and served in that role from 1981 until 1983. Between 1983 and 1985 he was Deputy Assistant to President Reagan and Director of the White House Office of Planning and Evaluation. From 1985 to 1988 he served in the appointed position of United States Ambassador to the United Nations International Organizations in Vienna. His portfolio included nuclear proliferation, refugees, economic development, and the control of narcotics.

== Intelligent design ==
From 1988 to 1990, Chapman was a fellow at the Hudson Institute, a conservative think tank. Chapman left the Hudson Institute in 1990 and cofounded the Discovery Institute along with George Franklin Gilder in 1991. (Note: founded in 1991 per IRS Form-990) The institute is best known as the hub of the pseudoscientific Intelligent design movement, and also focuses on a broad range of issues, including: economics, transportation, technology, and citizen leadership. In 2011, Chapman became chairman of the Discovery Institute.

== Notes ==
| Preceded by Lud Kramer | Secretary of State of Washington; 1975–1981 | Succeeded by Ralph Munro |
| Preceded by Manuel D. Plotkin | Director of the United States Census Bureau; 1981 – 1983 | Succeeded by John G. Keane |
Diplomatic posts
| Preceded by Richard S. Williamson | United States Ambassador to the United Nations International Organizations in Vienna; 1985 - 1988 | Succeeded by Michael H. Newlin |
