= Robert Groves =

American sociologist

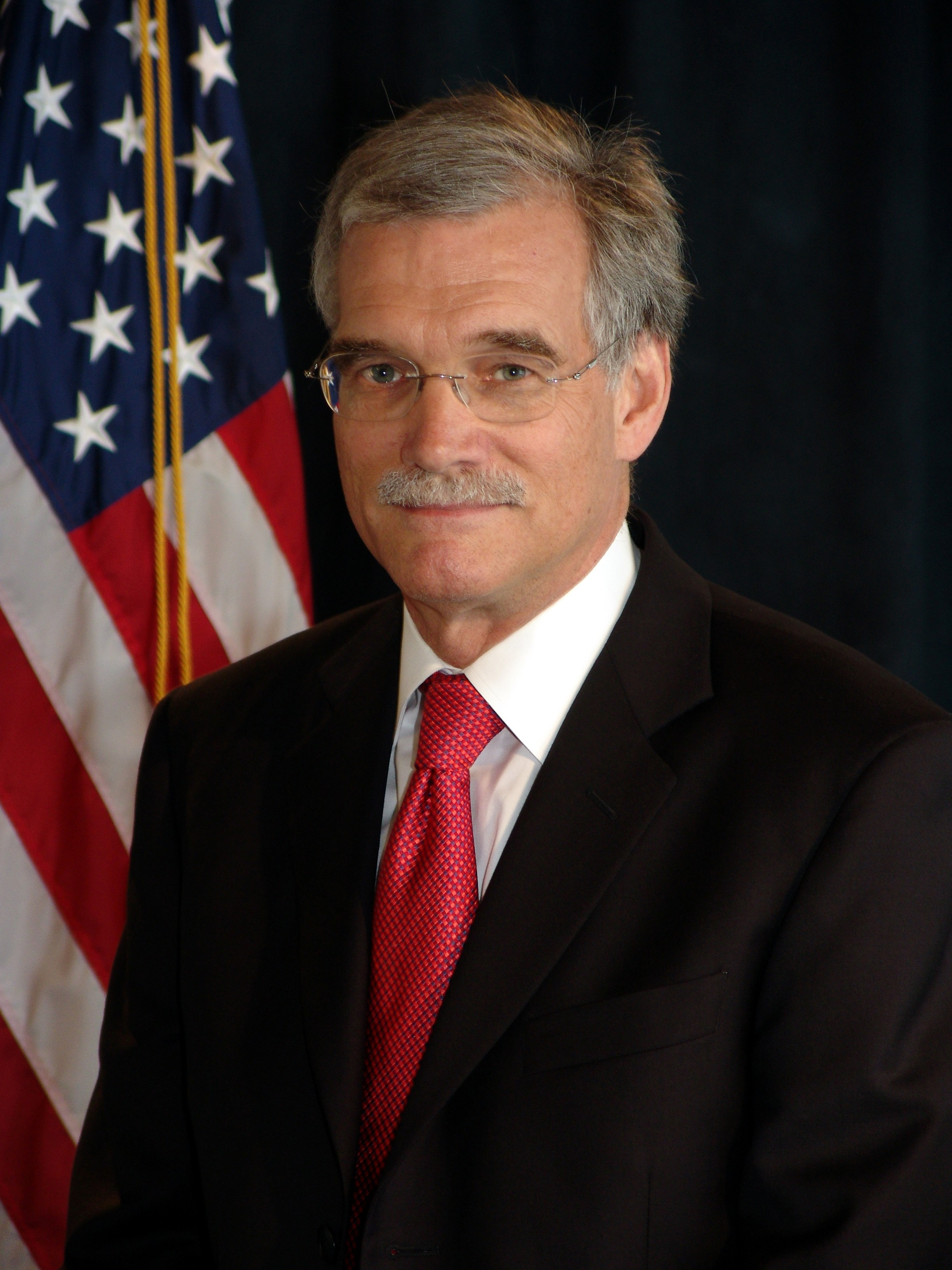
- Official portrait, 2009

Interim President of Georgetown University
- In office November 21, 2024 – July 1, 2026
- Preceded by: John J. DeGioia
- Succeeded by: Eduardo Peñalver

Director of the United States Census Bureau
- In office July 15, 2009 – August 11, 2012
- President: Barack Obama
- Preceded by: Thomas Mesenbourg (acting)
- Succeeded by: Thomas Mesenbourg (acting)

Personal details
- Born: Robert Martin Groves; September 27, 1948 (age 78) Kansas City, Missouri, U.S.
- Education: Dartmouth College (BA); University of Michigan (MA, MA, PhD)

Robert Martin Groves (born September 27, 1948) is an American sociologist and survey methodology scholar, currently serving as the senior advisor to the president of Georgetown University, following a term as interim president of Georgetown University from November 2024 to July 2026.

He served as executive vice president and provost of Georgetown University from August 2012 to November 2024 and as the 23rd director of the United States Census Bureau from 2009 to 2012.

== Early life and education ==
Groves was born in Kansas City, Missouri, and grew up in Metairie, Louisiana. He graduated in 1966 from De La Salle High School in New Orleans, Louisiana.

In 1970, Groves graduated summa cum laude and Phi Beta Kappa from Dartmouth College, receiving a Bachelor of Arts degree with a major in sociology. He later received two Master of Arts degrees (sociology and statistics, both 1973) and a Doctor of Philosophy (sociology, 1975) from the University of Michigan.

== Academic career ==
For much of his career, starting in 1975, Groves worked as a research professor in survey methodology at the University of Michigan. He was also a researcher in the Joint Program in Survey Methodology, housed at the University of Maryland, College Park. In August 2012, he became the provost of Georgetown University, succeeding James J. O'Donnell and is also the Gerard J. Campbell, S.J. Professor in the Math and Statistics Department as well as the Sociology Department.

In 1982 Groves was elected as a Fellow of the American Statistical Association. He was elected to the National Academy of Sciences in 2011 and is a fellow of the American Academy of Arts and Sciences.

== Government career ==
When Groves was an associate director at the United States Census Bureau in the early 1990s, he argued that potentially millions of minorities who typically voted Democratic were being undercounted. Groves advocated for the use of statistical adjustments to account for this discrepancy. George H. W. Bush's Commerce Secretary Robert Mosbacher blocked this suggestion. The Census Bureau is a component of the U.S. Department of Commerce.

On April 2, 2009, Groves was nominated by President Barack Obama to head the Census Bureau. During his confirmation hearings, Republican senators raised concerns based on Groves' previous actions that he would apply statistical adjustments to populations believed to be undercounted, thereby inflating their numbers and affecting the apportionment of congressional seats. Groves ruled out the use of statistical adjustments during the hearings and his nomination quickly proceeded to the full Senate in May. However, senators Richard Shelby and David Vitter continued to delay his confirmation due to lingering worries regarding statistical adjustments. They also sought assurance from the Obama administration that the controversial community group ACORN would not be involved in grassroots outreach related to the 2010 Census. On July 13, 2009, after several weeks of opposition by the two senators, Senate majority leader Harry Reid used a procedural motion to force a vote that confirmed Groves, 76–15. He took office July 15, 2009.

On June 13, 2014, President Obama announced his appointment of Groves to the National Science Board of the National Science Foundation.

== Publishing history ==
Groves is the author of several books, including:

- Surveying Victims (2008) ISBN 0-309-11598-1
- Survey Errors and Survey Costs (2004) first published in 1989 ISBN 0-471-67851-1, and named "one of the 50 most influential books in survey research" by the American Association for Public Opinion Research
- Survey Methodology (2010) Second edition of the (2004) first edition ISBN 0-471-48348-6
- Survey Nonresponse (2001) ISBN 0-471-39627-3
- Nonresponse in Household Interview Surveys (1998) ISBN 0-471-18245-1

Groves is the editor of several books, including:

- Measurement Errors in Surveys (2004) ISBN 0-471-69280-8
- Telephone Survey Methodology (2001) ISBN 0-471-20956-2

Political offices
Preceded by Thomas Mesenbourg; Acting	Director of the Census Bureau; 2009–2012	Succeeded by Thomas Mesenbourg; Acting
Academic offices
Preceded by James J. O'Donnell	Provost of Georgetown University; 2012–present	Incumbent
Preceded by John J. DeGioia	President of Georgetown University; Acting; 2024–present	Succeeded by Eduardo Peñalver; Designate
