= The State of The USA =

The State of the USA is a non-profit group that seeks to present non-partisan data on key national indicators of the United States.

The group works with the United States National Academy of Sciences in creating a federally mandated Key National Indicator System (KNIS).

== See also ==
- Economy of the United States
