= International Social Survey Programme =

Statistical Survey

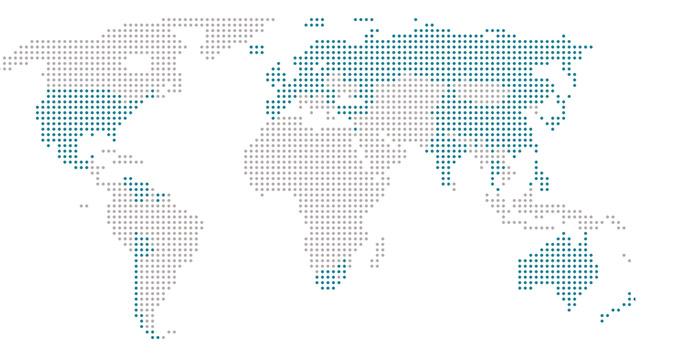
International Social Survey Programme Members (2016)

The International Social Survey Programme (ISSP) is a collaboration between different nations conducting surveys covering topics which are useful for social science research. The ISSP researchers develop questions which are meaningful and relevant to all countries which can be expressed in an equal manner in different languages. The results of the surveys provide a cross-national and cross-cultural perspective to individual national studies. By 2021, 58 countries have already taken part in the ISSP.

== History ==
The ISSP was founded in 1984 by research organizations from four countries:

- Zentrum für Umfragen, Methoden, und Analysen (ZUMA), Mannheim, Germany, now GESIS – Leibniz Institute for the Social Sciences
- National Opinion Research Center (NORC), University of Chicago, Chicago, Illinois, United States.
- Social and Community Planning Research (SCPR), London, United Kingdom, now National Centre for Social Research, NatCen
- Research School of Social Sciences (RSSS), Australian National University, now School of Demography Canberra, Australia.

Four different Social Surveys included a common module each year:

- The British Social Attitudes Survey (BSA) in the UK
- The General Social Survey (GSS) in the USA
- The ALLBUS or German General Social Survey (GGSS) in Germany and
- The Surveys by the Research School of Social Sciences

Since then social science institutions from 58 different countries included a 15-minute supplement to their national surveys. The membership to the ISSP is institutional and by country. One or more than one institute in a country can co-operate on ISSP research (cf. France and Spain). The common module surveyed by the member institutions also contains an extensive common core of background variables. The modules focus on one specific topic each year and were planned to be repeated more or less every five to ten years. When it comes to the researchers choice of topics, the relevance of the area of social sciences in the year of the survey is taken into account. Given this, the ISSP deliveries data sets are helpful for both Cross-sectional studies and Time series analysis. Over time the set of modules has grown towards more diverse topics. The latest additions were Leisure Time and Sports in 2007 as well as Health and Health Care in 2011.

== Organisation ==
The ISSP is a self-funding organisation with an emphasis on democratic decision making stated in its working principles. To accomplish this principle it has set up several groups and committees. These groups either consist of member organisations as a whole or include some particular social scientists. There are:

- The ISSP secretariat (2021-2024): FORS - Swiss Centre for Expertise in the Social Sciences, Switzerland
- The ISSP archive (GESIS Data Archive for the Social Sciences, Germany)
- Methodology research groups
- The ISSP sub-groups drawn up within the ISSP
- Drafting groups for modules
- The ISSP Standing Committee

Most of the members of these groups are elected democratically at the General Assembly. These meetings of delegates from every member state of the ISSP are held in May or June in changing locations all around the world. The General Assemblies also serve the function of discussing modules, which are to be completed the same year or begun and surveyed the upcoming one. The delegates also discuss the topics of upcoming modules.

The ISSP also gives importance to the way member organisations implement their surveys. The organisation's principles are published in its ethical statement and its working principles.

== Methodology ==
The methodological work in the ISSP is coordinated by a Methodology Committee, consisting of six members elected at the General Meeting. It co-ordinates the work of six groups addressing different areas of cross-cultural methods, all concerned with issues of equivalence: demography, non-response, weighting, mode effects, questionnaire design and translation.

== Modules by year ==
The datasets from the different modules conducted by participating ISSP member states can be downloaded at the GESIS Archive page. All these links lead to the official GESIS – Leibniz Institute for the Social Sciences homepage, where the data is provided openly for research purposes.

Year	Module
2020	Environment IV
2019	Social Inequality V
2018	Religion IV
2017	Social Networks and Social Resources III
2016	Role of Government V
2015	Work Orientations IV
2014	Citizenship II
2013	National Identity III
2012	Family and Changing Gender Roles IV
2011	Health and Health Care
2010	Environment III
2009	Social Inequality IV

2008	Religion III
2007	Leisure Time and Sports
2006	Role of Government IV
2005	Work Orientations III
2004	Citizenship
2003	National Identity II
2002	Family and Changing Gender Roles III
2001	Social Relations and Support Systems ('Social Networks II')
2000	Environment II
1999	Social Inequality III
1998	Religion II
1997	Work Orientations II

1996	Role of Government III
1995	National Identity I
1994	Family and Changing Gender Roles II
1993	Environment I
1992	Social Inequality II
1991	Religion I
1990	Role of Government II
1989	Work Orientations I
1988	Family and Changing Gender Roles I
1987	Social Inequality I
1986	Social Networks and Support Systems I
1985	Role of Government I

== Modules by topic ==
Citizenship 2004 2014 Environment 1993 2000 2010 2020 Family and Changing Gender Roles 1988 1994 2002 2012 2022 Health and Healthcare 2011 2021	Leisure Time & Sports 2007 National Identity 1995 2003 2013 Religion 1991 1998 2008 2018 Role of Government 1985 1990 1996 2006 2016	Social Networks 1986 2001 2017 Social Inequality 1987 1992 1999 2009 2019 Work Orientation 1989 1997 2005 2015 2025 National Identity and Citizenship 2023 Digital Societies 2024

== Members (1984–2021) ==
Australia Austria Belgium (former member) Bangladesh Bolivia (former member) Brazil (former member) Bulgaria Canada Chile China Croatia Cyprus (former member) Czech Republic Denmark	Dominican Republic (former member) Estonia Finland France (Georgia (country)) Georgia Germany Greece Hungary Iceland India (Republic of Ireland) Ireland (former member) Israel Italy Japan	Latvia (former member) Lithuania Mexico Netherlands (former member) New Zealand Norway Philippines Poland Portugal (former member) Romania (former member) Russia Slovakia Slovenia South Africa	South Korea Spain Suriname Sweden Switzerland Taiwan Thailand Tunisia Turkey Uruguay (former member) (United Kingdom) UK United States Venezuela

Country	Organization
Austria	Institute of Sociology, University of Graz.
Bangladesh	SRG Bangladesh
Belgium	The Administration of Planning and Statistics of the Ministry of Flanders.; Walloon Institute of Assessment, Forecasting and Statistics (IWEPS). (former member)
Bolivia	Aru Foundation (former member)
Brazil	Instituto Universitário de Pesquisas do Rio de Janeiro. (former member)
Bulgaria	The Agency for Social Analyses (ASA).
Canada	School of Journalism and Communication, Carleton University. (former member)
Chile	Centro de Estudios Publicos.
China	National Survey Research Center at Renmin University of China; Institute for Empirical Social Science Research Xi'an Jiaotong University
Croatia	Institute for Social Research in Zagreb
Cyprus (former member)	Center of Applied Research (CAR), Cyprus College. (former member)
Czech Republic	Institute of Sociology, Academy of Sciences of the Czech Republic
Denmark	Department of Politics and Society, Aalborg University
Dominican Republic	Fundacion Global Democracia y Desarrollo (FUNGLODE). (former member)
Estonia	Institute of International and Social Studies, School of Governance, Law and Society, Tallinn University
Finland	Faculty of Social Sciences, University of Tampere.; Statistics Finland.; Finnish Social Science Data Archive.
France	PACTE, Institut d'Etudes Politiques de Grenoble, Domaine Universitaire; Centre for Socio-Political Data (CDSP); Centre Maurice Halbwachs; Together these Organizations also present data on an ISSP France Homepage
Germany	GESIS – Leibniz Institute for the Social Sciences
(Georgia (country)) Georgia	Center for Social Sciences (CSS)
Hungary	TÁRKI, Social Research Institute, Budapest (TÁRKI RT)
Iceland	Social Science Research Institute University of Iceland
(Republic of Ireland) Ireland	Social Science Research Centre University College Dublin. (former member)
Israel	The B.I. and Lucille Cohen Institute for Public Opinion Research, Tel Aviv University.
Italy	The Department of Social and Political Sciences, University of Milan
Japan	NHK Broadcasting Culture Research Institute.
Latvia	Advanced Social and Political Research Institute , University of Latvia. (former member)
Mexico	The Institute of Marketing and Opinion
The Netherlands	The Faculty of Social Sciences, Vrije Universiteit.
New Zealand	COMPASS - Centre of Methods and Policy Application in the Social Sciences, University of Auckland.
Norway	Norwegian Centre for Research Data (NSD).
The Philippines	Social Weather Stations.
Poland	Institute for Social Studies (ISS), University of Warsaw.
Portugal	Instituto de Ciências Sociais (ICS), University of Lisbon. (former member)
Romania	RQSA - Romanian Quantitative Studies Association. (former member)
Russia	The Levada Center.
Slovakia	The Institute for Sociology of the Slovak Academy of Sciences.
Slovenia	Public Opinion and Mass Communication Research Centre (CJMMK), University of Ljubljana.
South Africa	Human Science Research Council.
South Korea	Survey Research Center (SRC), Sungkyunkwan University.
Spain	Análisis Sociológicos, Económicos y Políticos (ASEP).; CIS (Center for Sociological Research).
Suriname	Anton de Kom University of Suriname
Sweden	Department of Sociology, University of Umeå
Switzerland	FORS – Swiss Centre of Expertise in Social Sciences, Lausanne
Taiwan	Institute of Sociology and Center for Survey Research Academia Sinica
Thailand	King Prajadhipok’s Institute (KPI)
Turkey	Istanbul Policy Centre (IPC)
Uruguay	Department of Economics (deCON), Faculty of Social Sciences; Institute of Statistics (IEsta), Faculty of Economics and Administration, University of Uruguay. (former member)
United Kingdom	NatCen Social Research as part of the British Social Attitudes Survey.
United States	National Opinion Research Center (NORC), University of Chicago.
Venezuela	Laboratorio de Ciencias Sociales (LACSO).

== Bibliography ==
- Davis, James A., and Roger Jowell. "Measuring national differences: an introduction to the International Social Survey Programme (ISSP)." British Social Attitudes: Special International Report, edited by Roger Jowell, Sharon Witherspoon, and Lindsay Brook. Aldershot: Gower (1989): 1-13.
- Smith, Tom W. "The international social survey program." International Journal of Public Opinion Research 4.3 (1992): 1992.
- Max Haller, Roger Jowell et Tom Smith (dir.), Charting the Globe: The International Social Survey Programme, 1984-2009, London, Routledge, 2009 (ISBN 978-0-415-49192-1)
