= Self-censorship =

Act of censoring or classifying one's own discourse

Self-censorship is the act of censoring or classifying one's own discourse, typically out of fear or deference to the perceived preferences, sensibilities, or infallibility of others, and often without overt external pressure. Self-censorship is commonly exhibited by film producers, directors, publishers, journalists, musicians, and social media personalities.

Article 19 of the Universal Declaration of Human Rights guarantees freedom of speech from all forms of censorship. Article 19 explicitly states that "everyone has the right to freedom of opinion and expression; this right includes freedom to hold opinions without interference and to seek, receive and impart information and ideas through any media and regardless of frontiers."

The practice of self-censorship, like that of censorship itself, has a long history.

== Reasons for self-censorship ==
=== Social exclusion ===
People often communicate to affirm their identity and sense of belonging. People may express their opinions or withhold their opinions due to the fear of social exclusion or unpopularity. Shared social norms and beliefs create a sense of belonging, but they can also create a suppression of expression in order to comply or belong. People may adjust their beliefs or opinions to go along with the majority attitude. There are different factors that contribute to self-censorship, such as gender, age, education, political interests, and media exposure. For some, the reason for their change in beliefs and opinions is rooted in fear of isolation and exclusion. For these people, the expression of their own beliefs is less important than the fear of negative reactions of others to the expression of those beliefs.

Religious affiliation is a topic in which many occupational fields and areas may be a source of self-censorship. One particular area is psychology. From the origins of psychology, the field has frequently viewed religion with distrust. Psychologists and therapists often refrain from claiming to be part of any religion believing in the possibility that any expressions of any devout faith may be viewed as markers for mental illness or distress. A 2013 survey from the American Psychological Association (APA) found that "relative to the general population, psychologists were more than twice likely to claim no religion, three times more likely to describe religion as unimportant in their lives, and five times more likely to deny belief in God."

Self-censorship is more common among fundamentalist believers like Wahhabism, Islamism, Calvinism, and Hasidic Judaism.

The political cordon sanitaire was associated with self-censorship. Concepts like political correctness and spiral of silence have been found to contribute to the existence of self-censorship. According to a 2019 German survey on self-censorship conducted by the Institut für Demoskopie Allensbach for the newspaper Frankfurter Allgemeine Zeitung (FAZ), 59% of respondents said they can express their views among friends, but only 18% believe the same is possible in public. Only 17% of respondents express themselves freely on the Internet.

=== Economic ===
Self-censorship can also occur in order to conform to the expectations of the market. For example, the editor of a periodical may consciously or unconsciously avoid topics that will anger advertisers, customers, or the owners in order to protect their livelihood either directly (i.e., fear of losing their job) or indirectly (e.g., a belief that a book will be more profitable if it does not contain offensive material). This phenomenon is sometimes referred to as soft censorship.

=== Legal ===
In authoritarian countries, creators of artworks may remove material that their government might find controversial for fear of sanction by their governments.

=== Taste and decency ===
Taste and decency are other areas in which questions are often raised regarding self-censorship. Art or journalism involving images or footage of murder, terrorism, war and massacres may cause complaints as to the purpose to which they are put. Curators and editors will frequently censor these images to avoid charges of prurience, shock tactics or invasion of privacy.

Products intended for children and youthful audiences, such as young adult literature, can be affected by self-censorship in this context.

When the director of the Los Angeles Museum of Contemporary Art was interviewed regarding his decision to whitewash an antiwar mural showing dollar-draped military coffins, he speculated that the mural would have offended the community in which it was placed. He then added that "there were zero complaints, because I took care of it right away".

=== As a form of preference falsification ===
Self-censorship is a form of preference falsification, though the concepts are not identical. Self-censorship is a passive act. It amounts to the suppression of potentially objectionable beliefs, opinions, and preferences. Thus, it amounts to self-silencing; it is an act of passivity. Preference falsification is the misrepresentation of one's preferences under perceived social pressures. It is often performative, as it can involve the active manipulation of one's preferences to impress an audience or avoid its wrath.

For an illustration, consider a discussion on a controversial subject. We are among the participants. If we keep quiet, that is self-censorship. Insofar as our silence conveys agreement with a position that we actually dislike, our self-censorship amounts also to preference falsification. If instead of keeping quiet, we speak up during the discussion in favor of position A, when we actually favor B, that is preference falsification but not self-censorship. In pretending to like A, we have gone beyond self-censorship. We have deliberately projected a contrived opinion. In a nutshell, preference falsification is the broader concept. Whereas all self-censorship falsifies a preference through the signals it sends, preference falsification need not take the form of self-censorship.

== In media ==
Journalists often censor themselves due to threats against them or their interests from another party, editorial instructions from their supervisor[s], perceived conflicts of interest with a media organization's economic sponsors, advertisers or shareholders, etc.). Self-censorship of journalists is most pervasive in societies where governments have official media censorship policies and where journalists will be jailed, fined, or simply lose their job if they do not follow the censorship rules. Organizations such as Media Matters for America, Fairness and Accuracy in Reporting, Democracy Now! and the American Civil Liberties Union have raised concerns about news broadcasting stations, particularly Fox News, censoring their own content to be less controversial when reporting on certain types of issues such as the war on terror.

In their book Manufacturing Consent (1988), Noam Chomsky and Edward S. Herman argue that corporate ownership of news media very strongly encourages systematic self-censorship owing to market forces. In this argument, even with supposedly liberal media, bias and (often unconscious) self-censorship is evident in the selection and omission of news stories, and the framing of acceptable discussion, in line with the interests of the corporations owning those media.

The journalists have actively sought censorship advice from military authorities in order to prevent the inadvertent revelation of military secrets. In 2009, The New York Times succeeded in suppressing news of a reporter's abduction by militants in Afghanistan for seven months until his escape from captivity in order to "reduce danger to the reporter and other hostages".

Journalists have sometimes self-censored publications of news stories out of concern for the safety of people involved. Jean Pelletier, the Washington D.C. correspondent for the Montreal La Presse newspaper, uncovered a covert attempt by the Canadian government to smuggle US diplomats out of Iran during the Iranian hostage crisis before the "Canadian Caper" had reached its conclusion. In order to preserve the safety of those involved, he refused to allow the paper to publish the story until the hostages had left Iran, despite the considerable news value to the paper and writer.

Self-censorship by journalists has been described as a form of a survival strategy, allowing journalists to report on some issues rather than going too far and risking a more complete crackdown by the authorities, resulting in even less independent reporting.

=== In social media ===
On social media, algospeak is a self-censorship phenomenon in which users adopt coded expressions to evade real or imagined automated content moderation. It allows users to discuss topics deemed sensitive to moderation algorithms while avoiding penalties such as shadow banning, downranking, or de-monetization of content. A type of netspeak, algospeak primarily serves to bypass censorship, though it can also reinforce group belonging, especially in marginalized communities. Algospeak has been identified as one source of linguistic change in the modern era, with some terms spreading into everyday offline speech and writing. The term has been used more broadly to include any language change driven by digital usage.

== In science ==
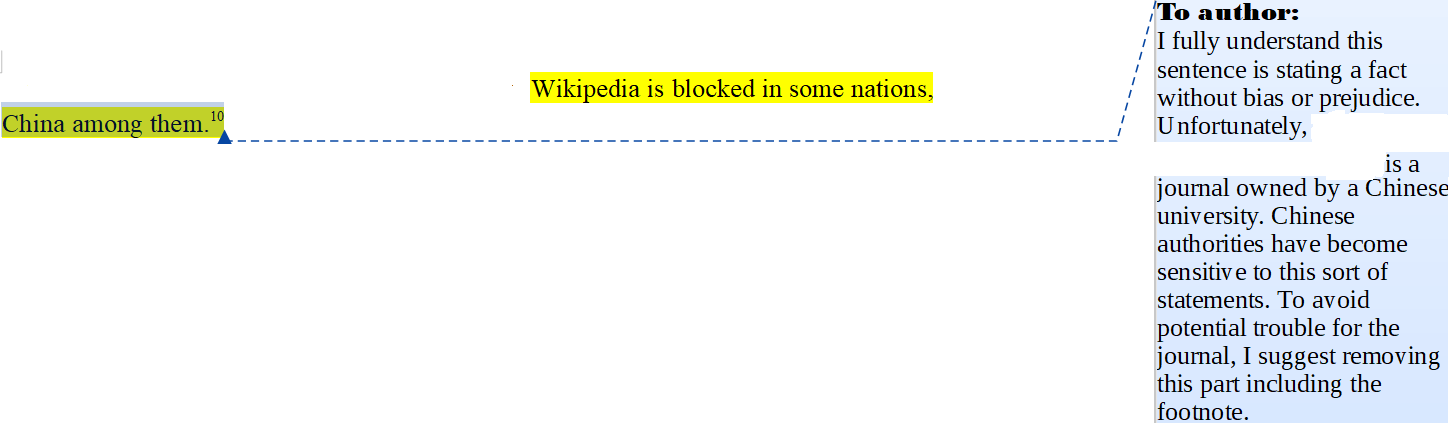
Self-censorship in a Chinese academic journal: an editor asks the article's author to remove a sentence about the blocking of Wikipedia in mainland China as it could cause trouble with the "authorities".

Self-censorship is found in the world of academia in a number of contexts. Self-censorship in scientific publications that have been criticized as politically motivated include scientists in Nazi Germany withholding findings that disagreed with the commonly held beliefs in differences between races, or the refusal of these scientists under Hitler to support general relativity (which got the reputation as "Jewish science"). In the 2000s, certain scientists have withheld their findings related to climate changes caused by pollution and to endangered species.

=== Risks from scientific publications ===
In the early days of atomic physics, it was realized that discoveries regarding nuclear fission and the chain reaction might be used for both beneficial and harmful purposes – on the one hand, such discoveries could have important applications for medicine and energy production, however on the other hand, they might also lead to the production of unprecedented weapons of mass destruction. Leo Szilard argues that if dangerous discoveries were kept secret, the development and use of such weapons might be avoided. Similarly, findings in the field of medicine and biotechnology could facilitate the production of biological weapons of mass destruction. In 2003, members of the Journal Editors and Authors Group, 32 leading journal editors, perceived the threat from biological warfare as sufficiently high to warrant a system of self-censorship on the public dissemination of certain aspects of their community's research. The statement agreed on declared:

We recognize that the prospect of bioterrorism has raised legitimate concerns about the potential abuse of published information... We are committed to dealing responsibly and effectively with safety and security issues that may be raised by papers submitted for publication, and to increasing our capacity to identify such issues as they arise...[O]n occasions an editor may conclude that the potential harm of publication outweighs the potential societal benefits... the paper should be modified, or not be published...

== By region ==
=== Africa ===
Self-censorship has been found to affect journalists in a number of less-democratic African states, such as Ethiopia, Uganda and Zambia.

=== Central Asia ===
Widespread practice of self-censorship has been described as significantly detrimental to the development of independent journalism in Central Asia.

=== China ===
In China, the media and citizens have to go to even greater extents to censor much of the material that they would post online. Many companies have been shut down by the government because of the content that they have published. Nearly 10,000 social media accounts in October 2018 were shut down that published entertainment and celebrity news, and 370 different streaming apps were pulled off of the app stores for non-compliance. Due to these high numbers of government interference, the companies and networks that publish on the internet are now employing people and utilizing sophisticated programs to find videos and pictures that are offensive and remove them before the government can get them in trouble.

Self-censorship by Western companies trying to appease Chinese authorities has also affected the quality of content available to the citizens in other countries. It increasingly affects video games, including those by Western developers who want to sell their products to Chinese gamers as well.

=== Colombia ===
Self-censorship has been found to affect Colombian journalism.

=== Europe ===
Examples of self-censorship have been found in a number of European countries in different contexts. European Union officials have been accused of self-censorship on topics deemed sensitive by China, in order to avoid diplomatic rifts between China and EU. Threats to media freedom have shown a significant increase in recent years in Europe. Journalists and whistleblowers have experienced physical and psychological intimidation and threats. Self-censorship is one of the major consequences of such circumstances. A study published in 2017 by the Council of Europe found that in the period 2014–2016 that 40% of journalists involved in the survey experienced some kind of unwarranted interference, in particular psychological violence, including slandering and smear campaigning, cyberbullying. Other forms of unwarranted interference include intimidation by interest groups, threats with force, intimidation by political groups, targeted surveillance, intimidation by the police, etc. In terms of geography, cases of physical assault were more common in the South Caucasus, followed by Turkey, but were present in other regions as well.

=== Indonesia ===
In the early 2010s, self-censorship was studied in the context of professional practice of many Indonesian newspaper journalists.

=== Israel ===
Self-censorship was found in Israeli media during the Second Lebanon War. It has also been found to affect a number of debates related to the Israeli–Palestinian conflict.

=== Pakistan ===
Self-censorship practices have been studied in the context of the Pakistani media in 2000s.

=== Russia ===
Self-censorship existed in Russia for a long time. After a brief relaxation following the fall of communism in the 1990s, self-censorship once again became a quite frequent practice in Russia after 2000s government take-overs and consolidation of media, further deepened after the 2014–2015 laws on "undesirable organisations" and the invasion of Ukraine, which began on February 24, 2022.

=== Turkey ===
Self-censorship has increased in Turkey as press freedoms declined under the Justice and Development Party (AKP) government in the late 2000s. Affected areas include among others the discussion of the Armenian genocide.

=== United States ===
According to AmeriSpeak survey, 40% of Americans did not feel free to speak their mind in 2019. About 60% of college students reported that they did not feel comfortable expressing their views of campus at times. According to an article published by political scientists James L. Gibson and Joseph L. Sutherland, rates of self-censorship in America in 2020 had increased to 46%, up from 13% in 1954. Alternatively, according to an article by John. K Wilson, this may be an indicator of acceptable discourse becoming wider, not narrower. As a result of Trump's threats against the media and government targeting of his political opponents during his second presidency, media executives instructed journalists and their staff to self-censor and reduce criticism of Trump.

== See also ==
- Algospeak
- Bradley effect
- Chinese censorship abroad
- Chilling effect
- Euphemism
- Hawthorne effect
- Information hazard
- List of songs deemed inappropriate by Clear Channel following the September 11, 2001 attacks
- Media bias
- Newspeak
- OB marker
- Overton window
- Opinion corridor
- Preference falsification
- Political correctness
- Social-desirability bias
- Thought suppression
