= Wordsum =

Verbal intelligence test in GSS

Wordsum is a 10-item vocabulary test that has been included as an item on the General Social Survey (GSS) in most survey years since 1974. Each of the test's items ranges in difficulty from very easy to very difficult. It is widely used in research in the social and behavioral sciences. It is taken by about 1,000 people in each year in which it is included as part of the GSS. Its administration involves showing respondents a card containing 10 words, and then asking them to find the synonym for each of them out of a set of five choices. Although most researchers have implicitly assumed that each item on the test deserves equal weight, its validity can be improved by considering the variance for each word separately.
