= GGSS =

GGSS may refer to:

- German General Social Survey, a national data generation program in Germany
- Gordon Graydon Memorial Secondary School, a high school in Brampton, Ontario, Canada
- Geetha Govinda Samskrita Sangha, an organization to promote Sanskrit all throughout the world.
