= Canadian Index of Wellbeing =

Canadian Index of Wellbeing

The Canadian Index of Wellbeing (CIW) is a composite index, composed of eight interconnected domains that measures stability and change in the wellbeing of Canadians over time. The CIW describes wellbeing as, "The presence of the highest possible quality of life in its full breadth of expression, focused on but not necessarily exclusive to: good living standards, robust health, a sustainable environment, vital communities, an educated populace, balanced time use, high levels of democratic participation, and access to and participation in leisure and culture". The CIW acts as a companion measure of societal progress to the Gross Domestic Product (GDP), which is based solely upon economic productivity.

== Description ==
The Canadian Index of Wellbeing is part of a global movement that recognises the contribution of various domains of life to wellbeing. In Canada, these domains include community vitality, democratic engagement, education, environment, healthy populations, leisure and culture, living standards, and time use. By monitoring wellbeing objective and subjective indicators, both policy makers and the general public can advocate for social change important to promoting the highest level of wellbeing for all citizens. The CIW follows a similar approach to a social determinants of health perspective, with the premise that multiple, interrelated social and environmental factors contribute to the wellbeing of Canadians. The Public Health Agency of Canada also shares this approach.

Beyond providing a companion measure to GDP, one of the primary objectives of the CIW is to identify interconnections among numerous factors that affect the wellbeing of Canadians. Examining wellbeing from a multidimensional perspective, the CIW recognises that policy decisions and programmes can affect the experiences, perceptions, and opportunities beyond the specific area for which they were intended. For instance, efforts to enhance the physical health of a population can decrease the necessity for health care treatment, which, in turn, frees up additional resources to fund education. Likewise, a sustainable environment can influence public health, contribute to more vibrant communities, and create opportunities for leisure and recreation. The challenge is for policy shapers and decision makers to effectively make use of the CIW to influence policies and legislation in order to improve the wellbeing of all Canadians.

== History ==
The CIW is a citizen-driven initiative, which differs from other countries where government is actively involved in measuring and promoting wellbeing (e.g., UK, Italy, France, Germany, Australia, Bhutan). Accordingly, the CIW is guided by core Canadian values and is non-partisan.

The motivation for the development of the Canadian Index of Wellbeing began with the Atkinson Charitable Foundation (ACF) in Toronto, Ontario. The ACF organized a workshop in 1999 which brought together experts in social indicators research to consider the question, "What would it take to create a tool to measure the wellbeing of Canadians?" It was agreed that such an endeavour would require a strong management structure, adequate financial support for the length of the project, and importantly, a solid base of rigorous research in order to ensure validity and credibility. Accordingly, the ACF initiated a comprehensive process in 2000 for developing what would eventually become the Canadian Index of Wellbeing.

The process incorporated expert advice, broad public consultations, and contributions of research teams from across Canada, as well as discussions with government officials and potential users. The development of the CIW involved three overlapping stages between 2001 and 2010: (1) the identification of the key domains associated with Canadians' quality of life, (2) the identification of indicators directly associated with wellbeing in each of these domains and compilation of relevant data, and (3) the consolidation of a composite index for each domain and for the CIW composite index, collectively bringing together all of the domains and their specific indicators.

Numerous strategies for gathering information from Canadians were used to identify the domains of wellbeing that comprise the CIW. First, in alliance with the Canadian Policy Research Network (CPRN) in 2000, public consultations were undertaken across Canada involving 350 participants in 40 discussion groups. Canadians were asked to describe which aspects of life they felt were directly related to their wellbeing and contributed most to their quality of life. The CPRN subsequently released a series of reports identifying the thematic areas Canadians believed were most influential These reports outlined specific areas and indicators of quality of life suggested by discussion group participants

Next, in 2002 and again in 2004, the ACF hosted a round-table discussion and workshop and invited more than 60 experts on social indicators and wellbeing. Participants' specializations included community development, economics, education, environmental studies, health promotion, political science, and recreation, arts, and culture. Practitioners and government officials who were potential users of the index also participated in these discussions, and collectively began reviewing and assessing the information required to narrow the focus to the domains specifically regarded by Canadians as most essential to overall quality of life. Some of the participants were invited by ACF to form a CIW Canadian Research Advisory Group (CRAG). The members of CRAG served as advisors on the validity and credibility of the process to determine the final domains and indicators of the CIW. CRAG continues to serve in an ongoing capacity to provide guidance on the trends and developments within each domain, review regular updates of the CIW, and promote research and knowledge exchange to ensure that the CIW reflects Canadians' perceptions and experiences of wellbeing. Based on the workshops and discussions from 1999 to 2004 and an ongoing environmental scan that identified, monitored, and considered other initiatives undertaken internationally, the CRAG selected in 2005 the final eight domains that would comprise the conceptual framework laid out by the CIW (see Figure 1).

In 2006, the ACF contracted EKOS Research Associates to conduct a series of 19 focus groups in 15 communities across Canada. Close to 250 individuals participated, including business leaders, government officials, Aboriginal peoples, members of the media, and representatives of non-governmental organisations (NGOs). In addition to these focus groups, CRAG delivered presentations regarding the emerging domains and indicators of wellbeing to a group of representatives from various NGOs and levels of government at a workshop hosted by the ACF. Following the participants' advice, additional refinements to the CIW conceptual framework and to the approach for consolidating the CIW composite measure were undertaken. The ACF organized two more rounds of consultations in 2007 and 2008. These discussions provided the opportunity for participants to be updated on progress towards finalizing the CIW, offer feedback on the conceptual structure, and initiate local networks of advocates who would eventually communicate the CIW to the broader public. From 2009 to the spring of 2011, the research teams for the eight domains completed their individual final reports. These reports provided a comprehensive literature review supporting the direct contribution of each domain to wellbeing. They also recommended indicators to be considered for inclusion in the composite index of the domain and eventually the composite index that would define the CIW. In 2011, coincident with the finalisation of the last of the eight domain reports, the CIW project moved from the ACF to the University of Waterloo. The project is housed in the Faculty of Applied Health Sciences where the research, community outreach, and knowledge transfer activities supported by the CIW can be further developed.

== Eight Domains of Wellbeing ==
The CIW is composed of eight domains, each of which includes eight separate indicators. The research teams identified key indicators representing each domain, which were directly linked to measures known to contribute or detract from wellbeing. Four main criteria were considered for the indicator selection. The first was validity, or the extent to which an indicator was directly correlated to wellbeing as indicated in the literature. Quality was the second criterion, which stated that an indicator must be derived from credible sources and enhance the understanding of a concept. Reliability, or consistency in the measurement of the indicator over the course of several years, was the third criterion. Fourth, feasibility meant that data had to be easily accessible. With these criteria in mind, eight to 14 central indicators were recommended by each team to represent their specific domain. For a positive indicator, an increase in numerical value meant an increase in that aspect of wellbeing; for a negative indicator, an increase in numerical value reflected a decrease in terms of wellbeing. Ultimately, the number of indicators was limited to eight per domain, for a total of 64 indicators representing the overall composite index of the CIW. Having selected the indicators, data were compiled for the years from 1994 onwards to establish longitudinal trends for each indicator and to prepare for consolidation into a composite index for each domain. The base year, 1994, was chosen to track the wellbeing of Canadians since the National Population Health Surveys were initiated in that year and were the source from which most of the health statistics were obtained. Even though the first CIW report was released in 2011, the selection of 2008 as the final review year for this release was based on the data availability for most of the headline indicators. The subsequent update in 2012 used data available up to and including 2010 for the same reason. Each of the domain reports and composite index report were peer reviewed by three Canadian and two international scholars before being released.

The domains of the CIW are as follows:

1. Community Vitality
2. Democratic Engagement
3. Education
4. Environment
5. Healthy Populations
6. Leisure and Culture
7. Living Standards
8. Time Use

== Data sources ==
The CIW is dependent upon regularly updated, credible, and reliable data to ensure it accurately reflects the wellbeing of Canadians. Statistics Canada surveys are the main source of data for the CIW. Data are drawn from various years and cycles of, among other sources, the General Social Survey, the Canadian Community Health Survey, the Labour Force Survey, the Canadian Survey of Giving, Volunteering, and Participating, the Canadian Election Surveys, and Environment Canada's Environmental indicators. For indicators where data are unavailable from Statistics Canada, other credible data sources are used such as the World Wildlife Fund's Living Planet Index (as part of the Environment domain), and the Canadian Centre for Economic Analysis's highly regarded Shelter Consumption Affordability Ratio (SCAR Index) (included in the Living Standards domain).

== Creating the composite index ==
To create comparable index values from the raw data, the baseline values for the 64 indicators were set at 100 for 1994 as the first step in standardisation and then percentage change in each indicator was calculated for each subsequent year. Improvement or deterioration in the measure from the baseline year is indicated by the percentage changes over the years. The CIW is a composite of the mean scores for each domain. In other words, for a given year, the mean composite scores of the eight domains are summed and then divided by eight, which generates an overall measure of wellbeing for Canadians. The various measures can be described at three levels. First, the composite index provides a holistic measure that is easily comparable to GDP. Second, the eight domain scores present a "dashboard" approach, which allows a snapshot of the relative status of diverse aspects of wellbeing. At the third level, the individual indicators contribute a more nuanced understanding of how specific aspects of wellbeing in each domain vary according to changes in social trends and policy over time.

== Uses of the CIW framework ==
The Canadian Index of Wellbeing conceptual framework provides a platform for policy considerations that can be used by various levels of government or within other organisations to facilitate and promote wellbeing. The holistic approach of using eight domains and an overall composite index provides an effective way to identify areas where further efforts might be required to enhance wellbeing. For example, the CIW can be disaggregated to show the changes in the wellbeing of populations at different geographical scales, from provincial to regional and the community level, or for different subgroups within the population. This allows researchers, policy makers, and citizens greater insight into the ways in which subpopulations differ with respect to wellbeing and to what extent. The composite index delivers information about the domains in which some groups, such as seniors or new immigrants, appear to enjoy a higher quality of life compared to the areas in which they are falling behind. These types of comparisons have the potential to facilitate greater collaboration among different groups and regions to share strategies and policy responses to address shortfalls.

== See also ==
- Subjective well-being
- Well-being
- Quality of life
- Gross National Happiness
- Bhutan GNH Index
- Happiness economics
