= Contentment =

Emotional state

Contentment is a moderate form of happiness, a state of being or emotion in which one is satisfied with their current life situation, and the state of affairs in one's life as they presently are. If one is content, they are at inner peace with their situation and how the elements in one's life are situated. Contrary to popular belief, it is possible to be content with one's life regardless of the circumstance, regardless of whether things are going as one expected or not.

The root of the word contentment comes from the Latin contentus, which means "held together" or "intact, whole." Originally, contentus was used to describe containers, like cups, buckets, or barrels. Later, the word evolved into something that could reflect onto a person, which describes one who feels complete, with no desires beyond themselves.

== General ==
Contentment is the capital which will never diminish.

— Ali ibn Abi Talib

Many religions have some form of eternal bliss or heaven as their goal, often contrasted with everlasting torment or dissatisfaction. The source of all dissatisfaction appears to stem from the ability to compare experiences and then infer that one's state is not ideal.

In the Tao Te Ching, this development of man from his primal state of consciousness called Tao is similarly expounded in this manner: "When the Tao is lost, there is goodness. When goodness is lost, there is morality...". Morality is the intellectual discernment between good and evil. There is a belief that one can achieve contentment by living "in the moment," which represents a way to stop the judgmental process of discriminating between good and bad. However, attempting to live in the moment is difficult because a person's attention is not only distracted by sensory stimuli but also psychological processes that conspire to make them think subconsciously or consciously. This thinking process is involved with memories; hence, the attempt to stay in the present is a ponderous one given that there is a subconscious struggle to break away from memories, especially unhappy ones. For this reason, specializations in this pursuit to live in the moment are found in various religious and mystical schools, manifested in forms of meditation and prayer. Various studies have shown prayer to promote well-being in religious people.

Practicing contentment as an attitude is another way for a person to obtain it in their lives. Practicing gratitude is another way to understand what contentment as an attitude is about. Seen in this light, contentment is not an achievement but an attitude that one can adopt at any time. The American philosopher Robert Bruce Raup wrote a book Complacency: The Foundation of Human Behavior (1925) in which he claimed that the human need for complacency (i.e. inner tranquility) was the hidden spring of human behavior. Raup made this the basis of his pedagogical theory, which he later used in his criticisms of the American education system of the 1930s. In the context of present-day society, the multidimensional leisure culture evinces the desire of man to return to his core state of contentment by letting go of his hectic outer activities.

=== Contentment and positive psychology ===
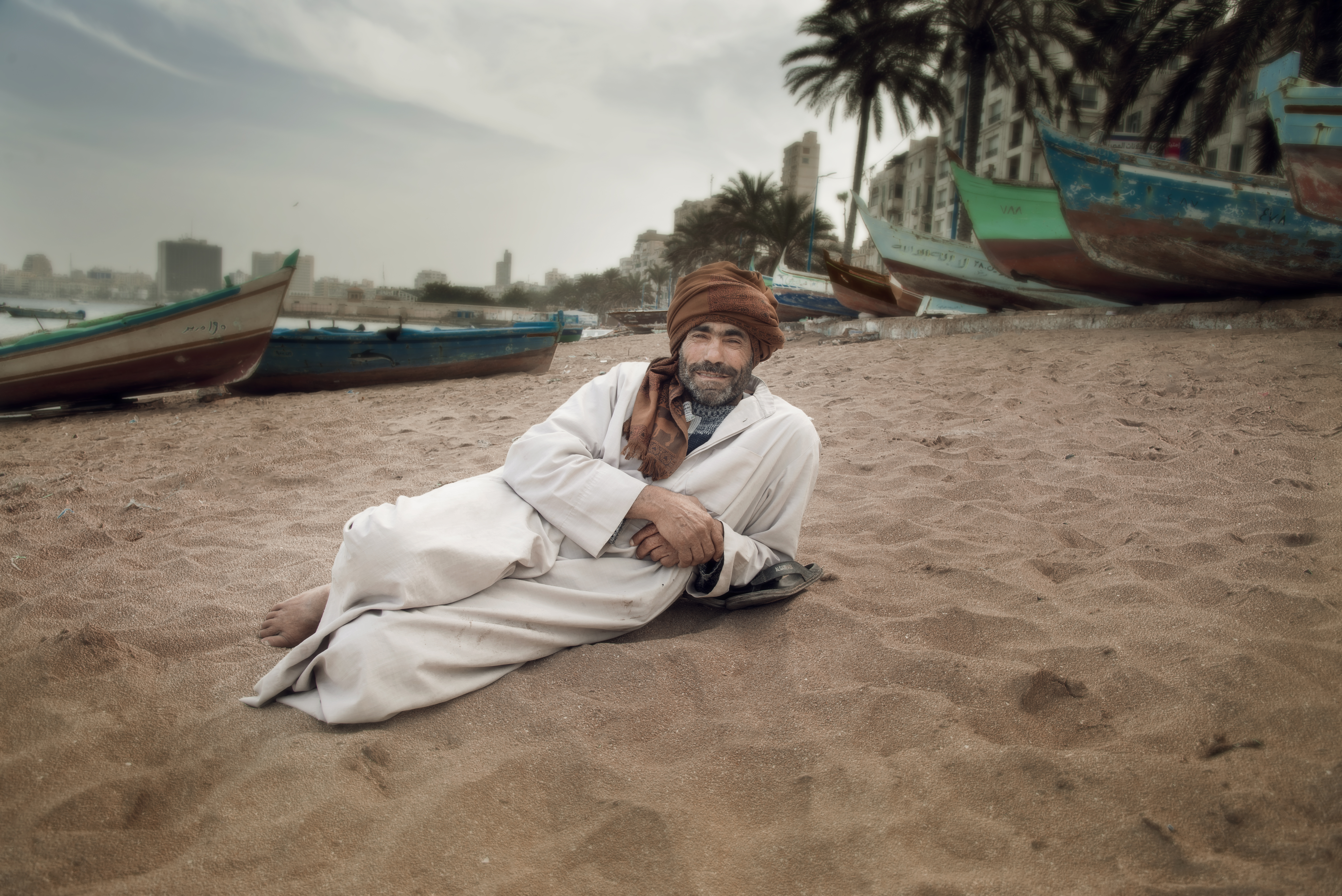
Content man on a beach in Alexandria, Egypt

In many ways, contentment can be closely associated with the concept of happiness and satisfaction. In positive psychology, social scientists study what might contribute to living a good life, or what would lead to people having increased positive mood and overall satisfaction with their life. Happiness, in positive psychology, is defined in a twofold manner, which in totality is referred to as subjective well-being. How much positive emotion (positive affect) as opposed to negative emotion (negative affect) a person has, and how one views one's life overall (global satisfaction) are the questions asked in positive psychology to determine happiness. Contentment is closely related to a person's level of satisfaction with his or her life (global satisfaction).

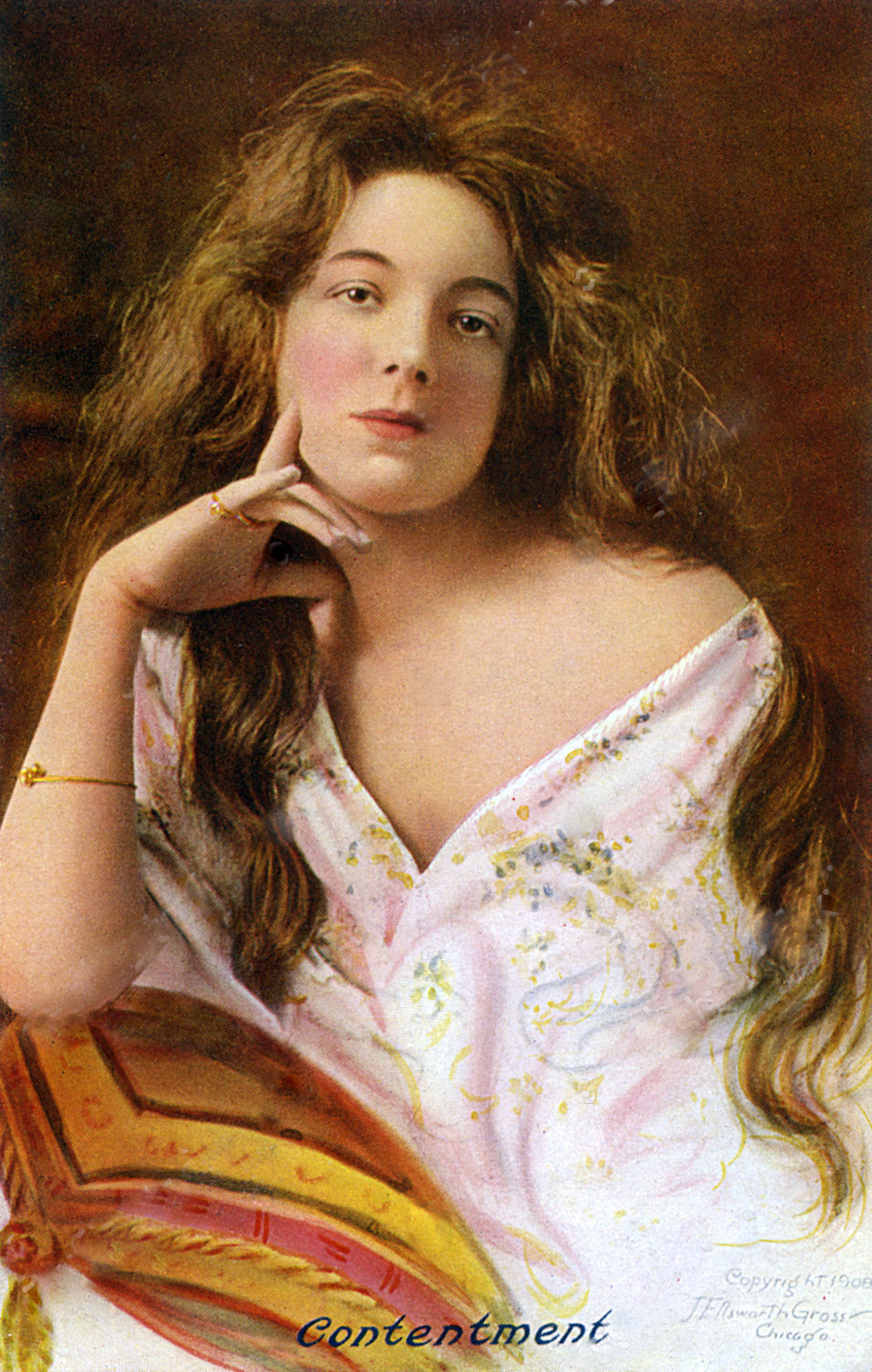
"Contentment", by J. Ellsworth Gross, 1908

In the 2014 book Lucky Go Happy : Make Happiness Happen!, Paul van der Merwe uses a chart to illustrate how being content for long periods of time, can yield more happiness than being ecstatic during a short period.

According to Hungarian poet Daniel Berzsenyi contentment can come not from wealth, but from mother nature and your loved ones. According to him, only a poor but carefree worker can be truly content, so he equates it with work-life balance and the feeling of settlement. In his poem of the same name, the state is personified as "Megelégedés".

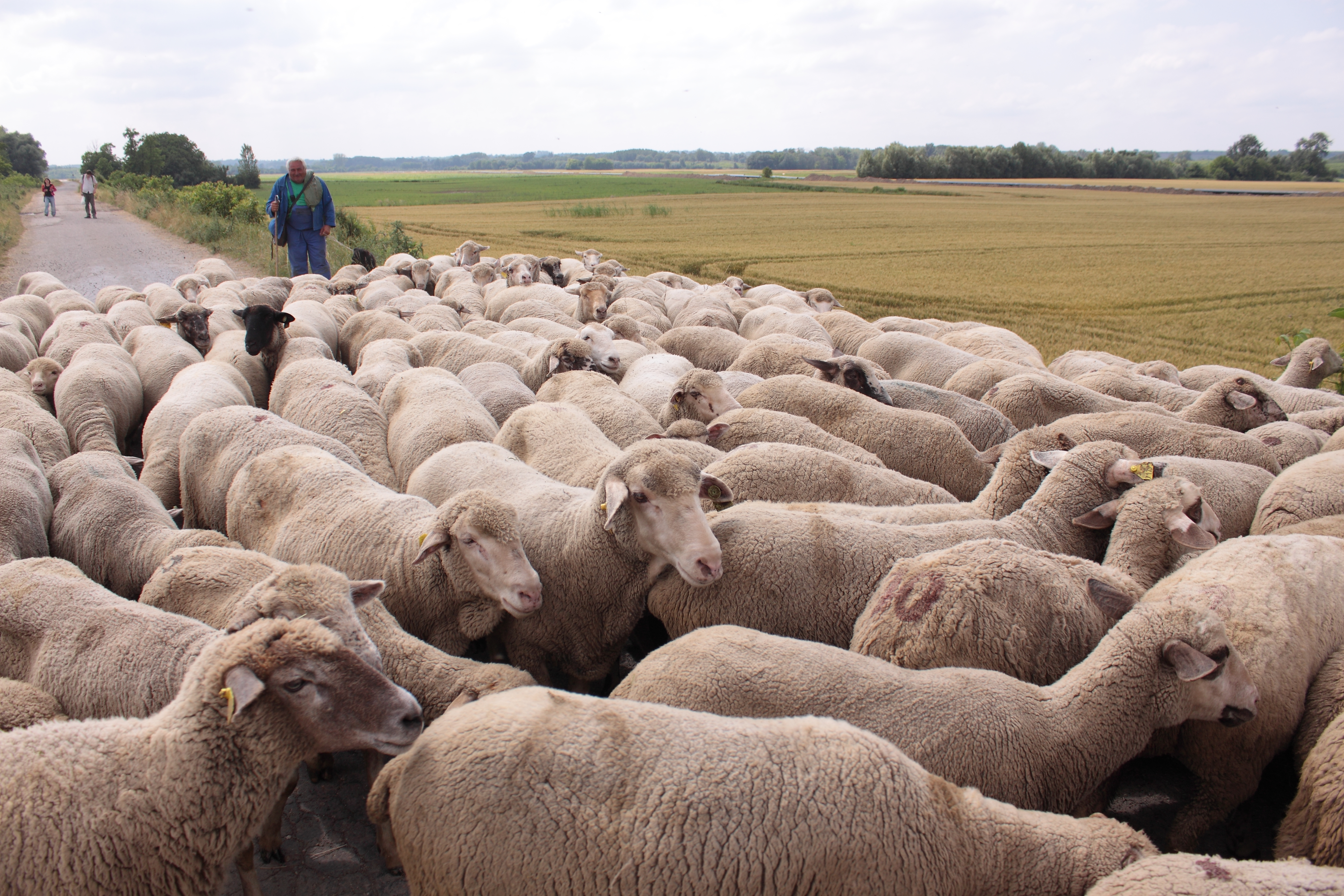
Berzsenyi idealizes the pastoral life where the Megelégedés lives.

Positive psychology studies what contributes to people being happy and to people flourishing, and focuses on constructive ways in which people function and adapt, as opposed to the general field of psychology which focuses more on what goes wrong or is pathological with human psychology. The role of positive psychology can have a great impact on the many aspects of one's life. According to positive psychology, human beings adapt to circumstances in life, and circumstances do not hold a long lasting effect on one's mood.

=== Variables that contribute to happiness in research ===
==== Satisficer vs. maximizer ====
These are two concepts that define the ways in which people make choices. A satisficer is a person who will make a decision once their criteria are met, and a maximizer, on the other hand, will not make a decision until every possible option is explored.

==== Genes ====
There is evidence suggesting that there is a relationship between contentment and genes. In a study done by Weiss et al. (2008) they found that genetics can be a factor in a person's overall well-being. More specifically, genes seem to be within the layer of factors that contribute to well-being and happiness. The study suggested that genes have a positive relationship between personality traits and happiness traits, similar to the relationship of comorbidity in psychopathy.

In a more recent study by Matsunaga et al. (2018), certain gene receptors have been found to play a role in the perception of one's happiness as they directly impact emotional processing and other physiological processes such as appetite regulation, evaluation of self and others, and memory.

==== Personality ====
Through factor analysis, personality can be narrowed down according to the five factor model, which holds that there are five aspects of heritable personality traits: openness to experience, conscientiousness, extraversion, agreeableness, and neuroticism. Research has shown that personality is 50% heritable, but not always. One's level or perception of happiness, or one's subjective well-being, has shown to be related to personality traits. There are two aspects of personality which are related to happiness. There is a strong relationship between extraversion and happiness, in that the more extraverted a person is (or behaves) the more happy he/she will likely be. The other aspect of personality which has a strong relationship to happiness is the genetic predisposition to neuroticism. The more neurotic (emotionally unstable) a person is, the more likely he/she is to be unhappy.

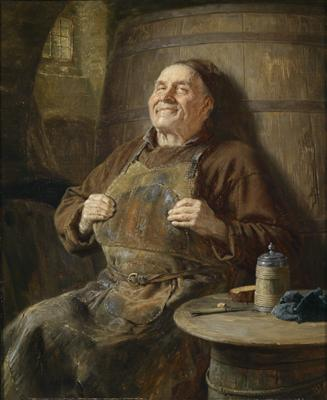
Peace and contentment Eduard von Grützner (1897)

In a study concerning the development of the positive emotion assessment, also known as PEACE, on contentment it was found that higher levels of contentment were correlated with low levels of need for materialism and greed.

==== Goal pursuits ====
Reaching goals that are important to oneself and that are in alignment with one's personality can contribute to feelings of confidence and mastery. It is important to establish goals that are neither too easy or too hard, but that are optimally challenging. Investing energy in avoiding goals will contribute to diminishing happiness, as well as deter one from reaching one's goals, which can be quite intuitive to understand.

==== Money ====
Many people strongly associate money with happiness, and they believe that being rich will contribute greatly to making them happier, and the American society reflects this growing materialism. Although wealth is associated with some positive outcomes, i.e. lighter prison sentences for the same crime, better health, and lower infant mortality, and can act as a buffer in certain instances, as mentioned previously, the overall relationship between money and happiness is marginal.

However, beyond a low threshold where the basic needs are met, money has a very small impact on happiness. There is also the concept of the diminishing marginal utility of income (DMUI), which is that money has no effect on happiness once a certain income level has been reached, and which represents wealth and happiness as having a curvilinear relationship. This common misconception among society regarding the relationship between money and happiness guides people down the path of chasing success opposed to a life of contentment and happiness from other sources.

Indeed, when one has met his basic needs and have more to spare, it is time to spend or give some to experience happiness. This is because happiness is really a state of in-and-out flow of one's energy. Using or giving money is an expression of out-flowing of one's life-state. Attempt to just hoard more and more in the belief that it brings more happiness can lead to the opposite result if only because the means – that is the pursuit of money for happiness – has unwittingly become the ends.

==== Leisure (also Leisure satisfaction) ====
The concept of work-life balance is now well-accepted. The 'life' aspect of this 'work-life' concept includes activities devoted to one's personal life which sometimes calls for the kind of commitment and effort no less than that demanded from one's work-life. In some societies, this 'life' aspect might include looking after the elderly and infirm, sending children to and from schools, preparing the meals, cleaning the house and doing the laundry. They are as much work as the work life, and in the midst of all these, the need for leisure activities is simply an alien concept. Leisure as a culture is not a universal societal value although the younger generation in developed or near-developed societies seems more inclined toward it. Overseas trips, lounging in a cafe with friends, attending concerts, relaxing in a spa, karaoke-ing and similar activities after office hours are now prevalent among that generation. In fact, over the last 15 years, the market has seen a tremendous surge in demand for such leisure services. In his book "In the Era of Human Capital", Richard Crawford charted the exponential growth of the Business & Leisure sector in the post-industrial society. This trend might look like an offshoot of a more affluent society; however, the need for leisure is intrinsic in humans and only through the demands of modern economic life – run as it were by the clock, timetables, deadlines and schedules – did this need fade into the background.

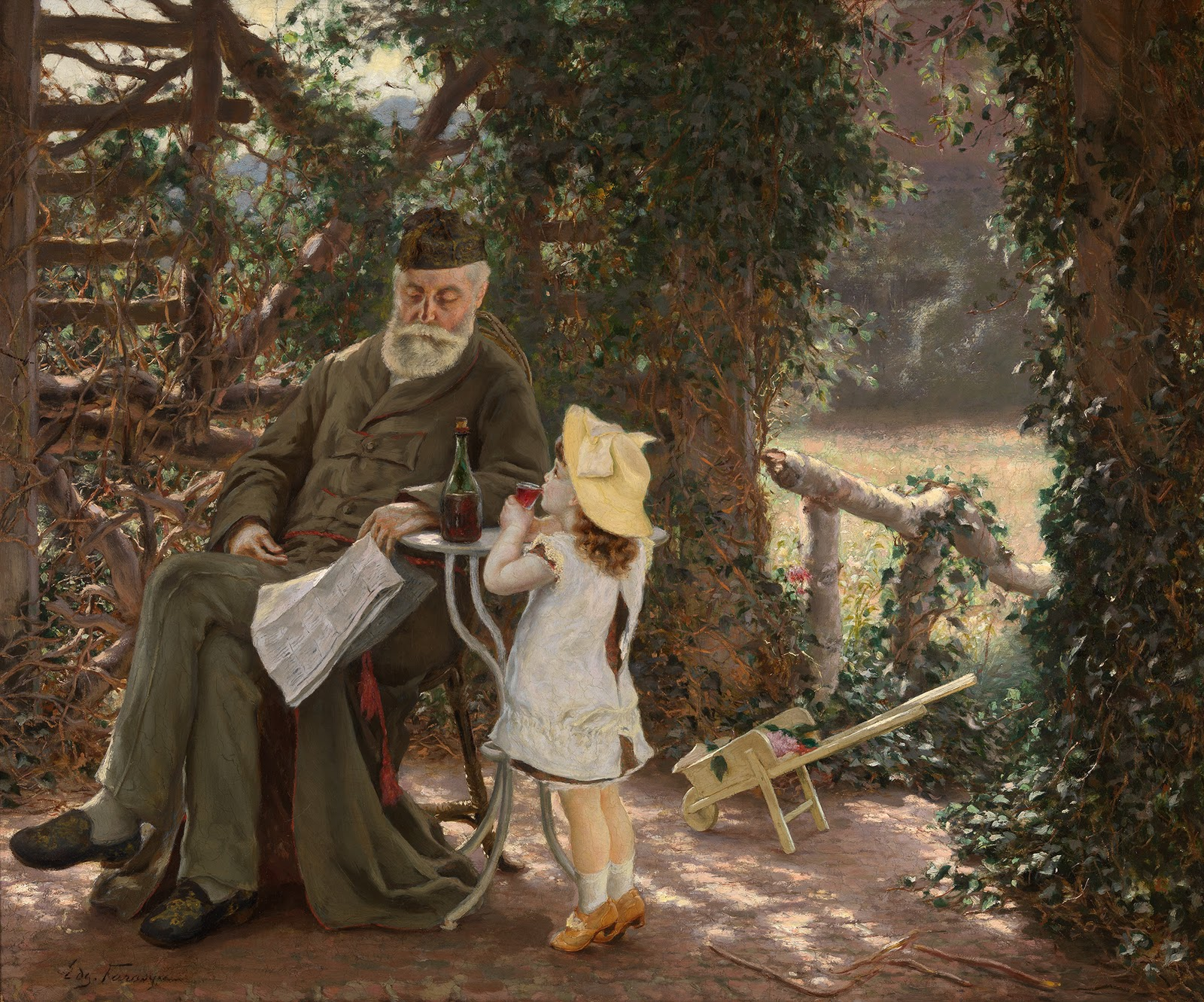
Human Contentments (20th century), a painting by Edgard Farasyn

Humans' need for leisure is intrinsic because that is the state they were born with, or rather, that is the state of life in the natural world. Leisure implies that one is not pressured by others or oneself to deliver a certain result but that life is lived to enjoy the simple pleasures of exploring the world that one is born into.

This happy state of life is that generally experienced by the pre-school child and is gradually lost when duties and responsibilities of school life and subsequently the adult work-life enter into the picture.

Not all societies have embraced the leisure culture whether through certain public policies like having a universal welfare system, and psychological and financial preparedness on the part of individuals for retirement wherein leisure is the salient feature. This even applies to developed nations. For example, the US has a "retirement crisis" in which a large percentage of Americans do not have sufficient savings for retirement.

Economic productivity being often if not always equated with work, the culture of leisure is seldom recognized as a major contributor to a growing business sector. For this reason, many societies do not have in place an infrastructure that strongly supports the leisure culture – such as represented by a universal social welfare system, a wealth of products, services and amenities for retirees. Such societies even if they were to become more affluent may continue to find happiness elusive even for retirees. Leisure is intrinsically sought after as a way to release the tensions of work-life. It is often used to indulge in activities meant to reduce stress, such as surfing the Internet, watching movies or playing games. Leisure also allows people – without the need of any modern gadgets – to re-connect with family and friends and experience the happiness arising from interactions such as chatting over a drink or meal.

==== Health ====
Historically, major Eastern mystical teachings on human development, like those from India and China, do not make a separation between the spiritual and physical. Happiness or contentment was never viewed as an isolated state from physical health. Physical health-enhancing practices such as Hatha yoga and qigong – and their respective herbalism known as Ayurveda and TCM (traditional Chinese medicine) – were consonant with and fully integrated into those mystical teachings in the implicit belief that the attainment of the ideal state of consciousness requires a healthy body as a launchpad or basis even. Personal development and health in these systems are understood more as a holistic development of the various aspects of the multidimensional human being.

The concept of body and mind interplay (including relationship factor) now known as psychosomatic medicine has always been present in these "mystical teachings", particularly in TCM. An unhappy, angry patient may be told by a TCM physician that there is a lot of trapped heat in their internal organs and then treated accordingly with herbs or acupuncture. At times, if the TCM physician is a qigong practitioner, they may even recommend some qigong exercises for the patient to practice.

However, given the lack of scientific basis for their effectiveness, holistic health maintenance practices may not always be adequate, reliable, or safe. Consulting a qualified doctor is the best way to maintain good health.

Outer success and material possession are considered secondary when health is compromised. One cannot be happy or contented when the body is broken, although there are rare, exceptional individuals who are able to rise above their physical predicament. However, for the vast majority having a good knowledge and an effective protocol for personal health is thought to be critical to happiness not just to oneself but also to one's family and friends.

==== Universal social welfare ====
Contentment has also been studied as a cultural or political phenomenon. The Nordic nations, which have repeatedly appeared near the top in Happiness Index surveys like World Happiness Report – and most likely correlated economic performance as well – contend that higher rates of happiness are rooted in their welfare system, the "Nordic model", which not only fulfills the healthcare, social and other essential needs of their people but also is proposed to provide a high sense of security.

Other research indicates a substantial portion of Scandinavians exaggerate their sense of happiness or contentment when asked informally or in surveys, due to social prohibitions against expressing negativity or unhappiness.

The region's rates of alcohol abuse, among the highest in Europe, have also been cited as an indication that the positive social effects attributed to the Nordic model are exaggerated.

== Judaism ==
Some of the earliest references to the state of contentment are found in the reference to the midah (personal attribute) of Samayach B'Chelko (in Hebrew שמח בחלקו). The expression comes from the word samayach (root Sin-Mem-Chet in Hebrew - ש.מ.ח) meaning "happiness, joy or contentment", and chelko (root Chet-Lamed-Kuf in Hebrew - ח.ל.ק) meaning "portion, lot, or piece", and combined mean contentment with one's lot in life. The attribute is referred to in the Mishnahic source which says, "Ben Zoma said: Who is rich? Those who are happy with their portion."

The origins of contentment in Jewish culture reflect an even older thinking reflected in the Book of Proverbs which says: "A joyful heart makes a cheerful face; A sad heart makes a despondent mood. All the days of a poor person are wretched, but contentment is a feast without end."

The issue of contentment remained in Jewish thinking during the Middle Ages as evident for example in the writings of Solomon Ibn Gabirol, an eleventh-century Spanish poet-philosopher who taught:

Who seeks more than he needs, hinders himself from enjoying what he has. Seek what you need and give up what you need not. For in giving up what you don't need, you'll learn what you really do need.

== Christianity ==
In the Old Testament, there is an account that man's fall from his paradisal state was caused by man eating the forbidden fruit from the Tree of the Knowledge of Good and Evil. Man's eyes were opened to know the distinction between good and evil (Genesis 3). In other words, when man becomes intellectually developed to distinguish between good and evil, he realizes there is a gap between what he considers good or ideal and what he is experiencing. The perception of this disparity is what creates psychological and physiological tension.

In the New Testament, during his ministry, Christ himself gives an inventory of these "satisfactions", called beatitudes: "Blessed are the poor in spirit, for the Kingdom of Heaven is theirs", "Blessed are the hungry and thirsty for righteousness, for they will be satisfied "," happy the pure in heart, for they will see God ". Many other people in the Bible also spoke about contentment:

"And the soldiers likewise demanded of him, saying, And what shall we do? And he said unto them, Do violence to no man, neither accuse any falsely; and be content with your wages."

— John the Baptist - Luke 3:14

"If they obey and serve him, they shall spend their days in prosperity, and their years in pleasures."

— Elihu - Job 36:11

Not that I speak in respect of want: for I have learned, in whatsoever state I am, therewith to be content. I know both how to be abased, and I know how to abound: every where and in all things I am instructed both to be full and to be hungry, both to abound and to suffer need. I can do all things through Christ which strengtheneth me.

— Paul the Apostle - Philippians 4:11-13

Jesus Christ defended love as the fundamental element for achieving harmony on all levels, including the level of individual happiness. True gratitude comes from accepting Christ and believing that in Him you will have everything you need.

Be content (Luke 10:7). The 70 disciples were told not to seek better accommodations; they were to stay in the home that first received them.

The vision of Christianity considers that in life it is essential to be happy and satisfied.

== Islam ==
There are many times when Contentment is cited by the Quran as a (mainly) positive attribute. For example, the Quran states:

Truly, it is in the remembrance of God that hearts can find contentment

— Quran - 13:28

In a well known Hadith (saying of Muhammad) Muhammad said:

If the son of Adam (the human being) were given a valley full of riches, he would love to have a second one; and if he were given the second one, he would love to have a third, for nothing satisfies the belly of Adam's son except dust (of the grave). And Allah forgives he who repents (turns) to Him.

— Saheeh Bukhari-Vol 8:book76

== Dharmic (Indic) religions ==
In Yoga (Yoga Sutras of Patanjali), movement or positions, breathing practices, and concentration, as well as the yamas and niyamas, can contribute to a physical state of contentment (santosha).

=== Buddhism ===
Contentment, known as santutthi in Pāli, is freedom from anxiety, wanting, or craving. It is an important virtue that was mentioned in many important Buddhist scriptures like Metta Sutta, Mangala Sutta etc. In the verse 204 of Dhammapada, contentment is mentioned as the greatest wealth. In the "Discourse on the Traditions of the Noble Ones" from Anguttara Nikāya, Lord Buddha mentioned that the Noble Ones are contented with old robes, old almsfood and old lodging. "Having cast away all deeds, Who could obstruct him? Like an ornament of finest gold, Who is fit to find fault with him?"

=== Sikhism ===
Contentment (or Sabar or Santokh) is an important aspect in Sikh life and is known as attainment of First Treasure. Sikhism categorizes Contentment into two forms: Contentment (Santokh) and True Contentment (Satt Santokh/Sabar). Contentment can be broken, turning souls greedy for the temporal world, but True Contentment is never broken and such a soul is eligible for the Supreme State. The soul having contentment is called Saabari or Santokhi.

== See also ==
- Comfort – Sense of physical or psychological ease
- Deferred gratification – Resistance of an immediate reward in return for a greater reward later
- Gratification – Pleasurable emotional reaction of happiness
- Happiness – Positive emotional state
- Pleasure – Experience that feels good or is enjoyable

== See also ==
- 5 Ways To Feel Content With Your Life Right Now
- Borowitz, Eugene B. & Weinman Schwartz, Frances, The Jewish Moral Virtues, Jewish Publication Society, 1999
- Meir Leibush (Malbim), Rabbi, translated by Charles Wengrov and Avivah Gottlieb Zornberg, Malbim on Mishley: The Book of Proverbs in Hebrew & English, Feldheim, 2001
- Fohrman, David & Kasnett, Nesanel, Rabbis, editors, Babylonian Talmud Volume 3, Shabbat 32a, Volume I, ArtScroll / Mesorah, 1999
- Ануашвили. Удовольствие и удовлетворение on YouTube
