= German General Social Survey =

National data generation program in Germany

The German General Social Survey (ALLBUS/GGSS - Die Allgemeine Bevölkerungsumfrage der Sozialwissenschaften) is a national data generation program in Germany, which is similar to the American General Social Survey (GSS). Its mission is to collect and disseminate high quality statistical surveys on attitudes, behavior, and social structure in Germany.

== Funding and Organizational Background ==
With the foundation of GESIS – Leibniz Institute for the Social Sciences (formerly: "German Social Sciences Infrastructure Services" (Gesellschaft sozialwissenschaftlicher Infrastruktureinrichtungen)) in 1986, ALLBUS/GGSS has been included into the state-federal funding of this grouping. It is institutionalized as a joint-venture of GESIS at Mannheim (formerly: Centre for Survey Research and Methodology (ZUMA - Zentrum für Umfragen, Methoden und Analysen)) and GESIS at Cologne (formerly: Central Archive for Empirical Social Research (ZA - Zentralarchiv für Empirische Sozialforschung)). Since 2010 ALLBUS is an officially accredited Research Data Center of The German Data Forum (RatSWD).

== The Surveys ==
Standardly, the representative cross-sectional studies are conducted biennially since 1980. A large part of the items included consists of replications, while others are specifically varied according to particular topics.

Until 1990, the individual surveys were conducted using a random sample of ca. 3000 German citizens from the old Federal Republic of Germany and West Berlin who were residing in private households and were at least 18 years old at the time of the interview. In 1991 the universe sampled was extended to cover the former East Germany, and foreign residents are included in the samples.

Since 1986, the German part of the International Social Survey Programme (ISSP) is regularly conducted as part of the ALLBUS/GGSS survey. As in GSS both national surveys can be analysed in a common data set.

=== Cumulative Data File ===
The cumulative ALLBUS/GGSS 1980-2010 comprises opinion poll data from all of the 18 currently available ALLBUS/GGSS surveys, with a total of 54,243 respondents. It comprises all items that have been surveyed at least two times within the regular ALLBUS/GGSS program (replications).

=== Topical Modules in the ALLBUS/GGSS program ===
- Assessments of economic situations
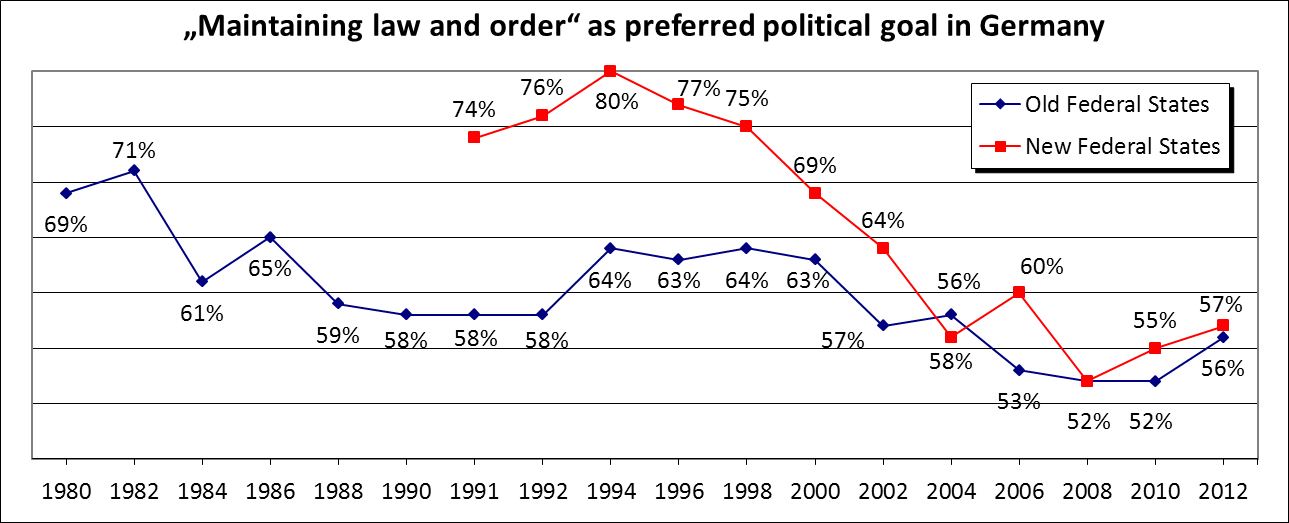
  Exemplary analysis of ALLBUS data
- Political attitudes and political participation
- Attitudes relating to the process of German unification
- Attitudes towards social inequality and the welfare state
- Confidence in public institutions and organizations
- Pride in being a German
- Attitudes towards migrants and minorities
- Attachment to various political regions
- Family and child raising
- Attitudes towards abortion
- Questions on health
- Importance of life aspects and job characteristics
- Free time activities
- Use of media
- Religiousness, cosmology and church attachment
- Environmental concerns and pollution
- Attitudes towards administration
- Anomia and fear of crime
- Deviant behavior and sanctioning
- ALLBUS-Demography (demographics)
- Details about the interview and the interviewer
- Weights and indices.

== See also ==
Besides, there is another major German data generation program for the collection of panel data called the Socio-Economic Panel (SOEP). This is similar to the American Panel Study of Income Dynamics (PSID).

== Literature ==
- Richard Alba, Peter Schmidt, and Martina Wasmer (eds.): Germans or Foreigners? Attitudes Towards Ethnic Minorities in Post-Reunification Germany. Palgrave Macmillan, New York and Houndmills 2003. ISBN 1-4039-6378-9
- James Allen Davis, Peter Ph. Mohler, and Tom W. Smith: Nationwide General Social Surveys. In: Ingwer Borg and Peter Ph. Mohler (eds.): Trends and Perspectives in Empirical Social Research. Walter de Gruyter, Berlin and New York 1994: 17–25. ISBN 3-11-014311-9
- Tom W. Smith, Jibum Kim, Achim Koch and Alison Park: Social-Science Research and the General Social Surveys. In: ZUMA-Nachrichten. Nr. 56, 2005: 68–77. ISSN 0944-1670
- Michael Terwey: ALLBUS: A German General Social Survey. In: Schmollers Jahrbuch. Zeitschrift für Wirtschafts- und Sozialwissenschaften. Journal of Applied Social Science Studies. Nr. 120, 2000: 151–158. ISSN 0342-1783
- Michael Terwey and Horst Baumann (eds.): Variable Report ALLBUS / German General Social Survey Cumulation 1980-2010. ZA-No. 4576. Cologne: GESIS. GESIS - Variable Reports; No. 2013/2
- Michael Terwey, Horst Baumann and Michael Blohm: Forschungsdatenzentrum ALLBUS Jahresbericht 2010, Berichtszeitraum 01.01.2010-31.12.2010. GESIS-Technical Reports 2011/03, Bonn: GESIS - Leibniz-Institut für Sozialwissenschaften 2011. PDF
