= NORC at the University of Chicago =

Research center

- Formation: 1941
- Type: Private, nonprofit organization
- Headquarters: Chicago, Illinois, U.S.
- Parent organization: University of Chicago
- Website: www.norc.org
- Formerly called: National Opinion Research Center

NORC at the University of Chicago, originally the National Opinion Research Center, is an independent non-profit research institute affiliated with the University of Chicago, a private university in Chicago, Illinois, United States.

Established in 1941, its corporate headquarters is located in downtown Chicago, with offices in several other locations throughout the United States. Organized as an independent corporation, more than half its board comes from faculty and administration of the University of Chicago. It also jointly staffs some of the university's academic research centers.

In 2026 the NORC was awarded the BBVA Foundation Frontiers of Knowledge Award for 2025 in the category of "Social Sciences".

== History ==
The organization was founded by researcher Harry Field in 1941 as the "National Opinion Research Center", with financial support from department-store heir and newspaper owner Marshall Field III (no relation) and the University of Denver, where it was located. The center moved to the University of Chicago in 1947. Since its founding, NORC at the University of Chicago has conducted numerous social research projects involving opinion surveys, panel surveys, and marketing research. It also has conducted other data collection efforts for government agencies, nonprofit agencies, and corporations.

Data from surveys are also often analyzed in a wide range of social sciences, especially sociology. NORC is best known for its large, national surveys, but has also conducted qualitative and quantitative analyses, longitudinal analyses, methodological studies, and international projects.

=== Clients ===
NORC clients have included:

- American Bar Association - Women of Color in Law Firms Survey and Focus Groups
- Bill and Melinda Gates Foundation – Gates Millennium Scholars Tracking and Longitudinal Study, Washington State Achievers Program
- Centers for Disease Control and Prevention (CDC) – National Immunization Survey (NIS), National Flu Survey
- CNN – Florida Ballot Project
- Federal Reserve Board – Survey of Consumer Finances
- NASA – Community Reactions to Sonic Booms, Effects of Sonic Boom on People
- New York Times – Florida Ballot Project
- Tribune Company – Florida Ballot Project
- U.S. Census Bureau – Integrated Communications Program (ICP) Evaluation
- U.S. Department of Defense – Camp Lejeune Environmental Health Survey
- U.S. Department of Education – Survey of Earned Doctorates
- U.S. Department of Energy – Commercial Buildings Energy Consumption Survey
- U.S. Department of Health and Human Services – National Survey of Children's Health, National Survey of Early Care and Education (NSECE)
- U.S. Department of Labor Bureau of Labor Statistics – National Longitudinal Survey of Youth
- Wall Street Journal – Florida Ballot Project
- World Bank – Survey Data Collection for Impact Evaluation

=== Notable projects ===
- AP Votecast, 2018–2024: A survey system of voters and non-voters developed with the Associated Press that replaced AP's exit polls. The system debuted in 2018.
- Medicare Current Beneficiary Survey 1991–present: Examines the social and health status of Medicare beneficiaries on behalf of the Centers for Medicare & Medicaid Services
- National Survey of Children's Health, 2003–present: Examines the physical and emotional health of children ages 0–17 years of age. Funded by U.S. Department of Health and Human Services.
- National Immunization Survey (NIS), 1994–present: Provides the public with important statistics about childhood immunization and related health matters. Funded by the CDC.
- Survey of Consumer Finances (SCF), 1992–present: Collects information about household financial characteristics and behavior. In the United States, it is thought to be the best source of information about family finances. Approximately 4,500 subjects participate in the survey. Funded by the Federal Reserve Board.
- General Social Survey (GSS), 1972–present: Monitors social change and the complexity of American society and has participated in the cross-national survey International Social Survey Programme (ISSP) since 1985. This survey plays an important role in American sociology. After the U.S. Census, it is the second most frequently analyzed source of information for the social sciences in the United States. Funded by the Sociology Program of the National Science Foundation.
- National Longitudinal Survey of Youth (NLSY), 1966–present: Asks questions about economic, social, and academic experiences of the subjects. The survey also researches issues related to youth entry into the work force. Funded by the Bureau of Labor Statistics, U.S. Department of Labor.
- 2012 NORC Presidential Election Study, September–November 2012: Nonpartisan study of public opinion on candidate favorability, perception of the economy, issue knowledge, and healthcare before and after the presidential election. Funded by NORC at the University of Chicago.
- Making Connections Survey (MCS), 2002–2011: Neighborhood-based, longitudinal and cross-sectional surveying residents in ten low-income communities across the United States. It serves as an evaluation of a larger AECF-supported initiative and was designed to collect data measuring how neighborhood change affects the well-being of children. The final survey dataset includes responses from roughly 28,000 interviews at three points in time. Funded by the Annie E. Casey Foundation.
- National Survey of Children with Special Health Care Needs (NS-CSHCN), 2002–2010: The primary goals of this survey are to assess the prevalence and impact of special health care needs among children in the U.S., and to evaluate change over time. Funded by the Maternal and Child Health Bureau, Health Resources & Services Administration, U.S. Department of Health and Human Services.
- Florida Ballot Project, February–May 2001: Re-examined the approximately 180,000 uncounted ballots in the 2000 U.S. Presidential Election. Funded by The New York Times, The Washington Post, Wall Street Journal, CNN, Tribune Company, Palm Beach Post, St. Petersburg Times, and Associated Press. NORC was featured in the 2003 documentary film Orwell Rolls in His Grave.
- Sonic Boom Tests Reactions, 1961–1962: Public opinion measurement for the infamous sonic boom tests over Oklahoma City, which were intended to measure the impact of supersonic transports (SSTs) over populated areas. Funded by NASA.

=== Services ===
- AmeriSpeak, October 2014–present: A representative cross-section of U.S households for the scientific study of public opinion. AmeriSpeak panelists take part in online and telephone surveys regarding current events, social and political trends, health care, government policies and programs, and consumer products and trends. Funded by NORC at the University of Chicago.
- AmplifyAAPI, 2023–present: NORC’s first representative survey panel focusing on Asian Americans, Native Hawaiians, and Pacific Islanders. It is funded by NORC with support from AARP and initial funders include The Rockefeller Foundation.

=== Controversies ===
In October 2023, United States Department of Labor and NORC reached a conciliation agreement to resolve alleged hiring discrimination against Asian applicants for positions as coronavirus contact tracers between May 2020 to August 2021. NORC agreed to pay $95,000 in back wages and interest to 107 Asian applicants and also review its hiring policies, procedures, and trainings so they are free from discrimination in accordance to Executive Order 11246.
