= Quality of life =

Degree of individual well-being

Quality of life (QOL) is defined by the World Health Organization as "an individual's perception of their position in life in the context of the culture and value systems in which they live and in relation to their goals, expectations, standards and concerns".

Standard indicators of the quality of life include wealth, employment, the environment, physical and mental health, education, recreation and leisure time, social belonging, safety, security and freedom. QOL has a wide range of contexts, including the fields of international development, healthcare, politics and employment. Health related QOL (HRQOL) is an evaluation of QOL and its relationship with health.

== Engaged theory ==
One approach, called the engaged theory, outlined in the journal of Applied Research in the Quality of Life, posits four domains in assessing quality of life: ecology, economics, politics and culture. In the domain of culture, for example, it includes the following subdomains of quality of life:

- Beliefs and ideas
- Creativity and recreation
- Enquiry and learning
- Gender and generations
- Identity and engagement
- Memory and projection
- Well-being and health

Under this conception, other frequently related concepts include freedom, human rights, and happiness. However, since happiness is subjective and difficult to measure, other measures are generally given priority. It has also been shown that happiness, as much as it can be measured, is not identical to comfort that results from increasing income. As a result, the standard of living should not be taken to be a measure of happiness. Also, sometimes considered related is the concept of human security, though the latter may be considered at a more basic level and for all people.

== Quantitative measurement ==
Unlike per capita GDP or standard of living, both of which can be measured in financial terms, it is harder to make objective or long-term measurements of the quality of life experienced by nations or other groups of people. Quality of life can be estimated with opinion polls. Researchers have begun in recent times to distinguish two aspects of personal well-being: Emotional well-being, in which respondents are asked about the quality of their everyday emotional experiences – the frequency and intensity of their experiences of, for example, joy, stress, sadness, anger and affection – and life evaluation, in which respondents are asked to think about their life in general and evaluate it against a scale. Such and other systems and scales of measurement have been in use for some time. Research has attempted to examine the relationship between quality of life and productivity.

There are many different methods of measuring quality of life in terms of health care, wealth, and materialistic goods. However, it is much more difficult to measure meaningful expression of one's desires. One way to do so is to evaluate the extent to which individuals have fulfilled their own ideals. Quality of life can be subjective.

According to ecological economist Robert Costanza:

While Quality of Life (QOL) has long been an explicit or implicit policy goal, adequate definition and measurement have been elusive. Diverse "objective" and "subjective" indicators across a range of disciplines and scales, and recent work on subjective well-being (SWB) surveys and the psychology of happiness have spurred renewed interest.

One widely used quantitative tool is the WHOQOL-BREF, a 26-item questionnaire developed by the World Health Organization that assesses quality of life across four domains — physical, psychological, social, and environmental — and has been translated into dozens of languages for use in both clinical practice and research. However, a 2026 study analysing 21 country versions of the questionnaire found substantial discrepancies between them, including inconsistent measurement timeframes, missing instructions, and translation errors severe enough that responses to certain items could not be meaningfully compared across countries.

=== Human Development Index ===
Perhaps the most commonly used international measure of development is the Human Development Index (HDI), which combines measures of life expectancy, education, and standard of living, in an attempt to quantify the options available to individuals within a given society. The HDI is used by the United Nations Development Programme in their Human Development Report. However, since 2010, The Human Development Report introduced an Inequality-adjusted Human Development Index (IHDI). While the original HDI remains useful, it stated that "the IHDI is the actual level of human development (accounting for inequality), while the original HDI can be viewed as an index of 'potential' human development (or the maximum level of HDI) that could be achieved if there was no inequality."

=== World Happiness Report ===
Map showing happiness of countries by their score according to the 2023 World Happiness Report

The World Happiness Report is a landmark survey on the state of global happiness. It ranks 156 countries by their happiness levels, reflecting growing global interest in using happiness and substantial well-being as an indicator of the quality of human development. Its growing purpose has allowed governments, communities and organizations to use appropriate data to record happiness in order to enable policies to provide better lives. The reports review the state of happiness in the world today and show how the science of happiness explains personal and national variations in happiness.

Developed once again by the United Nations and published recently, along with the HDI, this report combines both objective and subjective measures to rank countries by happiness. It uses surveys from Gallup, real GDP per capita, healthy life expectancy, having someone to count on, perceived freedom to make life choices, freedom from corruption, and generosity to derive the final score. Happiness is already recognized as an important concept in global public policy. The World Happiness Report indicates that some regions have, in recent years, been experiencing progressive inequality of happiness.

=== Other measures ===
The Physical Quality of Life Index (PQLI) is a measure developed by sociologist M. D. Morris in the 1970s, based on basic literacy, infant mortality, and life expectancy. Although not as complex as other measures, and now essentially replaced by the Human Development Index, the PQLI is notable for Morris's attempt to show a "less fatalistic pessimistic picture" by focusing on three areas where global quality of life was generally improving at the time, while ignoring gross national product and other possible indicators that were not improving.

The Happy Planet Index, introduced in 2006, is unique among quality of life measures in that, in addition to standard determinants of well-being, it uses each country's ecological footprint as an indicator. As a result, European and North American nations do not dominate this measure. The 2012 list is instead topped by Costa Rica, Vietnam and Colombia.

In 2010, Gallup researchers trying to find the world's happiest countries found Denmark to be at the top of the list. For the period 2014–2016, Norway surpasses Denmark to be at the top of the list.

A 2010 study by two Princeton University professors looked at 1,000 randomly selected U.S. residents over an extended period. It concludes that their life evaluations – that is, their considered evaluations of their life against a stated scale of one to ten – rise steadily with income. On the other hand, their reported quality of emotional daily experiences (their reported experiences of joy, affection, stress, sadness, or anger) levels off after a certain income level (approximately $75,000 per year in 2010); income above $75,000 does not lead to more experiences of happiness nor to further relief of unhappiness or stress. Below this income level, respondents reported decreasing happiness and increasing sadness and stress, implying the pain of life's misfortunes, including disease, divorce, and being alone, is exacerbated by poverty.

Gross national happiness and other subjective measures of happiness are being used by the governments of Bhutan and the United Kingdom. The World Happiness report, issued by Columbia University is a meta-analysis of happiness globally and provides an overview of countries and grassroots activists using GNH. The OECD issued a guide for the use of subjective well-being metrics in 2013. In the U.S., cities and communities are using a GNH metric at a grassroots level.

The Social Progress Index measures the extent to which countries provide for the social and environmental needs of their citizens. Fifty-two indicators in the areas of basic human needs, foundations of wellbeing, and opportunity show the relative performance of nations. The index uses outcome measures when there is sufficient data available or the closest possible proxies.

Day-Reconstruction Method was another way of measuring happiness, in which researchers asked their subjects to recall various things they did on the previous day and describe their mood during each activity. Being simple and approachable, this method required memory and the experiments have confirmed that the answers that people give are similar to those who repeatedly recalled each subject. The method eventually declined as it called for more effort and thoughtful responses, which often included interpretations and outcomes that do not occur to people who are asked to record every action in their daily lives.

The Digital Quality of Life Index - a yearly study on digital well-being across 121 countries created by Surfshark. It indexes each country according to five pillars that impact a population's digital quality of life: internet affordability, internet quality, electronic infrastructure, electronic security, and electronic government.

=== Livability ===
The Economist Intelligence Unit awarded Vienna the most livable city in 2019 Global Liveability Ranking.

The term quality of life is also used by politicians and economists to measure the livability of a given city or nation. Two widely known measures of livability are the Economist Intelligence Unit's Where-to-be-born Index and Mercer's Quality of Living Reports. These two measures calculate the livability of countries and cities around the world, respectively, through a combination of subjective life-satisfaction surveys and objective determinants of quality of life such as divorce rates, safety, and infrastructure. Such measures relate more broadly to the population of a city, state, or country, not to individual quality of life. Livability has a long history and tradition in urban design, and neighborhoods design standards such as LEED-ND are often used in an attempt to influence livability.

==== Crimes ====
Some crimes against property (e.g., graffiti and vandalism) and some "victimless crimes" have been referred to as "quality-of-life crimes". American sociologist James Q. Wilson encapsulated this argument as the broken windows theory, which asserts that relatively minor problems left unattended (such as litter, graffiti, or public urination by homeless individuals) send a subliminal message that disorder, in general, is being tolerated, and as a result, more serious crimes will end up being committed (the analogy being that a broken window left broken shows an image of general dilapidation).

Wilson's theories have been used to justify the implementation of zero tolerance policies by many prominent American mayors, most notably Oscar Goodman in Las Vegas, Richard Riordan in Los Angeles, Rudolph Giuliani in New York City and Gavin Newsom in San Francisco. Such policies refuse to tolerate even minor crimes; proponents argue that this will improve the quality of life of local residents. However, critics of zero tolerance policies believe that such policies neglect investigation on a case-by-case basis and may lead to unreasonably harsh penalties for crimes.

== In healthcare ==
Within the field of healthcare, quality of life is often regarded in terms of how a certain ailment affects a patient on an individual level. This may be a debilitating weakness that is not life-threatening; life-threatening illness that is not terminal; terminal illness; the predictable, natural decline in the health of an elder; an unforeseen mental/physical decline of a loved one; or chronic, end-stage disease processes. Researchers at the University of Toronto's Quality of Life Research Unit define quality of life as "The degree to which a person enjoys the important possibilities of his or her life". Their Quality of Life Model is based on the categories "being", "belonging", and "becoming"; respectively who one is, how one is connected to one's environment, and whether one achieves one's personal goals, hopes, and aspirations.

Experience sampling studies show substantial between-person variability in within-person associations between somatic symptoms and quality of life. Hecht and Shiel measure quality of life as "the patient's ability to enjoy normal life activities" since life quality is strongly related to wellbeing without suffering from sickness and treatment.

== In international development ==
Quality of life has been deemed an important concept in the field of international development because it allows development to be analyzed on a measure that is generally accepted as more comprehensive than standard of living. Within development theory, however, there are varying ideas concerning what constitutes desirable change for a particular society. The different ways that quality of life is defined by institutions, therefore, shape how these organizations work for its improvement as a whole.

Organisations such as the World Bank, for example, declare a goal of "working for a world free of poverty", with poverty defined as a lack of basic human needs, such as food, water, shelter, freedom, access to education, healthcare, or employment. In other words, poverty is defined as a low quality of life. Using this definition, the World Bank works towards improving quality of life through the stated goal of lowering poverty and helping people afford a better quality of life.

Other organizations, however, may also work towards improved global quality of life using a slightly different definition and substantially different methods. Many NGOs do not focus at all on reducing poverty on a national or international scale, but rather attempt to improve the quality of life for individuals or communities. One example would be sponsorship programs that provide material aid for specific individuals. Although many organizations of this type may still talk about fighting poverty, the methods are significantly different.

Improving quality of life involves action not only by NGOs but also by governments. Global health has the potential to achieve greater political presence if governments were to incorporate aspects of human security into foreign policy. Stressing individuals' basic rights to health, food, shelter, and freedom addresses prominent inter-sectoral problems negatively impacting today's society, and may lead to greater action and resources. Integration of global health concerns into foreign policy may be hampered by approaches that are shaped by the overarching roles of defense and diplomacy.

== See also ==
- Canadian Index of Wellbeing
- Circles of Sustainability
- Depression (mood)
- Eudaimonia
- Euthanasia
- Flourishing
- Happiness
- Human security
- Livability
- Mental health
- Positive psychology
- Poverty
- Occupational burnout
- Quality of working life
- Rational expectations
- Rehabilitation psychology
- Simple living
- Social policy
- Social rejection
- Subjective well-being
- Well-being

=== Indices ===
- Bhutan GNH Index
- Broad measures of economic progress
- Cost-of-living index
- Disability-adjusted life year
- Green national product
- Gender-related Development Index
- Genuine Progress Indicator
- Gross National Happiness
- Gross National Well-being
- Happiness economics
- Happy Planet Index
- Housing affordability index
- Human Development Index
- Progressive utilization theory
- Legatum Prosperity Index
- Leisure satisfaction
- Median income
- OECD Better Life Index
- Post-materialism
- Psychometrics
- Right to health
- Subjective life satisfaction
- Where-to-be-born Index
- Wikiprogress
- World Happiness Report
- World Values Survey

=== Journals ===
- Journal of Business Ethics
- Social Indicators Research
