= Making Connections Survey =

The Making Connections Survey is a neighborhood-based, longitudinal and cross-sectional survey funded by the Annie E. Casey Foundation. It serves as an evaluation of a larger initiative supported by the foundation and was designed to collect data measuring how neighborhood change affects the well-being of children. The Making Connections Survey was conducted by National Opinion Research Center at the University of Chicago between 2002 and 2011 with residents in ten low-income communities across the United States. The final survey dataset includes responses from roughly 28,000 interviews at three points in time.

== The Making Connections Initiative ==
In 1999, the Annie E. Casey Foundation launched the 10-year Making Connections Initiative is a collaboration of local organizations and residents that seeks to improve outcomes for disadvantaged children by strengthening their families, improving their neighborhoods, and raising the quality of local services. The initiative was founded on three propositions:

- Neighborhood features related to social, political, and economic networks impact family well-being.
- Coordinated action can, over time, change the character of neighborhoods in ways that are beneficial to children
- Data are essential to planning, promoting, and conducting community interventions.

In the selected sites, the Annie E. Casey Foundation activities were centered on achieving three key benchmarks for children and families:

1. More families have increased earnings and income,
2. More families have increased levels of assets, and
3. More young children are healthy and prepared to succeed in school.

In order to reach these goals, Annie E. Casey Foundation endorsed a “two-generation approach” to combating poverty and creating opportunities for families. This approach aims to promote family economic success and ensure that children get a “good start” in life by succeeding in early grades of school and reading proficiently by the end of third grade.

In February 2011, Sheryl Edelen, a reporter for the Louisville Courier Journal, said the program aims "to help low-income parents and their children improve their lives by plugging them into a network of 3,600 peers, churches, schools, organizations and agencies that can help them find better jobs, better manage and save money, and use reliable services close to home, such as child care."

== The Making Connections Survey ==
In 2001, the Annie E. Casey Foundation commissioned the National Opinion Research Center to plan and execute a large-scale, longitudinal neighborhood-based survey. Participants were sampled from the following cities: Denver, CO; Des Moines, IA; Indianapolis, IN; Hartford, CT; Louisville, KY; Milwaukee, WI; Oakland, CA; Providence, RI; San Antonio, TX; and White Center (near Seattle), WA.

To evaluate the Making Connections Initiative, the survey measured the effects of various neighborhood interventions over time in relation to a baseline study conducted early in 2002–2004. By determining if measurable progress in factors like safety, health care, and childcare is being made in the study communities, the Annie E. Casey Foundation hopes that communities will be able to use the data to achieve grassroots improvement in the future. Data was collected on the following topics: residential mobility, neighborhood change, child welfare, social networks, civic engagement, income, assets, savings, employment, and local interests, as well as household demographics.

The project was unique in that not only were the residents of the Making Connections neighborhoods respondents, but they were also research partners. Residents were involved in data review, and they were able to take part in the decision-making process regarding what issues the community should focus on.

== Findings from the Making Connections Survey ==
Results from the Making Connections Survey allow social scientists, community activists, and other researchers to examine household characteristics like race, employment, income, and residential stability in the context of greater neighborhood-level trends. The survey results are available to approved researchers through the National Opinion Research Center's data enclave. The application process is outlined here.

Examples of empirical findings from research using the Making Connections Survey data:

- Based on digitized images from resident-drawn maps, Coulton et al. (2011) find that “even among residents living in close proximity to one another, there were a number of divergent opinions about neighborhood names, sizes, and boundaries.”
- Hendy and Kingsley (2009) analyzed the trends and conditions which took place over time in the metropolitan and county areas surrounding the surveyed neighborhoods. Their findings include: an increase in minorities, different employment trends between the metropolitan areas, decrease in social distress indicators, and housing markets which reflect national trends.
- Kingsley and Hayes (2010) found two significant differences between 2002/3 and 2008/9 in the ethnic composition of the neighborhoods in five sites, "a decline for whites (from 44% to 39%) and an increase for Hispanics (from 31% to 36%).
- Kingsley and Hayes (2010) also found that "[s]ubstantial numbers of Making Connections families with children both receive and give help from or to family or friends. Whether the help is financial or not, they are more likely to give it than receive it."
