= Leisure satisfaction =

Positive emotional state from leisure activities

Leisure satisfaction is the positive perceptions or feelings that an individual forms, elicits and gains as a result of engaging in leisure activities and choices. "Leisure refers to activities that a person voluntarily engages in when they are free from any work, social or familial responsibilities." What can contribute to leisure satisfaction is to what degree an individual is currently satisfied with their leisure experiences and activities. An individual might attain positive feelings of contentment and happiness that result from the satisfaction of needs. Participation in leisure activities and leisure satisfaction are inextricably linked to an individual's health. Caldwell suspects that leisure activities may be associated with a number of defensive traits that enhance a person's resiliency to negative life experiences. Some aspects of leisure activities that can act as protective factors include: "[the activity] being personally meaningful, intrinsically interesting and/or challenging; offering social support and friendships; contributing to a sense of competence and/or self efficacy; offering a sense of personal control, choice and self-determination; and being relaxing and/or distracting the individual from negative life events." Leisure activities, although ranging in types, have also proven to be beneficial to health cross-culturally.

== Subjective well-being ==
In a study by Hribernik and Mussap, leisure satisfaction was found to predict unique variance in life satisfaction, supporting its inclusion as a distinct life domain contributing to subjective well-being. Additionally, relationship status interacted with age group and gender on differences in leisure satisfaction. The relationship between leisure satisfaction and life satisfaction, however, was reduced when considering the impact of core affect (underlying mood state). This suggests that leisure satisfaction may primarily be influenced by an individual's subjective well-being level as represented by core affect. This has implications for possible limitations in the extent to which leisure satisfaction may be improved beyond pre-existing levels of well-being and mood in individuals.

In another study published by Brajsa-Zagnec et al. in 2010, subjective well-being (SWB) was defined as a combination of an individual's emotional reactions, satisfaction with specific aspects of one's life, and satisfaction with one's whole life. Many studies have been conducted to determine what specific leisure activities are linked to SWB. Research identifies other groups of leisure activities ranging from three to eleven to sixteen groups. There is no overall agreement regarding what specific groups of leisure activities predict SWB, but some researchers agree that leisure activities contribute to SWB and that the relationship between the two is complex.

Data was collected from a group of Croatian citizens ranging across various age groups. The participants estimated their SWB and time spent participating in leisure activities. These leisure activities included active socializing and going out (sports, going to clubs, eating dinner out etc.), visiting cultural events (reading books, going to concerts, going to movies etc.), and family and home activities (going to church, visiting family, watching television etc.). The results of the study found specific leisure activities to be a predictor of SWB across age groups. For people ages 31–60 participation in visiting cultural events, family leisure activities, and active socializing and going out contributed to SWB. A significant positive correlation was found between family leisure activities and SWB of men and women across different age groups. This study concluded that participation in leisure activities lead to SWB, though the importance of such specific leisure activities vary across different age and genders. Essentially, people may improve their SWB by participating in leisure activities, especially in family and home activities.

== Family leisure activities and quality of life ==
A study conducted by London et al. in 1977 was about job and leisure satisfaction contributing to quality of life (QOL). QOL was determined by asking the participants "How do you feel about your life as a whole" twice during the run of the study. As well, the participants were asked to fill out a survey that measured feelings about leisure, work, and life. It was found that activities that had to do with families and people they socialize with was significant to QOL. Overall non-job related activities (leisure activities) can be more important and a better predictor of QOL as opposed to variables of job related activities. People should consider the importance of the amount of time spent in leisure activities.

== Family leisure activities and family life satisfaction ==
In a study published by Agate et al. in 2009, participants required a child and parent from a family to fill out an online survey which measured the amount of involvement in family leisure activities and the satisfaction with involvement of family leisure activities. It was found that families' involvement in leisure activities is the best predictor for overall family life satisfaction, even more than the amount of time spent together. In early adolescent years, the amount and the satisfaction of family leisure experiences are important to the perceptions of satisfaction with family life that the adolescents will develop later on in life. In 2003, Zabriskie and McCormick, the study that Agate modeled his off of, also concluded that involvement in family leisure activities was the single strongest predictor of satisfaction with family life. As well, benefits of participation in family leisure activities are better communication skills among the family, better problem solving strategies, development of life and social skills, and better overall satisfaction with family life. Overall research has provided evidence for significant correlations between leisure satisfaction and satisfaction with family life.

== Leisure activities and marital satisfaction ==
Not much empirical data has been collected regarding leisure activities and marital satisfaction. But with the research that has been conducted, it has been found that leisure activities influence marital satisfaction positively. Happily married men and women were likely to value spending time together, enjoy activities done together, and agree on recreation needs. Some research has focused on the compatibility between married couples and this influence on the types of leisure activities they choose and the relationship between their overall marital satisfactions. Some research that focused on the relationship between leisure companionship and marital satisfaction found these couples tended to participate in activities that both partners enjoyed.

In a study published by Orthner et al. in 1975, the overall amount of time spent together in leisure activities is positively related to marital satisfaction for both males and females. Participants filled out a questionnaire measuring the pattern of interaction between spouses during leisure time and how much time is spent in individual, parallel, and joint leisure activities. It was found that wives spent more time alone in leisure activities than husbands across the marital career, but this individual participation was negatively correlated with marriage satisfaction. As well, the scores for marriage satisfaction were more stable for wives than husbands over time. Overall, this study concluded that the benefit of participating in leisure activities as a married couple is improved communication. Marital participation in leisure activities is the most critical during the first years of marriage and after 18–23 years of marriage when the marital relationship is reestablishing itself.

Research regarding compatibility in spouses and the relationship between leisure activities and marital satisfaction have found that the couples who are less compatible are more prone to pursue leisure activities separately than highly compatible couples. This study concluded that the more spouses liked the leisure activities they were participating in, the higher their marital satisfaction was. Essentially the results of this study determined that couples participating in leisure activities together positively correlated with their marriage satisfaction.

== Psychological functioning ==
The importance of leisure activities has been studied in various aspects of life. One of the most prevalent aspects of life studied with importance of leisure satisfaction is for people with psychological issues. Some psychological issues can consist of common concerns such as stress or more complex concerns such as clinical disorders. Whether a person experiences stressors at work, through depression or brain injuries, leisure satisfaction may ease the stress regardless of the type. Stress in the workforce is a common issue many people face in their lifetime, however, leisure activities may help lower a person's stress levels and increase their satisfaction. When someone engages in enjoyable leisure activities, their moods tend to increase, which in turn, allows them to better accept everyday stressors. When faced with difficult job situations one must be able to achieve adequate free time to truly enjoy their leisure activity of choice. Another important aspect of leisure activity is the type performed, whether is it an active or passive activity. In 2009, Joudrey & Wallace published a study that statistically found the importance of active leisure activity. Passive leisure activities were suggested to give workers an ability to "escape", which in end could cause depressive moods. However, workers participating in active leisure showed considerably higher levels of mental health.

People with mental disabilities often lack the ability or confidence to participate in social events, such as leisure activities. However, studies such as the one published by Lloyd, King, Lampe, & McDougall in 2001 have been performed to prove the true importance of leisure among patients with mental disabilities. The results from their study showed a strong positive relationship between leisure satisfaction and the patients' met needs. The results basically state that the more leisure patients experienced, the more likely they felt their social, education and psychological needs were met. The study concluded that leisure is as important for people with psychiatric disabilities as it is for the general public. As Lloyd et al. explained, the general public may view an event, such as a leisure activity, as unsatisfactory, but to a mental patient a leisure activity can greatly raise their average happiness. Prvu conducted a study among brain injury patients. Results showed that patients involved in the leisure activity program that helped increase leisure skills and knowledge of community resources also provided patients with an increase in self-confidence and leisure participation, which in turn increased leisure satisfaction. Leisure activity can be a significant factor in lowering a person's level of depressive symptoms.

== See also ==
- Leisure
- Subjective well-being
- Quality of life
- Positive psychology
- Flow (psychology)
- Self-determination theory
- Psychological resilience
- Family life education
- Occupational stress
- Mental health
- Recreational therapy
