= Gender survey question =

Method for asking a user's gender

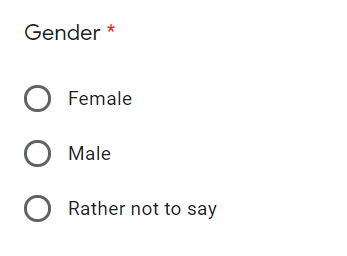
gender survey question from a July 2020 Wikimedia Foundation questionnaire for the Code of Conduct project

A gender survey question is the question in a survey asking for the respondent to report their gender. In questionnaire construction the survey designer may make this an open-ended question or multiple choice.

In 2018 the General Social Survey began releasing data on respondents' self-identified gender.

Historically surveys have only offered options for respondents to indicate being either male or female. More inclusive surveys may offer more options.

Some respondents will not want to indicate being either male or female and will wish for additional options.

Sex and gender are important demographic characteristics to understand in social research, but for information on these things to be meaningful, researchers must be thoughtful in collecting the data.

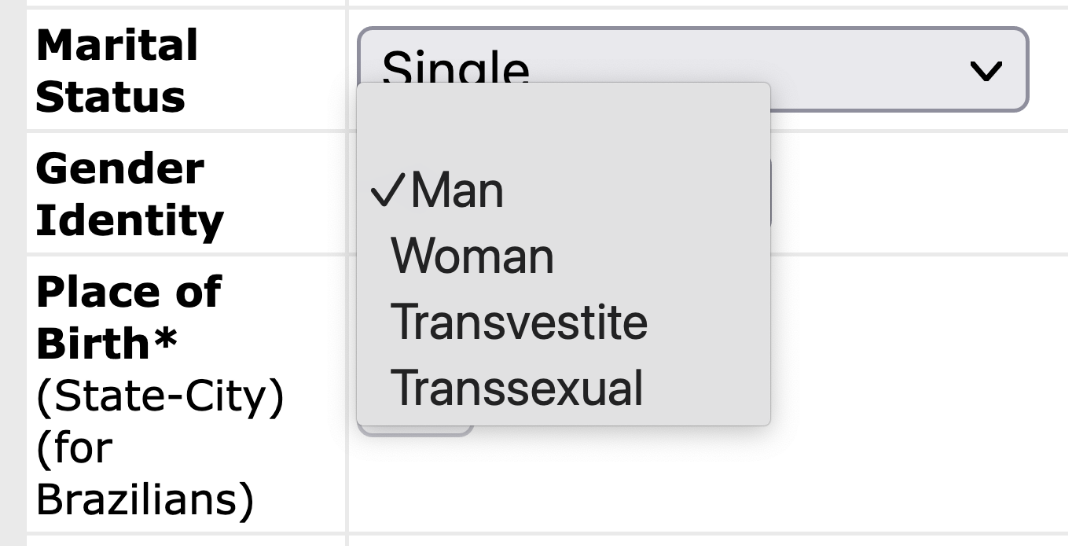
2021 research application

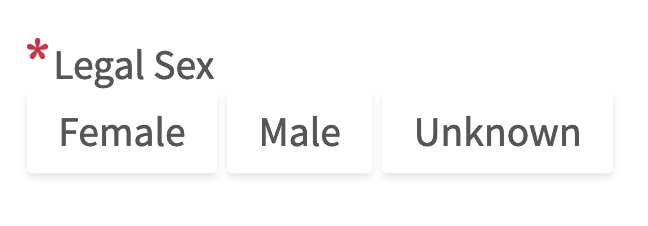
2021 hospital registration form

== Further consideration ==
- Fonseca, Sabrina (4 September 2020). "Designing forms for gender diversity and inclusion". Medium.
