= AmeriSpeak =

AmeriSpeak is a nationally representative, probability-based survey of the U.S. household population created in 2014 by NORC at the University of Chicago.

== Methodology ==
Randomly selected U.S. households are sampled with a known, nonzero probability of selection from the NORC National Frame, and then contacted by U.S. mail and telephone. A subsample of non-responding households is selected to receive additional, in-person follow-up from field interviewers. NORC's National Frame is designed to provide over 99% sample coverage by supplementing the USPS Delivery Sequence File.

In 2018, NORC released a document detailing their survey methodology.

== Published studies ==
The AmeriSpeak Panel has been published in various national media. Below are some examples:

- Associated Press (AP): Many youths say high school diploma is enough
- The New York Times: Americans blame obesity on willpower, despite evidence it's genetic
- Fox News: Two-thirds of US would struggle to cover $1,000 emergency
- AP News: AP-NORC Poll: Health care is the issue that won't go away
- The New York Times: In protests of net neutrality repeal, teenage voices stood out
- Just Capital: Rediscovering our moral compass, JUST Capital's 2017 list of America's most JUST companies
- The Associated Press-NORC: New year, same priorities: the public's agenda for 2018
- The Associated Press-NORC: The problem and impact of sexual misconduct
- The Washington Post: 79 percent of Americans would take a pay cut to work for a more 'just' company
- USA Today: Veterans are prime targets for phone scams, pitches for upfront benefits buyouts
- WebMD: Credentials don't shield doctors, nurses from bias
- The Associated Press-NORC: Long-term caregiving, the types of care older Americans provide and the impact on work and family
- SpaceRef: A record number of Americans viewed the 2017 solar eclipse
- The New York Times: Can you develop food allergies at any age?
- The Washington Post: Teens who spend less time in front of screens are happier—up to a point, new research shows
- Scientific American: What Americans think of human enhancement technologies
- NORC: NORC uses predictive analytics and an AmeriSpeak survey to answer important questions about "Hamilton: An American Musical"
