= Subjective well-being =

Self-reported measure of well-being

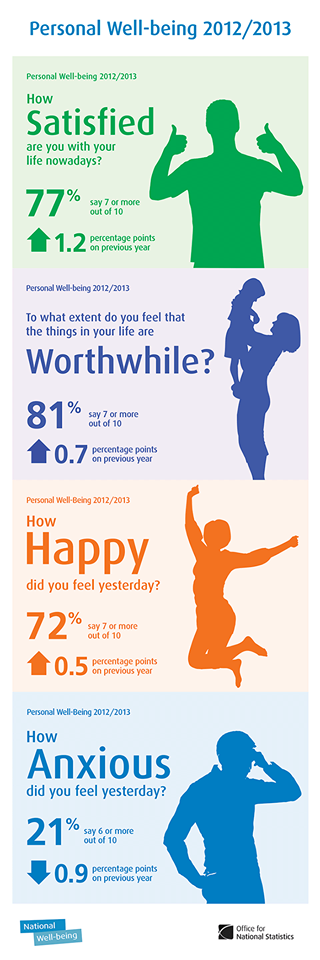
UK personal wellbeing survey from 2012 to 2013, showing how many people scored themselves a 7 or higher on various factors

Subjective well-being (SWB) is a concept of well-being (happiness) that focuses on evaluations from the perspective of the people whose lives are being evaluated rather than from an objective viewpoint. SWB measures often rely on self-reports, but that does not make them SWB measures. Objective measures of wellbeing are also sometimes measured with self-reports and SWB can also be measured with informant ratings.

Ed Diener defined SWB in terms of three indicators of subjective well-being: frequent positive affect, infrequent negative affect, and cognitive evaluations such as life satisfaction.

SWB includes two different subjective measures of well-being that are based on different definitions of happiness. Experiences of positive affect (mood, emotions), and experiences of negative affect (mood, emotions) can be used to create a measure of the amount of positive and negative affect in people's lives. These hedonic balance scores measure subjective wellbeing from a hedonistic perspective that define happiness as high PA and low NA. Life-satisfaction is based on a subjective view of happiness. Accordingly, there is no objective way to define happiness and people have to define it for themselves. They then use their own definition of happiness to evaluate their actual. Therefore SWB is not a definition of happiness. Rather it is a label for two definitions of happiness, a hedonistic one and a subjective one. Both are based on subjective experiences, but the subjective experiences are different. Hedonism relies on aggregation of momentary affective experiences. Life-satisfaction relies on the recall and evaluation of past experiences.

Although SWB tends to be stable over the time and is strongly related to personality traits, the emotional component of SWB can be impacted by situations; for example, the onset of the COVID-19 pandemic, lowered emotional well-being by 74%. There is evidence that health and SWB may mutually influence each other, as good health tends to be associated with greater happiness, and a number of studies have found that positive emotions and optimism can have a beneficial influence on health.

== Construction of SWB ==
Diener argued that the various components of SWB represent distinct constructs that need to be understood separately, even though they are closely related. Hence, SWB may be considered "a general area of scientific interest rather than a single specific construct". Due to the specific focus on the subjective aspects of well-being, definitions of SWB typically exclude objective conditions such as material conditions or health, although these can influence ratings of SWB. Definitions of SWB therefore focus on how a person evaluates his/her own life, including emotional experiences of pleasure versus pain in response to specific events and cognitive evaluations of what a person considers a good life. Components of SWB relating to affect include positive affect (experiencing pleasant emotions and moods) and low negative affect (experiencing unpleasant, distressing emotions and moods), as well as "overall affect" or "hedonic balance", defined as the overall equilibrium between positive and negative affect, and usually measured as the difference between the two. High positive affect and low negative affect are often highly correlated, but not always.

== Components of SWB ==
There are three components of SWB: affect (hedonic measures), life satisfaction (cognitive measures), and eudaimonia (a sense of meaning and purpose). Current research recognizes the importance of accurately assessing SWB within a society by focusing on how each component of SWB impacts the individual.

=== Affect ===
Affect refers to the emotions, moods, and feelings a person has. These can be all positive, all negative, or a combination of both positive and negative. Some research shows also that feelings of reward are separate from positive and negative affect. Research also recognizes that when evaluating subjective well-being, approaches to affect can be interchangeable between children and adults.

=== Life satisfaction ===
Life satisfaction (global judgments of one's life) and satisfaction with specific life domains (e.g. work satisfaction) are considered cognitive components of SWB. The term "happiness" is sometimes used in regards to SWB and has been defined variously as "satisfaction of desires and goals" (therefore related to life satisfaction), as a "preponderance of positive over negative affect" (therefore related to emotional components of SWB), as "contentment", and as a "consistent, optimistic mood state" and may imply an affective evaluation of one's life as a whole. Life satisfaction can also be known as the "stable" component in one's life. Affective concepts of SWB can be considered in terms of momentary emotional states as well as in terms of longer-term moods and tendencies (i.e. how much positive and/or negative affect a person generally experiences over any given period of time). Life satisfaction and in some research happiness are typically considered over long durations, up to one's lifetime. "Quality of life" has also been studied as a conceptualization of SWB. Although its exact definition varies, it is usually measured as an aggregation of well-being across several life domains and may include both subjective and objective components.

=== Eudaimonia ===
Eudaimonic measures seek to quantify traits like virtue and wisdom as well as concepts related to fulfilling our potential such as meaning, purpose, and flourishing. Eudaimonic measures are often regarded as a core component of SWB, particularly in the field of positive psychology. However, it is unclear whether measures of meaning are really measures of wellbeing and little data has been collected on them. It is difficult to prove that eudaimonic measures of SWB are reliable, and more research is needed to increase the reliability of research methods which utilize this component of subjective well-being. As interdisciplinary research becomes more commonplace, a stronger understanding of previously overlooked eudaimonic experiences may arise from more reliable research methods. The importance of assessing an individual's eudaimonia in understanding their subjective well-being can be seen as early as in research with elementary school students.

== Measurement ==
Life satisfaction and Affect balance are generally measured separately and independently.

- Life satisfaction is generally measured using a self-report method. A common measurement for life satisfaction is questionnaires. In SWB research, evaluating life satisfaction is the most common practice.
- Affective balance is also generally measured using a self-report method. An example of a measurement of affective balance is the PANAS (Positive Affect Negative Affect Schedule).

Sometimes a single SWB question attempts to capture an overall picture. For example, the World Happiness Report uses a Cantril ladder survey, in which respondents are asked to think of a ladder, with the best possible life for them being a 10, and the worst possible life being a 0, and are then asked to rate their own current lives on that 0 to 10 scale.

The issue with such measurements of life satisfaction and affective balance is that they are self-reports. The problem with self-reports is that the participants may be lying or at least not telling the whole truth on the questionnaires. Participants may be lying or holding back from revealing certain things because they are either embarrassed or they may be filling in what they believe the researcher wants to see in the results. To gain more accurate results, other methods of measurement have been used to determine one's SWB.

Another way to corroborate or confirm that the self-report results are accurate is through informant reports. Informant reports are given to the participant's closest friends and family and they are asked to fill out either a survey or a form asking about the participants mood, emotions, and overall lifestyle. The participant may write in the self-report that they are very happy, however that participant's friends and family record that he/she is always depressed. This would obviously be a contradiction in results which would ultimately lead to inaccurate results. Informant reports are found to be ineffective to determine the subjective well-being of children.

Another method of gaining a better understanding of the true results is through ESM, or the Experience Sampling Method. In this measure, participants are given a beeper/pager that will randomly ring throughout the day. Whenever the beeper/pager sounds, the participant will stop what he/she is doing and record the activity they are currently engaged in and their current mood and feelings. Tracking this over a period of a week or a month will give researchers a better understanding of the true emotions, moods, and feelings the participant is experiencing, and how these factors interact with other thoughts and behaviors. Measuring an individual's mood over time may also be a reliable indicator of how their SWB is influenced on a day-to-day basis. A third measurement to ensure validity is the Day Reconstruction Method. In this measure, participants fill out a diary of the previous days' activities. The participant is then asked to describe each activity and provide a report of how they were feeling, what mood they were experiencing, and any emotions that surfaced. Thus to ensure valid results, a researcher may tend to use self-reports along with another form of measurement mentioned above. Someone with a high level of life satisfaction and a positive affective balance is said to have a high level of SWB.

The research into the SWB of blue-collar immigrant employees offers an alternative to the self-report method by instead measuring resource loss and gain. In research showing how cognitive, affective, or eudemonic components of SWB relate to consumption, it becomes clear that eudemonia needs to be measured differently than affect or cognition when evaluating an individual's subjective happiness. This research also highlights that an individual's affect can be used to measure SWB in the short-term, while SWB in the long-term can be measured through the Cantril ladder, life satisfaction, or eudemonia. Research into the relationship between the components of SWB and consumption highlights the positive impact relational and experiential consumption have on an individual's SWB, while clarifying how materialistic consumption prevents an individual from experiencing those positive effects. Research limitations that arise when measuring a person's affect include a narrow focus only on the short term, while limitations from measuring life satisfaction can be overly broad in the scope of the results.

== Theories ==
Theories of the causes of SWB tend to emphasize either top-down or bottom-up influences.

=== Top-down perspective ===
In the top-down view, global features of personality influence the way a person perceives events. Individuals may therefore have a global tendency to perceive life in a consistently positive or negative manner, depending on their stable personality traits. Top-down theories of SWB suggest that people have a genetic predisposition to be happy or unhappy and this predisposition determines their SWB "setpoint". Set Point theory implies that a person's baseline or equilibrium level of SWB is a consequence of hereditary characteristics and therefore, almost entirely predetermined at birth. Evidence for this genetic predisposition derives from behavior-genetic studies that have found that positive and negative affectivity each have high heritability (40% and 55% respectively in one study). Numerous twin studies confirm the notion of set point theory, however, they do not rule out the possibility that is it possible for individuals to experience long term changes in SWB.

Diener et al. note that heritability studies are limited in that they describe long-term SWB in a sample of people in a modern western society but may not be applicable to more extreme environments that might influence SWB and do not provide absolute indicators of genetic effects. Additionally, heritability estimates are inconsistent across studies.

Further evidence for a genetically influenced predisposition to SWB comes from findings that personality has a large influence on long-term SWB. This has led to the dynamic equilibrium model of SWB. This model proposes that personality provides a baseline for emotional responses. External events may move people away from the baseline, sometimes dramatically, but these movements tend to be of limited duration, with most people returning to their baseline eventually.

Of the conclusions that can be drawn from assessing the development of subjective well-being across one's life span includes the extent to which the set point of SWB can be considered hereditary, which supports the top-down perspective.

=== Bottom-up perspective ===
From a bottom-up perspective, happiness is created from happy experiences. Bottom-up influences include external events, and broad situational and demographic factors, including health and marital status. Bottom-up approaches are based on the idea that there are universal basic human needs and that happiness results from their fulfilment. In support of this view, there is evidence that daily pleasurable events are associated with increased positive affect, and daily unpleasant events or hassles are associated with increased negative affect.

However, research suggests that external events account for a much smaller proportion of the variance in self-reports of SWB than top-down factors, such as personality. A theory proposed to explain the limited impact of external events on SWB is hedonic adaptation. Based originally on the concept of a "hedonic treadmill", this theory proposes that positive or negative external events temporarily increase or decrease feelings of SWB, but as time passes people tend to become habituated to their circumstances and have a tendency to return to a personal SWB "setpoint" or baseline level.

The hedonic treadmill theory originally proposed that most people return to a neutral level of SWB (i.e. neither happy nor unhappy) as they habituate to events. However, subsequent research has shown that for most people, the baseline level of SWB is at least mildly positive, as most people tend to report being at least somewhat happy in general and tend to experience positive mood when no adverse events are occurring. Additional refinements to this theory have shown that people do not adapt to all life events equally, as people tend to adapt rapidly to some events (e.g. imprisonment), slowly to others (e.g. the death of a loved one), and not at all to others (e.g. noise and sex).

The research behind the development of SWB across one's life span concludes that despite the impact certain experiences may have on an individual's subjective well-being their subjective well-being will eventually return to its set point over time, which supports the bottom-up perspective. Research describes homeostatically protected mood as the numeric set point where an individual's SWB will consistently return, supporting the ideas presented by the bottom-up perspective.

== Factors ==
=== Personality and genetics ===
A number of studies have found that SWB constructs are strongly associated with a range of personality traits, including those in the five factor model. Findings from numerous personality studies show that genetics account for 20–48% of the variance in the Five-Factor Model and the variance in subjective well-being is also heritable. Specifically, neuroticism predicts poorer subjective well-being whilst extraversion, agreeableness, conscientiousness and openness to experience tend to predict higher subjective well-being. A Meta-analyses found that neuroticism, extraversion, agreeableness, and conscientiousness were significantly related to all facets of SWB examined (positive, negative, and overall affect; happiness; life satisfaction; and quality of life). Meta-analytic research shows that neuroticism is the strongest predictor of overall SWB and is the strongest predictor of negative affect.

A large number of personality traits are related to SWB constructs, although intelligence has negligible relationships. Positive affect is most strongly predicted by extraversion, to a lesser extent agreeableness, and more weakly by openness to experience. Happiness was most strongly predicted by extraversion, and also strongly predicted by neuroticism, and to a lesser extent by the other three factors. Life satisfaction was significantly predicted by neuroticism, extraversion, agreeableness, and conscientiousness. Quality of life was very strongly predicted by neuroticism, and also strongly predicted by extraversion and conscientiousness, and to a modest extent by agreeableness and openness to experience. One study found that subjective well-being was genetically indistinct from personality traits, especially those that reflected emotional stability (low Neuroticism), and social and physical activity (high Extraversion), and constraint (high Conscientiousness).

DeNeve (1999) argued that there are three trends in the relationship between personality and SWB. Firstly, SWB is closely tied to traits associated with emotional tendencies (emotional stability, positive affectivity, and tension). Secondly, relationship enhancing traits (e.g. trust, affiliation) are important for subjective well-being. Happy people tend to have strong relationships and be good at fostering them. Thirdly, the way people think about and explain events is important for subjective well-being. Appraising events in an optimistic fashion, having a sense of control, and making active coping efforts facilitates subjective well-being. Trust, a trait substantially related to SWB, as opposed to cynicism involves making positive rather than negative attributions about others. Making positive, optimistic attributions rather than negative pessimistic ones facilitates subjective well-being.

The related trait of eudaimonia or psychological well-being, is also heritable. Evidence from one study supports 5 independent genetic mechanisms underlying the Ryff facets of psychological well-being, leading to a genetic construct of eudaimonia in terms of general self-control, and four subsidiary biological mechanisms enabling the psychological capabilities of purpose, agency, growth, and positive social relations. In research assessing the relationship between health and SWB, psychological well-being emerges as the most inclusive terminology despite the determination of eudaimonia to be outside its scope. Autonomy is identified as one of the six factors that determine an individual's psychological well-being. Research shows the close relationship that autonomy and eudaimonia have with self-determination theory, which identifies autonomy as a basic human need.

=== Social influences ===
A person's level of subjective well-being is determined by many different factors and social influences prove to be a strong one. Results from the famous Framingham Heart Study indicate that friends three degrees of separation away (that is, friends of friends of friends) can affect a person's happiness. From abstract: "A friend who lives within a mile (about 1.6 km) and who becomes happy increases the probability that a person is happy by 25%."

Quality of social connections has a much stronger effect on SWB than the quantity of those connections. Those with fewer but more intimate social contacts report higher levels of SWB than those who have many contacts but lower quality of connections.

One's level of perceived support plays a role in predicting SWB. Those who believe to have a strong support group tend to have higher levels of SWB than those who do not. High levels of negative affect has also been correlated with low perceived social support. Frequent, high quality social interactions coupled with perceived social support will contribute greatly to the SWB a person experiences. Research has consistently shown that social influences are a key mechanism in supporting the homeostasis of one's SWB, as these influences provide the individual with an immediate positive response to whatever situation they may be facing.

By evaluating the research behind the experiences of blue-collar immigrant employees, it becomes clear that social influences have a direct impact on a person's SWB. When looking beyond the aesthetic aspect of relational consumption, the strong relationship that social influence has with SWB also becomes clear.

Research into the effect of social support on SWB shows that the social influence of family strongly impacts an individual's SWB, while the social influence of a friend has little to no impact on their SWB. Other research has concluded that SWB is directly related to social influence but does not reliably measure the cause-and-effect relationship between the two, creating the need for future research.

=== Social media ===
Social media often leads to comparison. When people compare their life experiences with those seen on social media (which are primarily good, happy, or exciting experiences), those people experience a decrease in their quality of life. Fan Xiaojun et al. point out that, because self-presentation on social media is very common, viewers of those pages can experience chronic pressure, leading to overall lower SWB. Social media increases the effects that relational and experiential consumption have on an individual's overall SWB.

The digital footprint left by an individual's social media use can be exploited to assess the SWB of an entire population. Because of the challenges associated with assessing a self-reporting questionnaire from everyone in a population, an opportunity for Twitter to satisfy this need was created by providing a method of collecting large-scale public data that reflects everyone's reaction to their experiences within a population. Research highlights that the challenges associated with using word-level methods to assess subjective well-being can be overcome by utilizing data-driven methods to evaluate Twitter data and proves that the utilization of these methods can reliably predict future health and economic results.

=== Family ===
Research has not demonstrated that there are significant differences in subjective well-being between childless couples and couples with children. A research study by Pollmann-Schult (2014) found that when holding finances and time costs constant, parents are happier and show increased life satisfaction than non-parents. Research has found that unhappy married couples are at 3–25 times the risk of developing clinical depression.

Well-being within a family is determined by the relationship between their available resources and the family's demands. The research behind the relationship SWB has with family dynamics shows that future research needs to incorporate the baseline level at which family dynamics positively influence the SWB and development of adolescents as they prepare to enter society as adults. A positive correlation between an adolescent's SWB and the dynamics within their family is also reflected in research, supporting the idea that an adolescent's SWB depends on their experience with family dynamics. Through examining research highlighting the complexity of gender experiences between countries, it becomes clear that almost all societies on the planet are constructed in a way that favors boys over girls. Girls are more concerned by their satisfaction with self, their satisfaction with peers, and their satisfaction with family, while boys are more concerned by their satisfaction with their performance in school or other objective measures.

=== Wealth and income ===
Research indicates that wealth is related to many positive outcomes in life. Such outcomes include: improved health and mental health, greater longevity, lower rates of infant mortality, experience fewer stressful life events, and less frequently the victims of violent crimes However, research suggests that wealth has a smaller impact on SWB than people generally think, even though higher incomes do correlate substantially with life satisfaction reports. Research by Professor Shigehiro Oishi and colleagues found that the income-happiness correlation grew stronger as income inequality increases. Oishi's prior research on income inequality and happiness found that Americans were on average happier in the years with less national income inequality than in the years with more national income inequality. Moreover, nations with more progressive taxation on income had higher levels of subjective well-being (Oishi, Schimmack, & Diener, 2011).

The relative influence of wealth together with other material components on overall subjective well-being of a person is being studied through new research. The Well-being Project at Human Science Lab investigates how material well-being and perceptual well-being works as relative determinants in conditioning our mind for positive emotions.

In a study done by Aknin, Norton, & Dunn (2009), researchers asked participants from across the income spectrum to report their own happiness and to predict the happiness of others and themselves at different income levels. In study 1, predicted happiness ranged between 2.4 and 7.9, and actual happiness ranged between 5.2 and 7.7. In study 2, predicted happiness ranged between 15–80 and actual happiness ranged between 50 and 80. These findings show that people believe that money does more for happiness than it really does. However, some research indicates that while socioeconomic measures of status do not correspond to greater happiness, measures of sociometric status (status compared to people encountered face-to-face on a daily basis) do correlate to increased subjective well-being, above and beyond the effects of extroversion and other factors.

The Easterlin Paradox also suggests that there is no connection between a society's economic development and its average level of happiness. Through time, the Easterlin has looked at the relationship between happiness and gross domestic product (GDP) across countries and within countries. There are three different phenomena to look at when examining the connection between money and Subjective well-being; rising GDP within a country, relative income within a country, and differences in GDP between countries.

More specifically, when making comparisons between countries, a principle called the Diminishing Marginal Utility of Income (DMUI) stands strong. Veenhoven (1991) said, "[W]e not only see a clear positive relationship [between happiness and GNP per capita], but also a curvilinear pattern; which suggest that wealth is subject to a law of diminishing happiness returns." Meaning a $1,000 increase in real income, becomes progressively smaller the higher the initial level of income, having less of an impact on subjective well-being. Easterlin (1995) proved that the DMUI is true when comparing countries, but not when looking at rising gross domestic product within countries.

=== Health ===
There are substantial positive associations between health and SWB so that people who rate their general health as "good" or "excellent" tend to experience better SWB compared to those who rate their health as "fair" or "poor". A meta-analysis found that self-ratings of general health were more strongly related to SWB than physician ratings of health. The relationship between health and SWB may be bidirectional. There is evidence that good subjective well-being contributes to better health. A review of longitudinal studies found that measures of baseline subjective well-being constructs such as optimism and positive affect predicted longer-term health status and mortality. Conversely, a number of studies found that baseline depression predicted poorer longer-term health status and mortality. Baseline health may well have a causal influence on subjective well-being so causality is difficult to establish. A number of studies found that positive emotions and optimism had a beneficial impact on cardiovascular health and on immune functioning. Changes in mood are also known to be associated with changes in immune and cardiovascular response. There is evidence that interventions that are successful in improving subjective well-being can have beneficial effects on aspects of health. For example, meditation and relaxation training have been found to increase positive affect and to reduce blood pressure. The effect of specific types of subjective well-being is not entirely clear. For example, how durable the effects of mood and emotions on health are remains unclear. Whether some types of subjective well-being predict health independently of others is also unclear. Meditation has the power to increase happiness because it can improve self-confidence and reduces anxiety, which increases your well-being. Cultivating personal strengths and resources, like humour, social/animal company, and daily occupations, also appears to help people preserve acceptable levels of SWB despite the presence of symptoms of depression, anxiety, and stress.

Research suggests that probing a patient's happiness is one of the most important things a doctor can do to predict that patient's health and longevity. In health-conscious modern societies, most people overlook the emotions as a vital component of one's health, while over focusing on diet and exercise. According to Diener & Biswas-Diener, people who are happy become less sick than people who are unhappy. There are three types of health: morbidity, survival, and longevity. Evidence suggests that all three can be improved through happiness:

1. Morbidity, simply put, is whether or not someone develops a serious illness, such as the flu or cancer. In a 30-year longitudinal study, participants who were high in positive emotions were found to have lower rates of many health problems. Some of these illnesses/problems include lower death rates from heart disease, suicide, accidents, homicides, mental illnesses, drug dependency, and liver disease related to alcoholism. Additionally, results showed that depressed participants were more likely to have heart attacks and recurrences of heart attacks when compared to happy people.
2. Survival is the term used for what happens to a person after he/she has already developed or contracted a serious illness. Although happiness has been shown to increase health, with survival, this may not be the case. Survival may be the only area of health that evidence suggests happiness may actually be sometimes detrimental. It is unclear why exactly research results suggest this is the case, however Diener & Biswas-Diener offer an explanation. It is possible that happy people fail to report symptoms of the illness, which can ultimately lead to no treatment or inadequate treatment. Another possible reason may be that happy people tend to be optimistic, leading them to take their symptoms too lightly, seek treatment too late, and/or follow the doctor's instructions half-heartedly. And lastly, Diener & Biswas-Diener suggest that people with serious illnesses may be more likely to choose to live out their lives without painful or invasive treatments.
3. Longevity, the third area of health, is measured by an individual's age of death. Head researcher Deborah Danner of the University of Kentucky researched links between an individual's happiness and that individual's longevity. Danner recruited 180 Catholic nuns from a nearby convent as the participants of her study. She chose nuns because they live very similar lives. This eliminates many confounding variables that might be present in other samples, which can lead to inaccurate results. Such confounding variables could include substance use, diet, and sexual risk-taking. Since there are few differences among the nuns as far as the confounding variables, this sample offered the best option to match a controlled laboratory setting. Results showed that nuns who were considered happy or positive in their manner and language on average lived 10 years longer than the nuns who were considered unhappy or negative in their manner and language. A follow-up study by health researcher Sarah Pressman examined 96 famous psychologists to determine if similar results from the nun research would be seen as well. Pressman's results showed that the positive or happy psychologists lived, on average, 6 years longer. The psychologists who were considered negative or unhappy lived, on average, 5 years less. The positive emotions produced by SWB are shown through research to increase longevity over a 28-year period, while also providing a reliable measure of how SWB impacts an individual's longevity by excluding aging populations that would not have provided an accurate measure of mortality, and by using a more comprehensive view of an individual's SWB to determine the effect on longevity. The research behind how SWB impacts longevity also establishes a baseline for health within the population and supports other research conclusions which state that an individual's social network creates a similar relationship with longevity to SWB.

=== Physical characteristics ===
A positive relationship has been found between the volume of gray matter in the right precuneus area of the brain, and the subject's subjective happiness score. A six-week mindfulness based intervention was found to correlate with a significant gray matter increase within the precuneus.

Research that examines the relationship between age and subjective well-being shows that peak psychological well-being can be found in an individual's old age, which also reflects the time in their life when self-discrepancy is least available and accessible to an individual. By understanding what maximizes the utility of an individual's experiences, an individual can gain the ability to ensure that they age positively. Since this research shows the significant impact goal discrepancies have on an individual's subjective well-being, it is also implied that managing an individual's goal discrepancies serves as a tool to maintain positive subjective well-being. The research behind the effect of leisure activities on SWB comes to the conclusion that SWB decreases in old age, adding that quality of life also begins to decrease for this demographic.

=== Leisure ===
There are a number of domains that are thought to contribute to subjective well-being. In a study by Hribernik and Mussap (2010), leisure satisfaction was found to predict unique variance in life satisfaction, supporting its inclusion as a distinct life domain contributing to subjective well-being. Additionally, relationship status interacted with age group and gender on differences in leisure satisfaction. The relationship between leisure satisfaction and life satisfaction, however, was reduced when considering the impact of core affect (underlying mood state). This suggests that leisure satisfaction may primarily be influenced by an individual's SWB level as represented by core affect. This has implications for possible limitations in the extent to which leisure satisfaction may be improved beyond pre-existing levels of well-being and mood in individuals. Multiple sources have examined the way that leisure activities can positively impact an individual's SWB through assessing relational consumption. Research shows that regular leisure activities are positively correlated with SWB while the individual's preferred activity itself may vary between gender and age groups, thus indicating the need for further study around SWB benefits provided by leisure activities in relation to gender and age. One leisure activity that research has shown to benefit both genders and all age groups is leisure activities involving family. Going forward, research examining the effects of adolescent's engagement in leisure activities over a long period of time may show their long-term effects on an individual's SWB throughout their life.

=== Cultural variations ===
Although all cultures seem to value happiness, cultures vary in how they define happiness. There is also evidence that people in more individualistic cultures tend to rate themselves as higher in subjective well-being compared to people in more collectivistic cultures.

In Western cultures, predictors of happiness include elements that support personal independence, a sense of personal agency, and self-expression. In Eastern cultures, predictors of happiness focus on an interdependent self that is inseparable from significant others. Compared to people in individualistic cultures, people in collectivistic cultures are more likely to base their judgments of life satisfaction on how significant others appraise their life than on the balance of inner emotions experienced as pleasant versus unpleasant. Pleasant emotional experiences have a stronger social component in East Asian cultures compared to Western ones. For example, people in Japan are more likely to associate happiness with interpersonally engaging emotions (such as friendly feelings), whereas people in the United States are more likely to associate happiness with interpersonally disengaging emotions (pride, for example). There are also cultural differences in motives and goals associated with happiness. For example, Asian Americans tend to experience greater happiness after achieving goals that are pleasing to or approved of by significant others compared to European Americans. There is also evidence that high self-esteem, a sense of personal control and a consistent sense of identity relate more strongly to SWB in Western cultures than they do in Eastern ones. However, this is not to say that these things are unimportant to SWB in Eastern cultures. Research has found that even within Eastern cultures, people with high self-esteem and a more consistent sense of identity are somewhat happier than those who are low in these characteristics. There is no evidence that low self-esteem and so on are actually beneficial to SWB in any known culture.

A large body of research evidence has confirmed that people in individualistic societies report higher levels of happiness than people in collectivistic ones and that socioeconomic factors alone are insufficient to explain this difference. In addition to political and economic differences, individualistic versus collectivistic nations reliably differ in a variety of psychological characteristics that are related to SWB, such as emotion norms and attitudes to the expression of individual needs. Collectivistic cultures are based around the belief that the individual exists for the benefit of the larger social unit, whereas more individualistic cultures assume the opposite. Collectivistic cultures emphasize maintaining social order and harmony and therefore expect members to suppress their personal desires when necessary in order to promote collective interests. Such cultures therefore consider self-regulation more important than self-expression or than individual rights. Individualistic cultures by contrast emphasize the inalienable value of each person and expect individuals to become self-directive and self-sufficient. Although people in collectivistic cultures may gain happiness from the social approval they receive from suppressing self-interest, research seems to suggest that self-expression produces a greater happiness "payoff" compared to seeking approval outside oneself.

Despite westerners reporting higher levels of subjective well-being than easterners, they also have more frequent reports of depression. The differing beliefs on self-expression help explain what may at first seem paradoxical. Westerners tend to encourage individual expression, which leads to a greater focus on one's own emotions. This increased self-awareness combines with the normative belief that joy should be more common than sadness. People living under these conditions can catastrophize their own negative emotions; feeling increased sadness over the fact that they are either not currently happy or frequently happy. Easterners tend to be more concerned about their collective's feelings over their own individual feelings. They do not typically catastrophize their sadness but instead learn to brush it off.

Blue-collar immigrant workers fill a significant gap in the world economy, yet their experiences are often either overlooked or overly generalized, such as research that measures all immigrant's experiences as a single group. Research has shown that the country which a person immigrates to has a significant influence on their experience with SWB. The nature of immigration also leads to immediate resource loss when a person leaves their family and community of origin. An individual's cultural values may ultimately prevent them from seeking a psychological need if it is not supported by those values, highlighting that determining the uniform psychological needs of a population from research requires careful consideration of the population's cultural variations.

One conclusion that can be drawn from the research behind the advantages of data-driven methods over word-level methods in assessing SWB of a population is that cultural variations may be overlooked or biases may arise unconsciously from word-level methods, while data-driven methods can accurately account for the socioeconomic implications of language beyond the positive or negative influence of the word.

Even within cultures, there have been historical variations in concepts of happiness. Using dictionary definitions from 30 different nations, Oishi et al. (2013) found that happiness was most frequently defined as good luck and favorable external conditions. While this was the case as well in the United States, over time, this definition was replaced by definitions focused on favorable internal feeling states.

=== Positive psychology ===
Positive psychology is particularly concerned with the study of SWB. Positive psychology was founded by Seligman and Csikszentmihalyi (2000) who identified that psychology is not just the study of pathology, weakness, and damage; but it is also the study of strength and virtue. Researchers in positive psychology have pointed out that in almost every culture studied the pursuit of happiness is regarded as one of the most valued goals in life. Understanding individual differences in SWB is of key interest in positive psychology, particularly the issue of why some people are happier than others. Some people continue to be happy in the face of adversity whereas others are chronically unhappy at the best of times.

Positive psychology has investigated how people might improve their level of SWB and maintain these improvements over the longer term, rather than returning to baseline. Lyubomirsky (2001) argued that SWB is influenced by a combination of personality/genetics (studies have found that genetic influences usually account for 35–50% of the variance in happiness measures), external circumstances, and activities that affect SWB. She argued that changing one's external circumstances tends to have only a temporary effect on SWB, whereas engaging in activities (mental and/or physical) that enhance SWB can lead to more lasting improvements in SWB. Research shows that positive psychology can be used to determine the point at which an individual's SWB is in homeostasis, meaning a reliable baseline can be provided to assess and maintain the SWB of a population. By defining a normative range from which to measure SWB, positive psychology is able to identify individuals and groups that may benefit the most from interventions. Research also tells us that when the SWB of a group is initially very low, any intervention will likely be sufficient in providing the resources needed to support the return of their SWB to homeostatic levels.

=== Nature ===
The recent interest in subjective well-being components described in literature has led to research into value of urban green spaces. If we continue to include SWB measurements when creating urban spaces, then we will continue to gain a better understanding of how urban planning influences an individual's experience. A better understanding of psychological and medical topics will lead us to seek the benefits that come from improving our relationship with nature as humans. As we deepen our understanding of ourselves and our experience, we must also recognize the value that the environment provides to humans and the value that humans provide to the environment. Research reviews around the SWB benefits associated with cultural economic systems show the need for established universal terminology to allow for the ease of interdisciplinary collaboration. Because a person's relationship with nature can be assessed both objectively and subjectively, it is difficult to measure all of the benefits UGS's provide to the SWB of society.

Research shows that nature relatedness directly impacts an individual's SWB. Nature relatedness is defined as our connection as humans with the universe. Greater nature relatedness in people reflects greater affect and life satisfaction when evaluating the impact of nature relatedness on the components of subjective well-being, and also reflects a strong correlation between nature relatedness and eudaimonic perspectives when environmental attitudes are part of the control group.

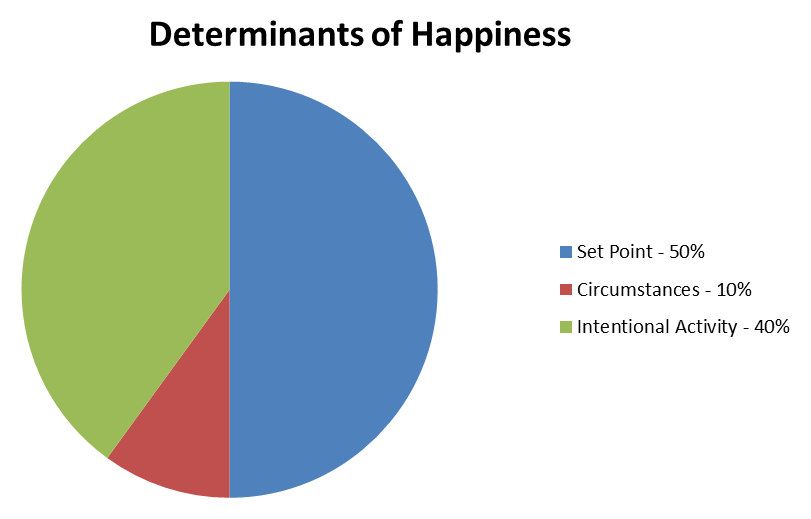
According to Sonja Lyubomirsky, the determinants of happiness are a combination of a person's genetic set-point, intentional activities and life circumstances.

== Use in happiness economics ==
SWB is often used in appraising the wellbeing of populations.

=== Economic factors ===
Economic systems theory offers a baseline for various disciplines to determine value.

Macroeconomics infers a positive correlation between gross domestic product and national income with citizen's individual welfare. Current research into objective macroeconomic influences can be used to evaluate society and inform public policy by inferring SWB expectations for the future. Even when focusing on the internal components of an individual's happiness, it is still clear that macroeconomic factors positively influence SWB while providing a reliable source of measurement to determine an individual's experience in society. Shared Socioeconomic Pathways have emerged from the research behind the relationship between SWB and the macroeconomic factors which coincide with an individual's life-satisfaction. The SSP's developed by this research have pushed the interdisciplinary boundaries by using data from both past experiences and future expectations to address climate change issues. The discipline may also continue to grow through the development of scenarios which measure both social support and freedom of choice, and by using Sustainable Development Goals to implement another long-term scenario supported by the concept that SWB is a static factor. The goal of welfare research is to quantify the social welfare function, a process that has been propelled forward by the increased accessibility of SWB data. Early welfare literature highlights social choice theory as the methodology behind collectively conveying the experience of the individual to express the social welfare function. Despite the many variables accounted for in this research, the conclusion that socio-economic development will strongly influence the SWB of the population remains constant and clear.

Microeconomics infers that an individual maximizes the utility of their resources through consumption. Microeconomic theory overlooks the value saving can have on an individual's experience, and also directly influenced the thinking behind researching the relationship between SWB and consumption.

=== Workplace ===
SWB in the workplace increases productivity and the meaning people make through their work. Many factors can affect SWB in the workplace. One of the bigger factors is negative gossip. A study from Xiamen University found that negative gossip is highly correlated with low levels of SWB. To combat this issue, Cheng et al. suggest offering support to employees who feel psychological distress and help the staff increase their emotional intelligence.

When a person has high levels of SWB in the workplace, that person is often more productive. SWB helps employees to feel less burned out, leading to higher productivity and more desire or willingness to work extra hours. Many people consider SWB, in the workplace specifically, as a necessary condition for happiness. In other words, these people are saying that, if they do not feel SWB in the workplace, they will not feel happiness in life.

Employee's SWB has not only lead to higher profits, but also higher customer loyalty and lower turnover. Prioritizing the SWB of the employees benefits all aspects of an organization.

== See also ==
- Canadian Index of Wellbeing
- Personality psychology
- Flow
- Lived experience
- Religion and happiness
- Reasonable person model (RPM)
- Well-being contributing factors
