= GESIS – Leibniz Institute for the Social Sciences =

Organization

Coordinates: 49.4857°N 8.4629°E

The GESIS – Leibniz Institute for the Social Sciences is the largest German infrastructure institute for the social sciences. It is headquartered in Mannheim, with a location in Cologne. With basic research-based services and consulting covering all levels of the scientific process, GESIS supports researchers in the social sciences. As of 2017, the president of GESIS is Christof Wolf.

GESIS is part of the Leibniz Association and receives federal and state funding.

== History ==
Established in 1986 as German Social Science Infrastructure Services (Gesellschaft Sozialwissenschaftlicher Infrastruktureinrichtungen), GESIS originally consisted of the three independent institutes:

- Social Science Information Centre (InformationsZentrum Sozialwissenschaften, IZ) in Bonn,
- Central Archive for Empirical Social Research (Zentralarchiv für Empirische Sozialforschung, ZA) in Cologne, and
- Centre for Survey Research and Methodology (Zentrum für Umfragen, Methoden und Analysen, ZUMA) in Mannheim.

In 2007, the three GESIS institutes merged into one. In November 2008, GESIS added "Leibniz Institute for the Social Sciences" to its name in order to emphasize its membership in the Leibniz Association.

In November 2011, GESIS Bonn and Cologne were merged into one location in Cologne.

== WikiWho ==
WikiWho, developed by Fabian Flöck and Maribel Acosta and hosted by GESIS, "parses the complete set of all historical revisions (versions) (of Wikipedia articles in different languages) in order to find out who wrote and/or removed and/or reinserted which exact text at token level at what revision". WhoColor and whoVIS are in development. Researchers developing and using WikiWho, also investigated the Gamergate (harassment campaign). In 2021, Fabian Flöck planned to leave GESIS and shut down WikiWho sometime in 2022, however, a Wikimedia Foundation software engineer is working to migrate the infrastructure. Wikimedia Foundation, Community Tech Team has released Who Wrote That?, a browser extension, for Mozilla Firefox and Chromium-based browsers using WikiWho. Contropedia is a related "platform for the real-time analysis and visualization of such controversies in Wikipedia".
