= General Social Survey =

Ongoing sociological survey studying American society

- Logo of NORC at the University of Chicago

Agency overview
- Formed: 1972
- Jurisdiction: United States
- Headquarters: Chicago, Illinois
- Employees: ~3,000 respondents per wave (varies)
- Parent agency: NORC at the University of Chicago
- Website: gss.norc.org

The General Social Survey (GSS) is a sociological survey created in 1972 by James A. Davis of the National Opinion Research Center (NORC) at the University of Chicago and funded by the National Science Foundation. The GSS collects information biannually and keeps a historical record of the concerns, experiences, attitudes, and practices of residents of the United States.

Since 1972, the GSS has been monitoring societal change and studying the growing complexity of American society. It is one of the most influential studies in social sciences and is frequently referenced in news media, including The New York Times, The Wall Street Journal, and the Associated Press.

The data collected for this survey includes both demographic information and respondents' opinions on matters ranging from government spending to the state of race relations to the existence and nature of God. Because of the wide range of topics covered and the comprehensive gathering of demographic information, survey results allow social scientists to correlate demographic factors like age, race, gender, and urban/rural upbringing with beliefs and thereby determine whether, for example, an average middle-aged black male respondent would be more or less likely to move to a different U.S. state for economic reasons than a similarly situated white female respondent; or whether a highly educated person with a rural upbringing is more likely to believe in a transcendent God than a person with an urban upbringing and only a high school education.

In 2011, the GSS was linked to the National Death Index. This freely available dataset allows researchers to explore the association between variables in the General Social Survey and human longevity. For instance, it is possible to explore the association between happiness and life expectancy. The dataset and codebook are available for download to the public.

== Objectives ==
The General Social-Survey has three main purposes:

- Gather data to monitor and explain trends, changes, and constants in attitudes, behaviors, and attributes as well as examine the structure, development, and functioning of society in general as well as the role of various sub-groups
- Compare the United States to other societies to place American society in comparative perspective and develop cross-national models of human society
- Make up-to-date, important, high-quality data easily accessible to scholars, students, policymakers, and others with minimal cost and waiting

== History ==
The GSS was first conducted in 1972. Until 1994, it was conducted annually (with the exceptions of the years 1979, 1981, and 1992). Since 1994, the GSS has been conducted in even-numbered years.

In 1984, the GSS was a cofounder of the International Social Survey Programme (ISSP), a collaboration between different nations that conducts surveys for social science research. The first ISSP questions were asked as part of the GSS. Since 1985, the ISSP has conducted an annual cross-national survey and the GSS has participated in each ISSP round.

In 1991, the first auxiliary study to the GSS was conducted. Called the National Organizations Study (NOS), this study gathered a sample of national employers by asking GSS respondents for information on their place of work.

In 1998, the second auxiliary study to the GSS was conducted, called the National Congregations Study (NCS).

In 2002, the survey moved its questionnaire to computer-assisted personal interviewing (CAPI) methods from the previous method of paper-based questioning. Also this year, the second NOS was conducted.

In 2006, a large part of the GSS was administered in Spanish for the first time. In addition, the National Voluntary Associations Study, which also gathered its sample from the GSS by asking respondents about the voluntary associations in which they took part, was conducted. Also this year, the second wave of the NCS was conducted.

From 2008 through 2014, in addition to the sample of respondents selected randomly every round, the GSS sample included one to two rotating panel samples consisting of cases interviewed in a previous round of the survey. Also this year, the full GSS interview was translated into and administered in Spanish for Spanish-speaking US residents.

In 2012, the third wave of the NCS was conducted.

== Methodology ==
The GSS is intended for people (18 and above) living in US homes. The GSS sample is derived from an area probability methodology that selects respondents at random. As a result, participants in the GSS come from a wide spectrum of urban, suburban, and rural areas. Participation in the study is purely voluntary. With only a few thousand people questioned in the original study, every person chosen can contribute significantly to its findings.

Several innovations for the GSS took place. The 2016 survey included an Internet mode experiment. Starting in 2018, respondents have been asked for permission to link to selected administrative records to enable linkage to secondary data. In 2020, post-stratification weights have been introduced.

The survey is administered in person by NORC at the University of Chicago and takes approximately 90 minutes to complete. 30 national samples with 59,599 respondents and 5,900+ variables had been collected as of 2014.

== Results ==
The online GSS Data Explorer allows users to download GSS data that can be imported to statistical programs (e.g., R/SAS/SPSS/Stata). It also allows searching for information about GSS questions, variables, and publications, testing hypotheses, as well as conducting basic analyses. A bibliography maintained by GSS shows more than 25,000 entries of articles, chapters, books, and presentations known to have used GSS data.

== See also ==
- European Social Survey
- German General Social Survey
- International Social Survey Programme
