= Lars Lyberg =

Swedish statistician

Lars Lyberg (1 December 1944 – 9 March 2021) was a Swedish statistician, head of research and development at Statistics Sweden, the founding editor of the Journal of Official Statistics, and a Fellow of the Royal Statistical Society and American Statistical Association. His research focused on data quality, total survey error, and research in the multinational, multiregional, and multicultural contexts.

== Education and career ==
Lyberg received his PhD in statistics from the Stockholm University where he also taught in 2003–2009 and 2010–2015.

He began his career at Statistics Sweden in 1966 and later directed its research and development department until his retirement in 2010. During his tenure, he represented Sweden in the development of ISO Standard 20252 on Market, Opinion and Social Research.

In 1985, he founded the Journal of Official Statistics and served as editor-in-chief for 25 years.

He published numerous articles, books, conference volumes, and task force reports, most notably: Total Survey Error: Past, Present, and Future, Telephone Survey Methodology, Measurement Errors in Surveys, Survey Measurement and Process Quality, Introduction to Survey Quality, Survey Methods in Multicultural, Multinational, and Multiregional Contexts, Survey Error in Practice, AAPOR/WAPOR Task Force Report on Comparative Surveys, and Big Data Meets Survey Science, and posthumously the Handbook of Computational Social Science and Improving the Measurement of Poverty and Social Exclusion in Europe: Reducing non-sampling errors.

== Personal life ==
He was married to Lilli Japec, a senior statistician at Statistics Sweden, and had two adopted sons from his first marriage.

Known by his nickname "Lasse", he enjoyed American baseball, Southern cuisine, and vacationing in Florida. He was also a football (soccer) fan and coach. At the 20th anniversary of the Journal of Official Statistics, Edith de Leeuw and approximately 50 statisticians presented him with a spoof titled the "Journal of Obnoxious Statistics (JOBS)".

== Awards and recognition ==
Lyberg was an elected member of the International Statistical Institute and a Fellow of the Royal Statistical Society. In 1993, he was elected as a Fellow of the American Statistical Association.

In 2012, the International Association of Survey Statisticians (IASS) recognized him with the Waksberg Award for his contributions in the area of survey quality. In 2013, he was awarded the Helen Dinerman Award from the World Association for Public Research. The American Association for Public Opinion Research honored him in 2018 with the Award for Exceptionally Distinguished Achievement. In recognition of his achievements in statistics for societal benefit, the Swedish Statistical Association named him 2019 statistician of the year.

A virtual memorial was held at the 2021 Joint Statistical Meeting where Lyberg was remembered for his scholarship, humility, and sense of humor. Since 2021, Demoskop has held The Lyberg Conference annually in Sweden with a YouTube live stream, covering topics concerning data collection, quality, and innovations.
