= Spiral of silence =

Political science and mass communication theory

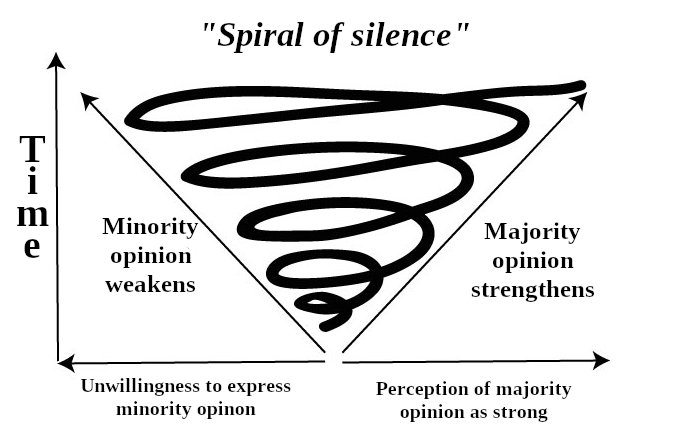
Spiral of silence illustrated

The spiral of silence theory is a political science and mass communication theory which states that an individual's perception of the distribution of public opinion influences that individual's willingness to express their own opinions. Also known as the theory of public opinion, the spiral of silence theory claims individuals will be more confident and outward with their opinion when they notice that their personal opinion is shared throughout a group. But if the individual notices that their opinion is unpopular with the group, they will be more inclined to be reserved and remain silent. In other words, from the individual's perspective, "not isolating themself is more important than their own judgement", meaning their perception of how others in the group perceive them is more important to themself than the need for their opinion to be heard. The spiral happens as the minority voluntarily silences itself, which causes the majority to become louder as they take silence for agreement and believe they have no or little opposition, which in turn makes the minority even less likely to speak up.

According to Glynn (1995), "the major components of the spiral of silence include (1) an issue of public interest; (2) divisiveness on the issue; (3) a quasi-statistical sense that helps an individual perceive the climate of opinion as well as estimate the majority and minority opinion; (4) 'fear of isolation' from social interaction "(though, whether this is a causal factor in the willingness to speak out is contested)"; (5) an individual's belief that a minority (or 'different') opinion isolates oneself from others; and (6) a 'hardcore' group of people whose opinions are unaffected by others' opinions."

The theory is not without criticism, some arguing that its widely understood definition and parameters have not been updated to reflect the behavior of 21st century society. Others point out that there is no room within the theory to account for variables of influence other than social isolation.

== Background ==
In 1974, Elisabeth Noelle-Neumann, a German political scientist, created the model called "Spiral of Silence". She believed that an "individual's willingness to express his or her opinion was a function of how he or she perceived public opinion." In 1974, Neumann and her husband founded the "Public Opinion Organization" in Germany. She was also the President of the "World Association for Public Opinion Research" from 1978 to 1980.

Noelle-Neumann evolved the spiral of silence theory from research on the 1965 West German federal election. The research, according to Noelle-Neumann, "measured a lot more than we understood". The two major parties were locked in a dead heat from December until September, with a series of questions of public perception of the election winner was showing steady, independent movement. During the final days of the election, 3 to 4% of the voters shifted in the direction of the public's perception of the winner. A similar shift happened in the 1972 election, which began the development of the spiral of silence as a theory of public opinion.

According to Shelly Neill, "Introduced in 1974, the Spiral of Silence Theory [...] explores hypotheses to determine why some groups remain silent while others are more vocal in forums of public disclosure." The spiral of silence theory suggests that "people who have believed that they hold a minority viewpoint on a public issue will remain in the background where their communication will be restrained; those who believe that they hold a majority viewpoint will be more encouraged to speak." The spiral of silence theory arose from a combination of high public uncertainty about a topic with an increase in the flow of communication.

The theory explains the formation of social norms at both the micro and macro level. "As a micro-theory, the spiral of silence examines opinion expression, controlling for people's predispositions – such as fear of isolation, and also demographic variables that have been shown to influence people's willingness to publicly express opinions on issues, such as agricultural biotechnology." This micro effect is seen in experiments such as the Asch conformity experiments, conducted as early as the 1950s, in which a group of students are asked to compare the length of lines. All but one student are coached ahead of time on what answers to give and how to behave. When the coached subjects gave unanimously incorrect answers, the dissenter tended to agree with the majority, at times even when the difference between the lines was so egregious as seven inches. On the macro level, the spiral of silence occurs if more and more members of the perceived minority fall silent. This is when public perceptions of the opinion climate begin to shift. "In other words, a person's individual reluctance to express his or her opinion, simply based on perceptions of what everyone else thinks, has important implications at the social level." As one opinion gains interest, the amount of exposure it receives increases, leading the public to believe it is the majority. The perceived minority then faces the threat and fear of isolation from society unless they conform. As the opinion gains momentum, the perceived minority falls deeper into their silence. This continues until the perceived minority no longer speaks out against it, either by presenting an image of agreement or actually conforming, and the opinion of the perceived majority ultimately becomes a social norm. Large scale effects of the spiral of silence can be seen when examining the growth of the dominant opinion within a country's political climate or other such issues.

The spiral of silence has continued to be observed and studied since then. In today's world, technology can play a key part in the spiral of silence, something that could not have been predicted at the time of its inception. For example, survey data showed that during the 2016 US presidential election, opinion congruency for democratic candidate Hillary Clinton in society at large and for republican candidate Donald Trump on Facebook had indirect associations for willingness to present one's opinion both offline and online.

=== Spiral model ===
The spiral model is used to visually represent the theory. It claims that an individual is more likely to go down the spiral if his or her opinion does not conform with the perceived majority opinion. The following steps summarize how the process works:

1. The model begins with individuals' inherent desire to blend with society. The fear of social isolation is necessary for the spiral to occur.
2. Individuals who notice that their personal opinion is spreading will voice this opinion confidently in public. On the other hand, individuals who notice that their opinions are losing ground will be inclined to adopt a more reserved attitude when expressing their opinions in public.
3. Representatives of the spreading opinion talk quite a lot while the representatives of the second opinion remain silent. An opinion that is being reinforced in this way appears stronger than it is, while a suppressed opinion will seem weaker than it is.
4. The result is a spiral process which prompts other individuals to perceive the changes in opinion and follow suit until one opinion becomes established as the prevailing attitude. Meanwhile, the other opinion is pushed back and rejected by most. The end of the spiral refers to the number of people who are not publicly expressing their opinions, due to the fear of isolation.

In summary, the spiral model is a process of formation, change, and reinforcement of public opinion. The tendency of the one to speak up and the other to be silent begins a spiraling process which increasingly establishes one opinion as the dominant one.

Furthermore, Noelle-Neumann describes the spiral of silence as a dynamic process, in which predictions about public opinion become fact as mass media's coverage of the majority opinion becomes the status quo, and the minority becomes less likely to speak out.

=== Relationship with other kinds of social influence ===
The basic ideas for the spiral of silence are not unique and are closely related to theories on conformity. In 1987, Kerr, MacCoun, Hansen and Hymes introduced the idea of the "momentum effect". The momentum effect states that if some members of a group move toward a particular opinion, others will follow. Others have described similar "gain-loss effect" (Aronson & Linder, 1965), and "bandwagon effect" (Myers & Lamm, 1976). Experiments also show how the spiral of silence and the bandwagon effect jointly undermine minority positions when pre-election polls are shown to voters.

== Epistemology ==
=== Public ===
Scholars have misguided interpretations of "public opinion", confusing it with government and therefore limiting the understanding of the term as it relates to the theory. Noelle-Neumann clarifies this by creating three distinct meanings of "public". The first is the legal term used to define "public land" or "public spaces". The second concerns the issues of people as seen in journalism. Finally, public as in "public eye" is used in social psychology and refers to the way people think outwardly about their relationships. Public, in this sense, could be characterized as social psychology. This is the meaning intended to emphasize how subjects feel in social settings during conducted research.

Scholars have marveled in amazement at the power public opinion has in making regulations, norms, and moral rules triumph over the individual self without ever troubling legislators, governments, or courts for assistance.

=== Opinion ===
"Common Opinion" is how the Scottish social philosopher David Hume referred to public opinion in his 1739 published work A Treatise of Human Nature. Agreement and a sense of the common are what lay behind the English and French "opinion". In researching the term opinion (Meinung in German) researchers were led back to Plato's Republic. In Plato's Republic, a quote from Socrates concluded that opinion takes the middle position. Immanuel Kant considered the opinion to be an "insufficient judgment, subjectively as well as objectively". How valuable opinion may be was left out; however, the fact that it is suggested to be unified agreement of a population or segment of the population, was still considered.

=== Public opinion ===
The term public opinion first emerged in France during the eighteenth century. The definition of public opinion has been debated over time. There has not been much progress in locking in one classification of the phrase public opinion; however, Hermann Oncken, a German historian, stated:

Whoever desires to grasp and define the concept of public opinion will recognize quickly that he is dealing with a Proteus, a being that appears simultaneously in a thousand guises, both visible and as a phantom, impotent and surprisingly efficacious, which presents itself in innumerable transformations and is forever slipping through our fingers just as we believe we have a firm grip on it ... That which floats and flows cannot be understood by being locked up in a formula ... After all, when asked, everyone knows exactly what public opinion means.

It was said to be a "fiction that belonged in a museum of the history of ideas; it could only be of historical interest."

In contradiction to that quote, the term public opinion never fell out of use. During the early 1970s, Elisabeth Noelle-Neumann was creating the theory of the spiral of silence. She was attempting to explain why Germans who disagreed with Hitler and the Nazis remained silent until after their regime ended. Behavior like that has come to be known as the spiral of silence theory. Noelle-Neumann began to question if she was indeed getting a handle on what public opinion actually was. "The spiral of silence might be one of the forms in which public opinion appeared; it might be a process through which a new, youthful public opinion develops or whereby the transformed meaning of an old opinion spreads."

The American sociologist Edward Ross described public opinion in 1898 using the word "cheap". "The equation of 'public opinion' with 'ruling opinion' runs like a common thread through its many definitions. This speaks to the fact that something clinging to public opinion sets up conditions that move individuals to act, even against their own will."

Other scholars point out that the emergence of the public opinion depends on an open public discourse rather than "on the discipline imposed by an apparent majority dominant enough to intimidate but whose views may or may not support actions that are in the common interest." They have also considered whose opinion establishes public opinion, assumed to be persons of a community who are ready to express themselves responsibly about questions of public relevance. Scholars have also looked into the forms of public opinion, said to be those that are openly expressed and accessible; opinions that are made public, especially in the mass media. Controversy surrounding this term spiraled around both words combining to form the phrase.

Neumann (1955) suggests two concepts on public opinion:

Public Opinion as Rationality: The public opinion or "dominant view" comes after conscious rational public discussion. Childs (1965) and Wilson (1933) believe that "the rational model is based on the notion of an enlightened, rational public that is willing to and capable of participating in political processes." In all, it is political and necessary for generating social change.

Public Opinion as Social Control: This is at the root of the spiral of silence theory. It means that "opinions that can be expressed without risking sanctions or social isolation, or opinions that have to be expressed in order to avoid isolation (Noelle-Neumann 1983). Social systems require cohesion. To achieve this, individuals are threatened with social isolation.

== In mass media contexts ==
=== Media and public opinion ===
Mass media's effects on both public opinion and the perception of the public opinion are central to the spiral of silence theory. One of the earliest works that called attention to the relationship between media and the formation of public opinion was Walter Lippmann's book "Public Opinion", published in 1922. Ideas of Lippmann regarding the effects of media influenced the emergence of the spiral of silence theory. As she is building the spiral theory, Noelle-Neumann states "the reader can only complete and explain the world by making use of a consciousness which in large measure has been created by the mass media."

Agenda-setting theory is another work that Noelle-Neumann builds on as she is characterizing media's effect on the public opinion. Agenda-setting theory describes the relationship between media and public opinion by asserting that the public importance of an issue depends on its salience in the media. Along with setting the agenda, the media further determine the salient issues through a constant battle with other events attempting to gain place in the agenda. The media battle with these news alternatives by creating "pseudo-crises" and "pseudo-novelties".

Media's characteristics as a communication tool further affect people's perception of their own ideas in regard to the public opinion. According to Noelle-Neumann, the media are a "one-sided, indirect, public form of communication, contrasting threefold with the most natural form of human communication, the conversation." When an issue hits the media and proves salient, a dominant point of view usually emerges. These characteristics of the media in particular further overwhelm one's individual ideas.

While some media communication theories assume a passive audience, such as the Hypodermic Needle model, the spiral model assumes an active audience "who consumes media products in the context of their personal and social goals." Knowledge "gained from the mass media may offer ammunition for people to express their opinions and offer a rationale for their own stance." Ho et al. point out that "among individuals who paid high amount of media attention, those who have a low fear of isolation were significantly more likely to offer a rationale for their own opinion than were those who have a high fear of isolation."

Noelle-Neuman regards media as central to the formulation of the Spiral of Silence Theory, whereas some scholars argue whether the dominant idea in one's social environment overwhelms the dominant idea that media propose as the perceived social norm. Some empirical research align with this perspective; suggesting that the "micro-climate" of an individual overwhelms the effects of the media. Other articles further suggest that talking with others is the primary way of understanding the opinion climate.

=== Social media ===
Current literature suggests that the spiral model can be applied to the social media context. Researchers, Chaudhry & Gruzd (2019) found that social media actually weakens this theory. They contest that the spiral of silence suggests that the minority are uncomfortable expressing their opinions because of the fear of isolation, but, "the vocal minority are comfortable expressing unpopular views, questioning the explanatory power of this popular theory in the online context."

However, in another study, Gearhart and Zhang examine whether or not the use of social media will increase people's motivation to express their opinions about political issues. The results suggest that social media users "who have received a strong negative reaction to their politically related posts are likely to censor themselves, exemplifying the spiral of silence effect". Another study found that the fear of isolation causes people to not want to share their opinion on social media in the first place. Similar to the Gearhart and Zhang study, results from this study showed that people are more likely to self-censor information on social media by not posting some things that are political, choosing what and what not to follow or like, etc.

Another research confirms the positive relationship between speaking out and issue importance on the social media context as well: individuals who view gay bullying as a significant social issue are more likely to comment on Facebook.

Artificially generated social engagement is also worth noting. As social media becomes more and more important in our daily lives, deceptive social bots have been successfully applied for manipulating online conversations and opinions. Social bots are social media accounts managed by computer algorithms. They can automatically generate content and interact with human users, often impersonating or imitating humans. Current research shows that "social bots" are being used on a large scale to control the opinion climate to influence public opinion on social media. In some cases only a small number of social bots can easily direct public opinion on social media and trigger a spiral of silence model. For example, scholars find out that social bots can affect political discussion around the 2016 U.S. presidential election and the 2017 French presidential election.

== Assumptions ==
=== Perception ===
The Spiral of Silence Theory rests on the assumption that individuals will scan their environment to assess the climate to possibly find the dominant point of view. Perception matters because these opinions influence an individual's behavior and attitudes. Sherif (1967) believes individuals use frames of reference based on past experience to inform their perception – "social environment as a frame of reference for interpreting new information has important implications for public opinion research". It is also worth mentioning that the assessment of one's social environment may not always correlate with reality.

==== Quasi-statistical organ ====
Noelle-Neumann attributed this ability of assessing opinion climate on an issue to the so-called "quasi-statistical organ", which refers to how individuals unconsciously assess the distribution of viewpoints and the chances that certain viewpoints will succeed over others. People assume they can sense and figure out what others are thinking.

The mass media play a large part in determining what the dominant opinion is, since our direct observation is limited to a small percentage of the population. The mass media have an enormous impact on how public opinion is portrayed, and can dramatically impact an individual's perception about where public opinion lies, whether or not that portrayal is factual.

==== Pluralistic ignorance ====
Pluralistic ignorance may occur in some cases in which the minority opinion is incorrectly accepted as the norm. Group members may be privately rejecting a norm, but may falsely assume that other group members accept it. This phenomenon, also known as a collective illusions, is when people in a group think everyone else has a different opinion from theirs and go along with the norm.

=== Fear of isolation ===
The spiral of silence can lead to a social group or society isolating or excluding members due to the members' opinions. This stipulates that individuals have a fear of isolation. This fear of isolation consequently leads to remaining silent instead of voicing opinions.

The fear of isolation is the "engine that drives the spiral of silence". Essentially, people fear becoming social isolates and thus take measures to avoid such a consequence, as demonstrated by psychologist Solomon Asch in the Asch conformity experiments. People feel more comfortable agreeing with the dominant opinions instead of expressing their own ideas.

An underlying idea of the spiral of silence theory is that public opinion acts as a form of social control. According to Noelle-Neumann's definition this key concept describes "opinions on controversial issues that one can express in public without isolating oneself". This assumption supposed that public opinion is governed by norms and conventions, the violation of which will lead to sanctions against those individuals. Going off of this assumption that going against public opinion will lead to social sanctions, Noelle-Neumann assumes that human beings have an inherent fear of isolation and will adapt their behavior so that they will not be isolated from others. This "fear of isolation" is so strong that people will not express opinions if they assume that these opinions differ from public opinion.

== How does the fear of isolation function? ==
This fear of social isolation is a central concept in Noelle-Neumann's theory but throughout different studies on the theory it has been conceptualized in many different ways. Some researchers have considered fear of social isolation to be transitory and triggered by the exposure to a situation in which an individual is expected to express an opinion. In this conceptualization an individual's perception of the opinion climate in a specific situation would trigger the fear of isolation in that moment.

Other researchers have argued that instead of a situation-specific reaction, fear of social isolation can be viewed as an individual characteristic that varies between people and leads individuals to continuously monitor their environment for cues about the opinion climate. While there are individuals who generally do not suffer from a fear of isolation (what Noelle-Neumann referred to as Hardcores) others are constantly aware of their social environment and face the persistent fear of isolation. Individuals who bear this characteristic of fear of social isolation and at the same time perceive their opinion to be incongruent with the majority opinion climate are less likely to be willing to voice their opinion. In this line of spiral of silence research fear of social isolation is a key concept in formation of public opinion, however research has often assumed this conceptualization as a fact without empirical proof or been inconsistent in the empirical measurement of this phenomenon.

Recent research has been able to capture the concept of fear of social isolation in a more reliable and consistent way. One example is a study by Jörg Matthes and colleagues, which treated fear of isolation as something that differs from person to person, like a personality trait, instead of something triggered only in certain situations. They measured it with a five-question scale, along with questions about how willing people are to keep their opinions to themselves, in an online survey of more than 2,200 people in nine countries. In eight of those countries, people who feared isolation more were also more likely to hold back their opinions. China was the exception, where the researchers found no link. Other researchers consider fear of social isolation to be a subsequent reaction to encountering a perceived hostile opinion climate which in turn leads the individual to not voice their own opinions and therefore sets in motion the spiral of silence. A study in South Korea on genetically modified foods found something similar. People who are afraid of being left out in general were less willing to speak up. People who saw their view as unpopular were also a little less willing to talk about it in public.

Although many accept fear of isolation to be the motivation behind the theory, arguments have been made for other causal factors. For example, Lasorsa proposed it may be less a fear of isolation fueling the spiral, and more about political interest (in the case of political debate) and self-efficacy. From a more positive standpoint, Taylor suggested the benefits of opinion expression, whether that opinion was common or not, to be the motivation. When studying the willingness to discuss an issue so divisive as abortion, Salmon and Neuwirth found only "mixed supportive evidence" for fear of isolation, and instead found that knowledge and personal concern of the issue played important roles. Kim adds two more possible reasons. One is bandwagon effect, where people start to side with whoever they think is winning. The other is doubt: people who feel they are in the minority may be less sure they are right.More examples follow at the end of the article.

=== Responses to disputed and undisputed opinions ===
Where opinions are relatively definite and static – customs, for example – one has to express or act according to this opinion in public or run the risk of becoming isolated. In contrast, where opinions are in flux, or disputed, the individual will try to find out which opinion he can express without becoming isolated.

== Vocal minority and hardcore ==
The theory explains a vocal minority (the complement of the silent majority) by stating that people who are highly educated, or who have greater affluence, and the few other cavalier individuals who do not fear isolation (if that is accepted to be the causal factor), are likely to speak out regardless of public opinion. In Noelle-Neumann's polls in Germany, men, younger people, and people from the middle and upper classes were also more willing to say what they thought in public.It further states that this minority is a necessary factor of change while the compliant majority is a necessary factor of stability, with both being a product of evolution. There is a vocal minority, which remains at the top of the spiral in defiance of threats of isolation.

This theory calls these vocal minorities the hardcore nonconformist or the avant-garde. Hardcore nonconformists are "people who have already been rejected for their beliefs and have nothing to lose by speaking out." The hardcore has the ability to reconfigure majority opinion, while the avant-garde are "the intellectuals, artists, and reformers in the isolated minority who speak out because they are convinced they are ahead of the times."

Hardcore is best understood when the majority voices loses power in public opinion due to a lack of alternatives. People's opinions may affect narrow-minded views as a result of the hard core's efforts to educate the public. Hardcore may be instrumental in changing public opinion even though it is frequently engaged in irrational acts to prove their point.

== Real world application of the theory ==
The spiral of silence has brought insight regarding diverse topics, ranging from speaking about popular culture phenomena to smoking. Considering that the spiral of silence is more likely to occur in controversial issues and issues with a moral component, many scholars have applied the theory to controversial topics, such as abortion, affirmative action, capital punishment, mandatory COVID-19 vaccines and masking.

=== Social capital ===
The spiral of silence theory can be also applied to the context of social capital. Recent studies see social capital as "a variable that enables citizens to develop norms of trust and reciprocity, which are necessary for successful engagement in collective activities". One study examines three individual-level indicators of social capital: civic engagement, trust and neighborliness, and the relationship between these indicators and people's willingness to express their opinions and their perception of support for one's opinions. The results suggest that civic engagement has a direct effect on people's willingness to express their opinions and neighborliness and trust had direct positive effects on people's perception of support for one's opinions. Also, the study shows that "only a direct (but not indirect) effect of civic engagement on opinion expression further highlights a potential difference between bonding and bridging social capital".

=== Cross-cultural studies ===
Existing literature prior to the spiral of silence theory suggests a relationship between social conformity and culture, motivating communication scholars to conduct cross-cultural analysis of the theory. Scholars in the field of psychology in particular previously addressed the cultural variance involved in the conformity to the majority opinion. More recent studies confirm the link between conformity and culture: a meta-analysis regarding Asch conformity experiments, for example, suggest that collectivist cultures are more likely to exhibit conformity than the individualistic cultures.

==== The United States and Taiwan ====
"A Cross-Cultural Test of the Spiral of Silence" by Huiping Huang analyzes the results of a telephone survey done in Taiwan and the United States. The hypotheses tested were the beliefs that the United States is an "individualistic" society, while Taiwan is a "collectivist" society. This suggested that the spiral of silence is less likely to be activated in the United States, because individuals are more likely to put emphasis on their personal goals. They put the "I" identity over the "we" identity, and strive for personal success. Therefore, it was hypothesized that they would be more likely to speak out, regardless of if they are in the minority. On the other hand, it was predicted that individuals in Taiwan put more emphasis on the collective goal, so they would conform to the majority influence in hopes of avoiding tension and conflict. The study also tested the effect of motives, including self-efficacy and self-assurance.

Telephone surveys were conducted; the citizens of the United States were questioned in regard to American involvement in Somalia, and the citizens of Taiwan about the possibility of a direct presidential election. Both issues focused on politics and human rights, and were therefore comparable. Respondents were asked to choose "favor", "neutral" or "oppose" in regard to the categories of themselves, family and friends, the media, society, and society in the future about the given issue. Measurements were also taken regarding the individualism and collectivism constructs, and the "motives of not expressing opinion" based on a 1–10 and 1–5 scale respectively, in approval of given statements.

Results showed support for the original hypothesis. Overall, Americans were more likely to speak out than Taiwanese. Being incongruous with the majority lessened the motivation of the Taiwanese to speak out (and they had a higher collectivist score), but had little effect on the Americans. In Taiwan, future support and belief of society played a large role in likeliness to voice an opinion, and support that the activation of the spiral of silence is in effect. In the United States, it was hypothesized that because they were more individualistic, they would be more likely to speak out if in the minority, or incongruous group. However, this was not true, but Huang suggests that perhaps the issue chosen was not directly prevalent, and therefore, they found it "unnecessary to voice their objections to the majority opinion". Lack of self-efficacy led to lack of speaking out in both countries.

==== Basque nationalism ====
Basque Nationalism and the Spiral of Silence is an article by Spencer and Croucher that analyzes the public perception of ETA (Euskadi Ta Askatasuna, a militant separatist group) in Spain and France. This study was conducted in a similar way as above, with Basque individuals from Spain and France being questioned about their support of ETA. They were asked questions such as "How likely would you be to enter into a conversation with a stranger on a train about ETA?" Taken into consideration were the cultural differences of the two different regions in which ETA existed.

The results supported the theory of the spiral of silence. While there was a highly unfavorable opinion of the group, there was a lack of an outcry to stop it. Individuals claimed that they were more likely to voice their opinions to non-Basques, suggesting that they have a "fear of isolation" in regard to fellow Basques. Furthermore, the Spanish individuals questioned were more likely to be silent because of their greater proximity to the violent acts.

=== Perceptions in the classroom ===
One study by Henson and Denker "investigates perceptions of silencing behaviors, political affiliation, and political differences as correlates to perceptions of the university classroom climates and communication behaviors." They looked at whether students' view of the classroom changes whether they perceive the instructor and other classmates with a different political affiliation, with the instructor and other classmates communicating using silencing behaviors. The article stated that little has been investigated into student-teacher interactions in the classroom, and how the students are influenced. The goal of the article was to "determine how political ideas are expressed in the university classrooms, and thus, assess the influence of classroom communication on the perceptions of political tolerance."

The article claimed that university classrooms are an adequate place to scrutinize the spiral of silence theory because it is a place that has interpersonal, cultural, media, and political communication. Henson and Denker said, "Because classroom interactions and societal discourse are mutually influential, instructors and students bring their own biases and cultural perspectives into the classroom."

The study researched whether there was a correlation between students' perception that they were being politically silenced and their perceived differences in student-instructor political affiliation. The study also questioned whether there was any connection between the perceived climate and the similarity of the student and instructor on their political affiliations. The researchers used participants from a Midwestern university's communication courses. The students answered a survey over their perceptions of political silencing, classroom climate, and the climate created by the instructor. The results of this research found that there is a positive relationship of the perceived similarities in a political party and ideological differences of the student and instructor to perceived greater political silencing.

=== In computer-mediated communication ===
While the studies regarding the spiral of silence theory focused on face-to-face interaction before 2000, the theory was later applied to a computer-mediated communication environment. The first study in this context analyzed communication behaviors in online chat rooms regarding the issue of abortion, and revealed that minority opinion holders were more likely to speak out, whereas their comments remained neutral. Another study focused on the Korean bulletin board postings regarding the national election, and found a relationship between online postings and the presentation of candidates in the mainstream media. The third study focuses on the online review system, suggesting that the fear of isolation tend to reduce the willingness of members to voice neutral and negative reviews. The spiral of silence theory is extended "into the context of non-anonymous multichannel communication platforms" and "the need to consider the role of communicative affordances in online opinion expression" is also addressed.

== The rising influence of the internet and social media ==
=== Isolating the factors that remove isolation ===
The concept of isolation has a variety of definitions, dependent upon the circumstances it is investigated in. In one instance the problem of isolation has been defined as social withdrawal, defined as low relative frequencies of peer interaction. Other researchers have defined isolation as low levels of peer acceptance or high levels of peer rejection. Research that considers isolation with regard to the Internet either focuses on how the Internet makes individuals more isolated from society by cutting off their contact from live human beings or how the Internet decreases social isolation of people by allowing them to expand their social networks and giving them more means to stay in touch with friends and family. Since the development of the Internet, and in particular the World Wide Web, a wide variety of groups have come into existence, including Web and Internet Relay Chat (IRC), newsgroups, multiuser dimensions (MUDs), and, more recently, commercial virtual communities. The theories and hypotheses about how Internet-based groups impact individuals are numerous and wide-ranging. Some researchers view these fast growing virtual chat cliques, online games, or computer-based marketplaces as a new opportunity, particularly for stigmatized people, to take a more active part in social life.

Traditionally, social isolation has been presented as a one-dimensional construct organized around the notion of a person's position outside the peer group and refers to isolation from the group as a result of being excluded from the group by peers. From children to adults, literature shows that people understand the concept of isolation and fear the repercussions of being isolated from groups of which they are a member. Fearing isolation, people did not feel free to speak up if they feel they hold dissenting views, which means people restrict themselves to having conversation with like-minded individuals, or have no conversation whatsoever. Witschge further explained, "Whether it is fear of harming others, or fear to get harmed oneself, there are factors that inhibit people from speaking freely, and which thus results in a non-ideal type of discussion, as it hinders diversity and equality of participants and viewpoints to arise fully."

The medium of the Internet has the power to free people from the fear of social isolation, and in doing so, shuts down the spiral of silence. One article demonstrates that social media can weaken the fear of isolation. The research shows that the vocal minority who hold racist viewpoints are willing to express unpopular views on Facebook. The Internet allows people to find a place where they can find groups of people with like mindsets and similar points of view. Van Alstyne and Brynjolfsson stated that "Internet users can seek out interactions with like-minded individuals who have similar values, and thus become less likely to trust important decisions to people whose values differ from their own." The features of the Internet could not only bring about more people to deliberate by freeing people of psychological barriers, but also bring new possibilities in that it "makes manageable large-scale, many-to-many discussion and deliberation." Unlike traditional media that limit participation, the Internet brings the characteristics of empowerment, enormous scales of available information, specific audiences can be targeted effectively and people can be brought together through the medium.

=== Online versus offline ===
The Internet is a place where many reference and social groups are available with similar views. It has become a place where it appears that people have less of a fear of isolation. One research article examined individuals' willingness to speak their opinion online and offline. Through survey results from 305 participants, a comparison and contrast of online and offline spiral of silence behaviors was determined. Liu and Fahmy stated that "it is easy to quit from an online discussion without the pressure of complying with the majority group." This is not to say that a spiral of silence does not occur in an online environment. People are still less likely to speak out, even in an online setting, when there is a dominant opinion that differs from their own. But people in the online environment will speak up if someone has a reference group that speaks up for them.

Another study asked people if they would be willing to speak up in a group talking face to face, and in an online chat room. Face to face, people who were afraid of being left out spoke up a lot less. In the chat room, that gap almost went away.

Online, the presence of one person who encourages a minority point of view can put an end to a spiral of silence. Studies of the spiral of silence in online behavior have not acknowledged that a person may be more likely to speak out against dominant views offline as well. The person might have characteristics that make them comfortable speaking out against dominant views offline, which make them just as comfortable speaking out in an online setting.

Although research suggests that people will disclose their opinions more often in an online setting, silencing of views can still occur. Another research article examined the influence of different opinion climates in online forums (opinion congruence with the majority of forum participants vs. website source) and found personal opinion congruence was more influential than the online site in which the forum is situated in. Nekmat and Gonzenbach said it might be worth researching whether the factors in these studies or other factors cause people to be more comfortable when it comes to speaking their mind while online.

=== Heterogeneity and anonymity ===
The nature of the Internet facilitates not only the participation of more people, but also a more heterogeneous group of people. Page stated, "The onward rush of electronic communications technology will presumably increase the diversity of available ideas and the speed and ease with which they fly about and compete with each other." The reason people engage in deliberations is because of their differences, and the Internet allows differences to be easily found. The Internet seems the perfect place to find different views of a very diverse group of people who are at the same time open to such difference and disagreement needed for deliberation. Noelle-Neumann's initial idea of cowering and muted citizens is difficult to reconcile with empirical studies documenting uninhibited discussion in computer-mediated contexts such as chat rooms and newsgroups.

The Internet provides an anonymous setting, and it can be argued that in an anonymous setting, fears of isolation and humiliation would be reduced. Wallace recognized that when people believe their actions cannot be attributed to them personally, they tend to become less inhibited by social conventions and restraints. This can be very positive, particularly when people are offered the opportunity to discuss difficult personal issues under conditions in which they feel safer.

The groups' ability to taunt an individual is lessened on the Internet, thus reducing the tendency to conform. Wallace goes on to summarize a number of empirical studies that do find that dissenters feel more liberated to express their views online than offline, which might result from the fact that the person in the minority would not have to endure taunts or ridicule from people that are making up the majority, or be made to feel uncomfortable for having a different opinion. Stromer-Galley considered that "an absence of non-verbal cues, which leads to a lowered sense of social presence, and a heightened sense of anonymity" frees people from the psychological barriers that keep them from engaging in a face-to-face deliberation.

The crux of the spiral of silence is that people believe consciously or subconsciously that the expression of unpopular opinions will lead to negative repercussions. These beliefs may not exist on the Internet for several reasons. First, embarrassment and humiliation depends on the physical presence of others. In computer-mediated communication, physical isolation often already exists and poses no further threat. Second, a great deal of normative influence is communicated through nonverbal cues, such as eye contact and gestures, but computer-mediated communication typically precludes many of these cues. Third, Kiesler, Siegel, and McQuire observe that nonverbal social context cues convey formality and status inequality in face-to-face communication. When these cues are removed, the importance of social status as a source of influence recedes. Group hierarchies that develop in face-to-face interaction emerge less clearly in a mediated environment. The form and consequences of conformity influence should undergo significant changes given the interposition of a medium that reduces the social presence of participants. Social presence is defined as the degree of salience of the other person in the interaction or the degree to which the medium conveys some of the person's presence.

=== Equality ===
An important issue in obtaining heterogeneity in conversation is equal access for all the participants and equal opportunities to influence in the discussion. When people believe they are ignorant about a topic, incapable to participate in a discussion or not equal to their peers, they tend to not even become involved in a deliberation. When people do decide to participate, their participation might be overruled by dominant others, or their contribution might be valued less or more, depending on their status. Dahlberg praises the Internet for its possibility to liberate people from the social hierarchies and power relations that exist offline: "The 'blindness' of cyberspace to bodily identity... [is supposed to allow] people to interact as if they were equals. Arguments are said to be assessed by the value of the claims themselves and not the social position of the poster".

Gastil sees this feature as one of the strongest points of the Internet: "if computer-mediated interaction can consistently reduce the independent influence of status, it will have a powerful advantage over face-to-face deliberation". While status cues are difficult to detect, perceptions about the status converge, and this lessens stereotyping and prejudice.

It may be that people do feel more equal in online forums than they feel offline. Racism, ageism, and other kinds of discrimination against out groups "seems to be diminishing because the cues to out-group status are not as obvious". Next to this, the Internet has rapidly and dramatically increased the capacities to develop, share and organize information, realizing more equality of access to information.

== Methodological research approaches ==
The relationship between the perception of public opinion and willingness to speak-up is mainly measured through surveys. Surveys respondents are often asked whether they would reveal their opinions given a hypothetical situation, right after their opinions about the public opinion and their opinion is received. Whether asking hypothetical questions can reflect real life cases was questioned by some communication scholars, leading to a criticism of this methodology as not being able to capture what the respondent would do in a real-life situation. A research study addressed this criticism by comparatively testing a spiral model both in a hypothetical survey and in a focus group. The findings are in line with the critic of hypothetical survey questions, demonstrating a significant increase in the spiral of silence in focus groups.

In her original research, Noelle-Neumann measured willingness to speak up by asking people to picture a long train ride and say whether they would join a conversation with fellow passengers about a controversial issue. These questions were part of larger opinion polls run by the Allensbach institute in West Germany, mostly in 1971 and 1972. Each poll involved 1,000 to 2,000 interviews with people chosen to represent the population. She also found that willingness to join these discussions was higher among men, younger people, and people in the middle and upper classes.

Among different approaches to survey methodology, cross-sectional study design is the leading method employed to analyze and test the theory. Cross-sectional design involves the analysis of the relationship between public opinion and willingness to speak at one point in time.

While many of the researchers employ cross-sectional design, some scholars employed panel data. Under this methodology, three specific approaches have been used. Noelle-Neumann herself tested the theory from the aggregate level. Using this approach, the change process is "observed by comparing the absolute share of people perceiving a majority climate with people willing to express their views over time." The second approach that has been used in spiral of silence research is conducting separate regressions for each panel survey wave. The drawback for this approach is that the individual change of climate and opinions perception is ignored. The last approach a few scholars used in conducting spiral of silence researches is to use changed scores as dependent variables. However, as intuitive as this approach may be, it "leads to well-documented difficulties with respect to statistical properties, such as regression to the mean or the negative correlation of the change score with the time one state".

== Criticisms ==
The critics of this theory most often claim that individuals have different influences that affect whether they speak out or not.

Research indicates that people fear isolation in their small social circles more than they do in the population at large. Within a large nation, one can always find a group of people who share one's opinions, however people fear isolation from their close family and friends more in theory. Research has demonstrated that this fear of isolation is stronger than the fear of being isolated from the entire public, as it is typically measured.

Scholars have argued that both personal characteristics and various cultures among different groups will have influences on whether a person will willingly speak out. If one person "has a positive self-concept and lacks a sense of shame, that person will speak out regardless of how she or he perceives the climate of public opinion." A 2008 study found that how nervous people feel about speaking in general was linked to speaking up even more strongly than fear of being left out. People who were more nervous about talking were less willing to share their opinions. Another influence critics give for people choosing not to speak out against public opinion is culture. Some cultures are more individualistic, which would support more of an individual's own opinion, while collectivist cultures support the overall group's opinion and needs. Gender can be also considered as a cultural factor. In some cultures, women's "perception of language, not public opinion, forces them to remain quiet." Scheufele & Moy, further assert that certain conflict styles and cultural indicators should be used to understand these differences.

The nature of issues will influence the dynamic processes of the spiral of silence. Yeric and Todd present three issues type, including enduring issues that will be discussed by the public for a long time; emerging issues that are new to the public but have the potential to become enduring issues; and the transitory issues, which don't stay in the public consciousness for very long but come up from time to time. The research suggests that issues difference affects people's willingness to express. Facebook users are more likely to post their real thoughts on emerging issues such as gay marriage in an incongruent opinion climate.

Another criticism of the spiral of silence research is that the research designs do not observe the movement in the spiral over time. Critics propose that Noelle-Neumann's emphasis on time in the formation of the spiral should reflect on the methodology as well, and the dynamic nature of the spiral model should be acknowledged. They argue that the spiral of silence theory involves a "time factor", considering that the changes in public opinion eventually lead to change in people's assessments of the public opinion. Also, according to Spilchal, the spiral of silence theory "ignores the evidence of the historical development of public opinion, both in theory and practice, through the extension of suffrage, organisation of political propaganda groups, the establishment of pressure groups and political parties, the eligibility of ever wider circles of public officials and, eventually, the installation of several forms of direct democracy."

Some scholars also provide understandings of the theory in the contemporary society by pointing out that "it is not so much the actual statistical majority that generates pressure for conformity as it is the climate of opinion conveyed in large measure by the media." Under the great influence by the media coverage, the climate of opinion "is not invariably an accurate reflection of the distribution of opinions within the polity."

Further, Scheufele & Moy find problems in the operationalization of key terms, including willingness to speak out. This construct should be measured in terms of actually speaking out, not voting or other conceptually similar constructs. Conformity experiments have no moral component, yet morality is a key construct in the model. These conformity experiments, particularly those by Asch, form part of the base of the theory. Scholars question whether these conformity experiments are relevant to the development of the spiral of silence.

=== False dilemmas and silence of consistency ===
While the existence of groups with opinions other than those that are supposed to be dominant in a society provide a space for some people to express seemingly unpopular opinions, assumptions in such groups that criticism of their underrepresented opinion equates to support for society's mainstream views is a source of false dilemmas.

Some research indicates that such false dilemmas, especially when there are inconsistencies both in mainstream views and in organized opposition views, causes a spiral of silence that specifically silences logically consistent third, fourth or higher number viewpoint criticism.

== See also ==
- Abilene paradox – False consensus due to communication failure
- Bandwagon effect – Societal phenomenon
- Blue wall of silence – Informal rule that American police do not report misconduct by other officers
- Bradley effect – White candidate bias in voter opinion polls
- Bystander effect – Social psychological theory
- Chilling effect – Discouragement of exercising rights by threats of legal sanctions
- Collective behavior – Sociological theory
- Communal reinforcement – Social phenomenon
- Conformity – Matching opinions and behaviors to group norms
- Conspiracy of silence (expression) – "Culture of silence"
- Groupthink – Psychological phenomenon that occurs within a group of people
- Knowledge falsification – Deliberate misrepresentation of knowledge
- Memory hole – Fictional device in Nineteen Eighty-Four
- Opinion corridor – Theory of legitimate public discourse
- Overton window – Range of ideas tolerated in public discourse
- Pact of forgetting – Political decision in Spain to intentionally ignore the political legacy of Franco
- Pluralistic ignorance – Incorrect perception of others' beliefs
- Preference falsification – Stating a preference not truly held
- Purity spiral – Social feedback loop leading to extremism
- Silent majority – Concept in politics
- Third rail of politics – Metaphor for "untouchable" issues

== Notes ==
=== Bibliography ===
- van Alstyne, M; Brynjolfsson, E (1996), Electronic communities: Global village or cyberbalkans? (paper), Cleveland, OH: International Conference on Information Systems.
- Anderson, JA (1996), Communication theory: epistemological foundations, New York: Guilford.
- Bradley, N; Poppen, W (2003), "Assistive technology, computers and Internet may decrease sense of isolation for homebound elderly and disabled persons", Technology and Disability, 15 (1): 19–25, doi:10.3233/TAD-2003-15104.
- Bowker, A; Bukowski, W; Zargarpour, S; Hoza, B (1998), "A Structural and Functional Analysis of a Two-Dimensional Model of Social Isolation", Merrill-Palmer Quarterly, 44 (4): 447–463, JSTOR 23093748.
- Burgoon, JK; Buller, DB; Woodall, WG (1989), Nonverbal communication: The unspoken dialogue, New York: Harper & Row.
- Chaudhry, I; Gruzd, A (January 2019). "Expressing and Challenging Racist Discourse on Facebook: How Social Media Weaken the "Spiral of Silence" Theory". Policy & Internet. 12 (1): 88–108. doi:10.1002/poi3.197. ISSN 1944-2866. S2CID 149913905.
- Coleman, S; Gøtze, J (2001), Bowling together: Online public engagement in policy deliberation (PDF), archived from the original (PDF) on 2008-09-16.
- Cummings, J; Sproull, L; Kiesler, SB (2002), "Beyond hearing: Where real-world and online support meet", Group Dynamics: Theory, Research, and Practice, 6 (1): 78–88, doi:10.1037/1089-2699.6.1.78, S2CID 6261146.
- Dahlberg, L (2001), "The Internet and democratic discourse", Information, Communication & Society, 4 (4): 615–633, doi:10.1080/13691180110097030, S2CID 14492825.
- Gastil, J (2000), "Is face-to-face citizen deliberation a luxury or a necessity?", Political Communication, 14 (4): 357–361, doi:10.1080/10584600050178960, S2CID 59330356, SSRN 2756738.
- Gimmler, A (2001), "Deliberative democracy, the public sphere and the Internet", Philosophy and Social Criticism, 27 (4): 357–361, doi:10.1177/019145370102700402, S2CID 145524757.
- Gonzenbach, WJ; King, C; Jablonski, P (1999), "Homosexuals and the military: an analysis of the spiral of silence", Howard Journal of Communication, 10 (4): 281–296, doi:10.1080/106461799246762.
- ———; Stevenson, RL (1994), "Children with AIDS attending public school: an analysis of the spiral of silence", Political Communication, 1: 3–18, doi:10.1080/10584609.1994.9963007.
- Gottman, J; Gonso, J; Rasmussen, B (1975), "Social interaction, social competence, and friendship in children", Child Development, 46 (3): 709–718, doi:10.2307/1128569, JSTOR 1128569, PMID 1098878.
- Griffen, EM (2009), A first look at communication theory (7th ed.), New York: McGraw Hill.
- Hayes, AF; Glynn, CJ; Shanahan, J (2005a), "Willingness to self-censor: A construct and measurement tool for public opinion research", International Journal of Public Opinion Research, 17 (3): 298–323, doi:10.1093/ijpor/edh073.
- ———; ———; ——— (2005b), "Validating the willingness to self-censor scale: Individual differences in the effect of the climate of opinion on opinion expression", International Journal of Public Opinion Research, 17 (4): 443–455, doi:10.1093/ijpor/edh072.
- Henson, J; Denker, K (2007), "I'm a Republican, but please don't tell: an application of spiral of silence theory to perceptions of classroom climate", Conference Papers, 1, National Communication Association.
- Hiltz, SR; Johnson, K; Turoff, M (1986), "Experiments in group decision making: Communication process and outcome in face-to-face versus computerized conferences", Human Communication Research, 13 (2): 225–252, doi:10.1111/j.1468-2958.1986.tb00104.x.
- Huang, Huiping (2005), "A Cross-Cultural Test of the Spiral of Silence", International Journal of Public Opinion Research, 17 (3): 1–25, doi:10.1093/ijpor/edh065.
- Kant, I (1781), Critique of Pure Reason
- Kiesler, S; Siegel, J; McQuire, TW (1984), "Social psychological aspects of computer-mediated communication", American Psychologist, 39 (10): 1123–1134, doi:10.1037/0003-066x.39.10.1123, S2CID 3896692.
- Kraut, RE; Patterson, M; Lundmark, V; Kiesler, S; Mukhopadhyay, T; Scherlis, W (1998), "Internet paradox: A social technology that reduces social involvement and psychological well-being?", American Psychologist, 53 (9): 1017–1032, Bibcode:1998AmPsy..53.1017K, doi:10.1037/0003-066x.53.9.1017, PMID 9841579, S2CID 513632.
- Liu, X; Fahmy, S (2009), Testing the spiral of silence in the virtual world: Monitoring opinion-climate online and individuals' willingness to express personal opinions in online versus offline settings (conference paper), vol. 1, International Communication Association, p. 36.
- McDevitt, M; Kiousis, S; Wahl-Jorgensen, K (2003), "Spiral of moderation: Opinion expression in computer-mediated discussion", International Journal of Public Opinion Research, 15 (4): 454–470, doi:10.1093/ijpor/15.4.454.
- McKenna, KYA; Bargh, JA (1998), "Coming out in the age of the Internet: Identity "demarginalization" through virtual group participation", Journal of Personality and Social Psychology, 75 (3): 681–694, doi:10.1037/0022-3514.75.3.681.
- Miller, K (2005), Communication theories: perspectives, processes, and contexts (2nd ed.), New York: McGraw-Hill.
- Moody, EJ (2001), "Internet use and its relationship to loneliness", CyberPsychology & Behavior, 4 (3): 393–401, doi:10.1089/109493101300210303, PMID 11710265.
- Morris, M; Ogan, C (2002), McQauil, D (ed.), "The internet as mass medium", Reader in Mass Communication Theory, London: Sage.
- Moy, P; Domke, D; Stamm, K (2001), "The spiral of silence and public opinion on affirmative action", Journalism and Mass Communication Quarterly, 78 (1): 7–25, doi:10.1177/107769900107800102, S2CID 145442734.
- Neill, S (May 2009), "The Alternate Channel: How Social Media is Challenging the Spiral of Silence Theory in GLBT Communities of Color" (PDF), American University, Washington, DC, archived from the original (PDF) on 2011-06-29
- Nekmat, E; Gonzenbach, WJ (2013). "Multiple Opinion Climates in Online Forums: Role of Website Source Reference and Within-Forum Opinion Congruency". Journalism & Mass Communication Quarterly. 90 (4): 736–756. doi:10.1177/1077699013503162. ISSN 1077-6990. S2CID 144747317.
- Noelle-Neumann, E (1974), "The spiral of silence: a theory of public opinion", Journal of Communication, 24 (2): 43–51, doi:10.1111/j.1460-2466.1974.tb00367.x, S2CID 59515037.
- ——— (1977), "Turbulences in the climate of opinion: Methodological applications of the spiral of silence theory", Public Opinion Quarterly, 41 (2): 143–158, doi:10.1086/268371.
- ——— (1984). The spiral of silence: Public opinion, our social skin. Chicago: University of Chicago Press. ISBN 978-0-226-58932-9.
- ——— (1993). The spiral of silence: Public opinion, our social skin. Chicago: University of Chicago Press.
- O'Connor, RD (1969), "Modification of social withdrawal through symbolic modeling", Journal of Applied Behavior Analysis, 2 (1): 15–22, doi:10.1901/jaba.1969.2-15, PMC 1311030, PMID 16795196.
- ——— (1972), "Relative efficacy of modeling, shaping, and the combined procedures for modification of social withdrawal", Journal of Abnormal Psychology, 79 (3): 327–334, doi:10.1037/h0033226, PMID 5033375, S2CID 15753273.
- O'Hara, K (2002), "The Internet: A tool for democratic pluralism?", Science as Culture, 11 (2): 287–298, doi:10.1080/09505430220137298, S2CID 145160626.
- O'Sullivan, PB (1995), "Computer networks and political participation: Santa Monica's teledemocracy project", Applied Communication Research, 23 (2): 93–107, doi:10.1080/00909889509365417.
- Page, BI (1996), Who deliberates? Mass Media in Modern Democracy, Chicago: University of Chicago Press.
- Rheingold, H (1993), The virtual community. Homesteading on the electronic frontier, Reading.
- Rice, RE; Williams, F (1984), "Theories old and new: The study of new media", in Rice, RE (ed.), The new media: Communication, research, and technology, Beverly Hills, CA: Sage, pp. 55–80.
- Ross, C (2007), Considering and communicating more world views: New directions for the spiral of silence (conference papers), vol. 1, National Communication Association.
- Sassenberg, K (2002), "Common bond and common identity groups on the Internet: Attachment and normative behaviors in on-topic and off-topic chats", Group Dynamics: Theory, Research, and Practice, 6 (1): 27–37, doi:10.1037/1089-2699.6.1.27.
- Scheufele, DA; Moy, P (2000), "Twenty-five years of the spiral of silence: A conceptual review and empirical outlook", International Journal of Public Opinion Research, 12 (1): 3–28, doi:10.1093/ijpor/12.1.3, ISSN 0954-2892.
- ——— (2007), "Opinion climates, spirals of silence, and biotechnology: Public opinion as a heuristic for scientific decision making", in Brossard, D; Shanahan, J; Nesbit, TC (eds.), The public, the media, and agricultural biotechnology: An international casebook, Cambridge, MA: Oxford University Press, pp. 231–241
- Schmierback, M; Boyle, MP; McLeod, DM (2005), "Civic attachment in the aftermath of September 11", Mass Communication and Society, 8 (4): 323–346, doi:10.1207/s15327825mcs0804_3, S2CID 144959301.
- Shanahan, J; Scheufele, DA; Yang, Fang; Hizi, S (2004), "Cultivation and spiral of silence effects:the case of smoking", Mass Communication and Society, 7 (4): 413–428, doi:10.1207/s15327825mcs0704_3, S2CID 143645965.
- Short, J; Williams, E; Christie, B (1976), The social psychology of telecommunications, New York: John Wiley & Sons.
- Sleek, S (1998), "Isolation increases with Internet use", APA Monitor, 29 (1): 1.
- Spencer, A; Stephen, C (2008), "Basque Nationalism and the Spiral of Silence", International Communication Gazette, 70 (2): 137–153, doi:10.1177/1748048507086909, S2CID 145761544.
- Sproull, L; Kiesler, S (1992), Connections: New ways of working in the networked organization, Cambridge, MA: MIT Press.
- Stromer-Galley, J (2002), "New voices in the political sphere: A comparative analysis of interpersonal and online political talk", Javnost/The Public, 9 (2): 23–42, doi:10.1080/13183222.2002.11008798, S2CID 143901249.
- Wallace, P (1999), The psychology of the Internet, Cambridge, MA: Cambridge University Press.
- Wanta, W; Dimitrova, D (2000), Chatrooms and the spiral of silence: An examination of online discussions during the final 1996 U.S. presidential debate (paper), Acapulco, MX: The International Communication Association.
- Warren, ME (2001), "What should we expect from more democracy? Radically democratic responses to politics", Political Theory, 24 (2): 241–270, doi:10.1177/0090591796024002004, S2CID 143324483.
- Williams, E (1977), "Experimental comparison of face-to-face and mediated communication: A review", Psychological Bulletin, 84 (5): 963–976, doi:10.1037/0033-2909.84.5.963.
- Witschge, T (2002), Online Deliberation: Possibilities of the Internet for deliberative democracy (paper), Nijmegen, NL: The Euricom Colloquium Electronic Networks & Democratic Engagement.
