= Peter Lynn (statistician) =

British statistician and Professor

Peter Lynn FAcSS
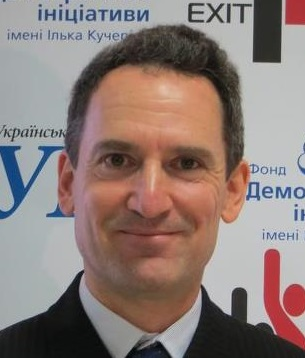
- Lynn at a press briefing in 2012
- Born: Weymouth, United Kingdom
- Education: University College London; Sheffield Hallam University; University of Essex
- Known for: Survey Methodology
- Awards: Guy Medal (Bronze, 2003)
- Scientific career
- Fields: Statistics
- Workplaces: University of Essex

Peter Lynn FAcSS is a British statistician and professor at the University of Essex. Lynn was previously director of the Institute for Social and Economic Research (2020-2023) and has held the positions of Vice-President (2009-2011) and President (2017-2019) of the International Association of Survey Statisticians. He is well known for his work on survey design and implementation methods, particularly for longitudinal social surveys, including pioneering work on targeted methods to address survey nonresponse.

== Early life ==
Lynn was educated at Crookhorn Comprehensive School and Havant Sixth Form College, before studying statistics, computing and economics at University College, London. He graduated in 1987 with an upper second class Bachelor of Science (BSc) degree. Later, he gained a master's degree in applied statistics from Sheffield Hallam University and Doctor of Philosophy degree from the University of Essex with a thesis entitled Improving the quality of social survey data: a collection of published papers.

== Career ==
Upon graduation, Lynn joined the National Centre for Social Research as a survey researcher. In 1994 he was promoted to research director and was, for several years, director of the Scottish School Leavers Survey series, carried out for the Scottish Government. In 1998, he became director of the Survey Methods Centre, a position held for three years before moving to the University of Essex as Professor of Survey Methodology. In 2020, Lynn became director of the Institute for Social and Economic Research.

Lynn headed up the ESRC-funded UK Survey Resources Network from 2008 to 2011 and since 2023 he has been Director of Survey Futures, a sector-wide collaboration to secure the future of social survey data collection in the UK.

In 2004, with Willem Saris, Lynn co-founded the European Survey Research Association and also founded its journal, Survey Research Methods, of which he became the first Editor-in-Chief. He has been involved since its inception in the European Social Survey, having served (1997-1999) on the European Science Foundation methodology committee to develop a blueprint for the survey. Lynn was subsequently a member of the sampling expert panel, the methodology committee and, since 2017, a member of the Core Scientific Team as Chair of the sampling and weighting expert panel.

He has served on various committees, including the National Statistics Methodology Advisory Committee, the Department for Business, Innovation and Skills Expert Review Group on Evaluation, the Ministry of Justice Court Reform Advisory Panel, and the Economic and Social Research Council (ESRC) Expert Advisory Group for Data Infrastructure, Skills and Methods. He is currently an advisor to the United Nations Statistics Division on household survey methods. He served as Editor of the Journal of the Royal Statistical Society Series A (Statistics in Society) from 2002 to 2005 and as associate editor of the Statistics Canada journal Survey Methodology from 2010 to 2015.

In 2017, he was elected president of the International Association of Survey Statisticians, having earlier served two-year terms as vice-president and president-elect.

== Work ==
=== Sample design ===
One of Lynn's main areas of research has been in the field of sample design for social surveys. An early paper compared the statistical properties of the electoral registers, the main sampling frame used for general population surveys in the UK, with those of the Postcode Address File (PAF), a new database produced by the Royal Mail. The conclusion was that the PAF had considerable advantages and this prompted most UK surveys to switch to the PAF. Another influential paper, co-authored with Gerry Nicolaas, assessed the use of random digit dialling – a popular sampling method in the USA - and concluded that it was unsuitable for use in the UK. Other contributions on sampling have addressed practical methods to select a sample design based on empirical prediction, sample designs to achieve equivalence in cross-national surveys, definitions of representativeness, and allocation to sampling strata for adaptive survey designs.

=== Survey nonresponse ===
Lynn has made major contributions to the understanding of the nature of survey nonresponse, and to the development of methods to reduce it.

=== Data collection modes ===
A third theme to Lynn’s research corpus is optimal choice of modes of data collection. In the 1990s he contributed to assessment of the emerging method of computer-assisted personal interviewing (CAPI). He subsequently investigated ways of combining personal and telephone interviewing, and later contributed to the development of ways to effectively combine web data collection with personal interviews.

== Honours ==
In 2003, Lynn was awarded the Royal Statistical Society Guy Medal for services to social surveys. In 2017, he was elected a Fellow of the Academy of Social Sciences. He was the 2026 winner of the Harvey Goldstein Memorial Award for his significant contribution in advancing methodologies for life course studies.

== Selected works ==
- Lynn, Peter, ed. (2009). Methodology of Longitudinal Surveys. Wiley. ISBN 9-7804-7001-8712.
- Engel, Uwe; Jann, Ben; Lynn, Peter; Scherpenzeel, Annette; Sturgis, Patrick (2014). Improving Survey Methods: Lessons from recent research. Routledge/ Psychology Press. ISBN 9-7804-1581-7622.
- Lynn, Peter, ed. (2021). Advances in Longitudinal Survey Methodology. Wiley. ISBN 978-1-119-37695-8.
- Lynn, Peter; Lyberg, Lars (2022). Improving the Measurement of Poverty and Social Exclusion in Europe: Reducing Nonsampling Errors. EU Publications. ISBN 978-92-76-43001-8.

Academic offices
Preceded by Steve Heeringa	President of the International Association of Survey Statisticians; 2017–2019	Succeeded by Denise Silva
