= Phillip Kott =

American statistician (born 1952)

Phillip S. Kott
- Education: Brown University; State University of New York
- Scientific career
- Fields: statistics
- Workplaces: Research Triangle Institute
- Doctoral advisor: Ryuzo Sato

Phillip S. Kott (born 1952) is an American statistician. He has worked in the field of survey statistics since 1984, and is regarded as a leader in this field. His areas of expertise include survey sampling design, analysis of survey data, and calibration weighting, among other areas. He revolutionized sampling design and estimation strategies with the Agricultural Resource Management Survey, which uses survey information more efficiently. He has taught at George Mason University, and USDA Graduate School. For many years, he served as an Associate Editor for the Journal of Official Statistics and the scientific journal Survey Methodology.

== Early professional years ==
Phillip Kott earned his BS in Mathematics from the State University of New York at Stony Brook in 1974. In 1975, Kott received his MA in Economics from Brown University. In 1978, Kott received his PhD in Mathematical Economics from Brown University at age 26. He was recruited as an economist by the Bureau of Labor Statistics in November 1978 and worked there until 1984 when he was hired by U.S. Energy Information Administration (EIA). In 1987, Kott began working for the National Agricultural Statistics Service of USDA, where he remained until 2008; he briefly worked at the Census Bureau in 1990.

== Current professional activities ==
At the time of his retirement in 2008, Kott was the chief research statistician at NASS. He continued to work part-time at NASS through December 2010. From 2009 to 2024, Kott served as a senior research statistician at Research Triangle Institute (RTI).

== Notable achievements ==
In 1996, Dr. Kott was elected a Fellow of ASA. Kott has been an organizer of numerous conferences and sessions at national and international statistical organizations. He has also served as a representative to the Council of Chapters of ASA. He served as the president of the Washington Statistical Society from June 1996 to June 1997. In 1997, Kott was awarded the Distinguished Achievement Medal by American Statistical Association's Section on Statistics and the Environment. More recently, Kott received the Presidential Rank Award in 2007.

In 2017, Kott earned the NISS Distinguished Service Award for his "extraordinary service that advances NISS and its mission".

In 2021, Kott was inducted into the National Agricultural Statistics Service Hall of Fame, which recognizes "the talent, vision, and energy of individuals whose contributions to the agency and to agriculture statistics transcend time. Individuals honored in the Hall of Fame exemplified integrity, honesty, innovation, positive impact on NASS, and commitment to public service."

== Select bibliography ==
=== Books edited ===
Kott was a co-editor of Business Survey Methods (1995), a collection of papers from diverse researchers regarding the process of conducting statistical surveys.

=== Papers published ===
Kott has written or collaborated on hundreds of papers advancing the science of survey methodology. The following are five of Kott's most influential and important published papers:

- Kott, P., & Chang, T. (2010). Using calibration weighting to adjust for nonignorable unit nonresponse. Journal of the American Statistical Association, 105, 1265-1275.
- Kott, P., & Liu, Y. (2009). One-sided coverage intervals for a proportion estimated from a stratified simple random sample. International Statistical Review, 77, 251–265.
- Kott, P. (2006). Using calibration weighting to adjust for nonresponse and coverage errors. Survey Methodology, 133–142
- Kott, P. (2001). The delete-a-group jackknife. Journal of Official Statistics, 521–526.
- Kott, P., & Stukel, D. (1997). Can the jackknife be used with a two-phase sample? Survey Methodology, 81–89
