= Elisabeth Noelle-Neumann =

German political scientist (1916–2010)

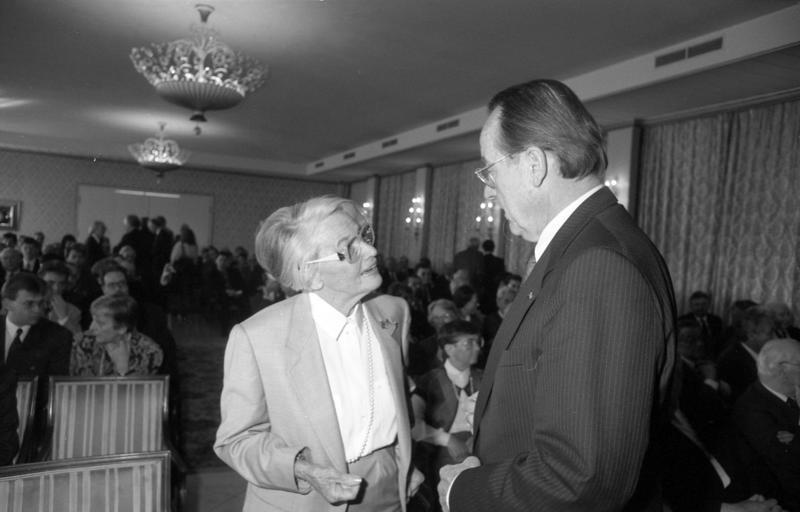
- Noelle-Neumann and Otto Schlecht at the Ludwig Erhard Foundation in 1991
- Born: 19 December 1916; Dahlem, Kingdom of Prussia, German Empire
- Died: 25 March 2010 (aged 93); Allensbach, Germany
- Education: Friedrich-Wilhelms-Universität; University of Missouri
- Known for: Spiral of silence, Institut für Demoskopie Allensbach
- Awards: Great Cross of Merit (1976); Alexander Rüstow Medal (1978); Baden-Württemberg's Medal of Merit (1990); Helen Dinerman Award (issued by WAPOR; 1990); Gerhard Löwenthal Honor Award (issued by Junge Freiheit; 2006)
- Scientific career
- Fields: Political science
- Doctoral advisor: Emil Dovifat

Elisabeth Noelle-Neumann (19 December 1916 – 25 March 2010) was a German political scientist. Her most famous contribution is the model of the spiral of silence, detailed in The Spiral of Silence: Public Opinion – Our Social Skin. The model is an explanation of how perceived public opinion can influence individual opinions or actions.

== Biography ==
Elisabeth Noelle was born to Ernst and Eve Noelle in 1916 in the Villa Noelle in Grunewald, a suburb of Berlin. First Elisabeth went to several schools in Berlin and then switched to the prestigious Salem Castle School, which she also left one year later. She earned her Abitur in 1935 in Göttingen and then studied philosophy, history, journalism, and American studies at the Friedrich Wilhelm University, and the Königsberg Albertina University. When she visited Obersalzberg on 13 June 1937 with 23 other students, she by chance had an encounter with Adolf Hitler, which she later called "one of the most intensive and strangest experiences in her life". As can be read in a newspaper article in the Nazi student newspaper Die Bewegung, a group of ANSt students travelled to the Obersalzberg to see Hitler and felt lucky when they were actually received and even invited for coffee. The doctoral student Petra Umlauf also came to this conclusion in her dissertation "Die Studentinnen der Universität München 1926 to 1945". The group photo shows an enthusiastic and friendly looking Elisabeth Noelle directly behind Adolf Hitler. She stayed in the US from 1937 to 1938 and studied at the University of Missouri. There she was registered as a "special student". Elisabeth Noelle-Neumann claimed countless times that she studied journalism for one year. But "special students" were not admitted to the Schools of Journalism, Law, or Medicine.

In 1940, she received her PhD in Berlin/Germany, concentrating on public opinion research in the USA.

In 1940, she briefly worked for the Nazi newspaper Das Reich. On 8 June 1941 Das Reich published Noelle-Neumann's article entitled "Who Informs America?" in which she propagated the idea that a Jewish syndicate ran the American media. She wrote, "Jews write in the papers, own them, have virtually monopolize the advertising agencies and can therefore open and shut the gates of advertising income as they wish." She was fired when she exchanged unfavourable photos of Franklin D. Roosevelt for better-looking ones. She then worked for the Frankfurter Zeitung until it was banned in 1943.

In 1947, she and her first husband Erich Peter Neumann founded a public opinion research organization—the Institut für Demoskopie Allensbach, which today is one of the best known and most prestigious polling organizations in Germany. She, along with her husband, created the first German opinion-polling body.

From 1964 to 1983 she held a professorate at the Johannes Gutenberg University of Mainz.

Noelle-Neumann was the president of the World Association for Public Opinion Research from 1978 to 1980 and worked as a guest professor at the University of Chicago from 1978 to 1991.

== Notable work ==
Elisabeth Noelle-Neumann coined the term spiral of silence. This theory, laid out in her 1984 book The Spiral of Silence, seeks to explain how people's opinions change or go unspoken to fit in with popular ideologies and avoid being singled out for holding opposing ideologies. The top of the spiral is those who express their opinions and thoughts, while those who are unwilling to speak out for fear of being isolated or ostracised are at the bottom of the spiral.

Due to the lack of accounting for human agency and rationality, the theory is controversial. Christopher Simpson, professor of communications at American University, writing in an article for the Journal of Communication, found the theory to be "riddled with totalitarian ideology."

Spiral of Silence model

== Allegations of antisemitism ==
In 1991, Leo Bogart criticized Noelle-Neumann, accusing her of antisemitic passages in her dissertation and articles she wrote for Nazi newspapers. As a young woman, she had "superb credentials as an activist and leader" of Nazi youth and students' organizations, he wrote. In fact, when she published her 1940 dissertation in Germany, entitled "Opinion and mass research in the USA", having spent a year at the University of Missouri researching George Gallup's methodology, Joseph Goebbels called the 24-year-old woman as an adjutant and intended her to build up, for the ministry of propaganda, Germany's first public opinion research organization. She declined, having fallen ill, which angered Goebbels; she later became a newspaper journalist with Nazi publications where she wrote some articles on Jewish influence over U.S. news and elite opinion.

Bogart's article appeared just weeks before Noelle-Neumann took up a visiting position in the Political Science Department at the University of Chicago, where she had held similar appointments since 1978. Michael S. Kochin, then a graduate student at the university, noticed the article and circulated it on campus prior to her arrival, igniting a vigorous debate on Noelle-Neumann's past. While the administration and students at the university, the local Jewish defense groups, and Chicago newspapers remained disengaged from the issue, John J. Mearsheimer, then chairman of the university's political science department, spoke with Bogart, met for over three hours with Noelle-Neumann, and called a departmental meeting about her on 16 October. Some at the university claimed Noelle-Neumann was being slandered, and Mearsheimer's colleagues were not of one opinion about the case. Mearsheimer, however, widely publicized his views concerning the allegations themselves and as they related to academic freedom and opposition to bigotry. "I believe Noelle-Neumann was an anti-Semite," Mearsheimer stated, "and was not forced to write the anti-Semitic words she published. Moreover, I believe that the anti-Semitic writers and publicists of Germany – to include Noelle-Neumann – jointly share some responsibility for the Holocaust. For this, she owes an apology." "The thing to remember about the killing of the Jews," he said, "is that it was not done by a handful of people. ... It was also a result of the Reich of normal – or of average – German citizens. Like Elisabeth Noelle-Neumann."

In private letters and in written responses, Noelle-Neumann acknowledged being in a Nazi student organization but denied being a Nazi. "I am anguished by the suffering of Jews in Nazi Germany," she wrote. Bogart, Mearsheimer and others remained dissatisfied with her response.

Noelle-Neumann completed her visiting position in Chicago in mid-December 1991 and returned to Germany. When some University of Chicago students learned that she was to return there on 13 March 1992, they called a rally to protest against her return. Reached by telephone at her office in Allensbach am Bodensee, Germany, on 10 March, Noelle-Neumann told a reporter she was unaware of the proposed rally but intended on coming to the university as planned. That day, her hosts at the National Opinion Research Center announced that she had cancelled her appearance "in light of serious threats".

Several years later, Noelle-Neumann's Nazi connection again came under scrutiny from Christopher Simpson, another American academic, but she never explicitly apologized for her past. Interviewed on the subject in 1997, she said, "I did my duty and would do my duty again in a second life. I'd even say I was proud of what I did back then because I opposed the Nazis by working from within."

In a letter to the Editor, Mearsheimer wrote in The New York Times on 16 December 1991:

She has admitted she was not hostile to the Nazis before 1940. She says she was anti-Nazi after 1940, but has produced no evidence that she criticized the Nazis then. She wrote anti-Semitic words in 1938–41, and there is no evidence she was compelled to write them. Queried on her anti-Semitic writings, she told me: "I have never written anything in my life that I did not believe to be true."

== Personal life ==
She was married to the Christian Democratic politician Erich Peter Neumann (1912–1973) from 1946 until his death. She was married to the physicist Heinz Maier-Leibnitz (1911–2000) from 1979 until his death.

In an interview in the German newspaper Der Tagesspiegel, Noelle-Neumann said that while holding a scientific point of view, she also believed in angels and predestination.

== Awards ==
- Commander's Cross of the Order of Merit of the Federal Republic of Germany (1976)
- Alexander Rüstow Medal (1978)
- Order of Merit of Baden-Württemberg (1990)
- Helen Dinerman Award (issued by WAPOR; 1990)
- Gerhard Löwenthal Prize, honorary prize (issued by Junge Freiheit; 2006)
