= Ryuzo Sato =

Japanese economist (born 1931)

- Born: 5 July 1931 (age 95); Yuzawa, Akita Prefecture, Japan

Academic background
- Education: Johns Hopkins University; Hitotsubashi University
- Doctoral advisor: Richard Musgrave, Edwin Mills

Academic work
- Discipline: Macroeconomics
- Institutions: New York University
- Doctoral students: Phillip Kott, Kazuo Mino
- Awards: Guggenheim fellowship (1974)

Ryuzo Sato (佐藤隆三, Satō Ryūzō; born 5 July 1931) is a Japanese economist and is the C.V. Starr Professor of Economics Emeritus at New York University. He made notable contributions to the fields of mathematical economics and economic growth. He is a founding editor of the Japan and the World Economy (Elsevier) and the book series Advances in Japanese Business and Economics (Springer Nature).

== Education and career ==
Sato graduated from Hitotsubashi University in 1954. As a Fulbright scholar, he earned his Ph.D. from Johns Hopkins University in 1962 and his Dr. (Econ) from Hitotsubashi University in 1969.

After holding positions at the University of Washington and University of Hawaii, he became a professor at Brown University from 1967 to 1985.

In 1985, Sato became the C.V. Starr Professor of Economics at the New York University Stern School of Business, and the Director of the Center for Japan-U.S. Business and Economic Studies. He was a Visiting Professor and Guggenheim Fellow at the University of Bonn and a Ford Foundation Fellow at the University of Cambridge, respectively; he was also a visiting professor at Kyoto University, Hitotsubashi University and the University of Tokyo. He was an Adjunct Professor at the Kennedy School of Government of Harvard University and a Research Associate at the National Bureau of Economic Research.

Sato won the 1968 Nikkei Economic Prize for his book, Theory of Economic Growth and the 1991 Yomiuri "Rondansho" Prize for Social Science Writing for his book, The Chrysanthemum and the Eagle: The Future of U.S.-Japan Relations.

Sato has done research and given lectures in both Japan and the United States. He regularly writes regular columns for several Japanese newspapers, including The Nikkei.

== Selected publications ==
- Samuelson, Paul A.; Sato, Ryuzo (1984). "Unattainability of Integrability and Definiteness Conditions in the General Case of Demand for Money and Goods". The American Economic Review. 74 (4): 588–604. JSTOR 1805125.
- Sato, Ryuzo (1970). "The Estimation of Biased Technical Progress and the Production Function". International Economic Review. 11 (2): 179–208. doi:10.2307/2525662. JSTOR 2525662.
- Sato, Ryuzo (1963). "Fiscal Policy in a Neo-Classical Growth Model: An Analysis of Time Required for Equilibrating Adjustment". Review of Economic Studies. 30 (1): 16–23. doi:10.2307/2296026. JSTOR 2296026.
- Sato, Ryuzo (2017). 佐藤隆三著作集 第1巻 文化・社会の日米比較 [Selected Works of Ryuzo Sato. Volume 1. U.S.–Japan Comparisons of Culture and Society]. Academic Press, Nippon Hyoron Sha Co.
- Sato, Ryuzo (2017). 佐藤隆三著作集 第2巻 米国から見た日本経済 [Selected Works of Ryuzo Sato. Volume 2. The Japanese Economy]. Academic Press, Nippon Hyoron Sha Co.
- Sato, Ryuzo (2017). 佐藤隆三著作集 第3巻 日本企業と大学の実態 [Selected Works of Ryuzo Sato. Volume 3. Japanese Firms and Japanese University]. Academic Press, Nippon Hyoron Sha Co.
- Sato, Ryuzo (2017). 佐藤隆三著作集 第4巻 経済成長の理論 [Selected Works of Ryuzo Sato. Volume 4. The Theory of Economic Growth]. Academic Press, Nippon Hyoron Sha Co.
- Sato, Ryuzo (2017). 佐藤隆三著作集 第5巻 技術変化と経済不変性の理論 [Selected Works of Ryuzo Sato. Volume 5. Theory of Technical Change and Economic Invariance: Application of Lie Group Theory]. Academic Press, Nippon Hyoron Sha Co.
- Sato, Ryuzo (2017). Selected Works of Ryuzo Sato. Volume 6. The Selected Scientific Papers of Ryuzo Sato on Production, Technical Change and Dynamics. Academic Press, Nippon Hyoron Sha Co.
- Sato, Ryuzo (2017). Selected Works of Ryuzo Sato. Volume 7. Symmetry and Economic Invariance. Academic Press, Nippon Hyoron Sha Co.
