= Timothy P. Johnson (sociologist) =

American sociologist and statistician

Timothy P. Johnson is professor emeritus of Public Policy, Management, and Analytics at University of Illinois at Chicago (UIC) and a Fellow of the American Statistical Association. His research focuses on research methods, social epidemiology, and survey methodology.

== Education and career ==
He received his Ph.D. in sociology from the University of Kentucky and MA in political science from the University of Wisconsin-Milwaukee. He has published more than 70 peer-reviewed articles, ranging from survey measurement and nonresponse errors, health behaviors of marginalized populations, and cross-cultural research. He has published five books: Advances in Comparative Survey Methods, Handbook of Research Methods in the Study of Substance Abuse, Handbook of Health Survey Methods, Hard to Survey Populations, and Survey Methods in Multinational, Multiregional and Multicultural Contexts.

He joined UIC in 1989 and served on over 80 dissertation committees. He also directed UIC's Survey Research Laboratory from 1996 to 2019. Since 2019, he has been a Senior Fellow at NORC at the University of Chicago.

He is known for his professional association leadership, including serving as 2021-2022 president of the World Association for Public Opinion Research, 2017-2018 president of the American Association for Public Opinion Research (AAPOR), and 2016-2018 president of the Association of Academic Survey Research Organizations.

== Recognition ==
In 2007, University of Kentucky Department of Sociology presented him with the Thomas R. Ford Distinguished Alumnus award. In 2014, he was named Fellow of the Midwest Association for Public Opinion Research.

He was elected as a Fellow of the American Statistical Association in 2015. In 2023, he was honored with the AAPOR Award for Exceptionally Distinguished Achievement
