= Survey Research Methods =

- Discipline: Survey Methodology
- Language: English
- Edited by: Ulrich Kohler

Publication details
- History: 2007; 18 years ago - present
- Publisher: European Survey Research Association
- Frequency: Triannual
- Impact factor: 4.8 (2022)

Standard abbreviations
- ISO 4: Surv. Res. Methods

Indexing
- ISSN: 1864-3361

Links
- Journal homepage; Open access

Survey Research Methods (SRM) is a peer-reviewed academic journal on survey methodology published by the European Survey Research Association. It was founded in 2005 by Peter Lynn (University of Essex), who became its first editor-in-chief. The first issue was published in 2007. The journal publishes articles in English discussing methodological issues of survey research. The current editor-in-chief is Ulrich Kohler (University of Potsdam). The journal is indexed by the Social Sciences Citation Index (SSCI), Scopus, and the Directory of Open Access Journals (DOAJ). It has a 5-year citation index of 3.4 according to Web of Science. The journal has signed the Transparency and Openness Promotion Guidelines of the Center for Open Science. Articles published in Survey Research Methods are free of charges for both, readers and authors.

== Publisher ==
Survey Research Methods is the official journal of the European Survey Research Association (ESRA). The ESRA was founded in 2008. According to the website, ESRA's main goal is to encourage communication between methodologists and researchers in substantive fields such as sociology, psychology, political science, and other disciplines employing survey data. Its main two activities are the biannual conferences that showcases the latest survey research with the latest conference in 2025, and the open access journal Survey Research Methods.

The ESRA Outstanding Service Award acknowledges individuals who provided significant methodological, substantive, or infrastructural contributions to European survey research. Honorees included Rainer Schnell (2021), Ineke Stoop (2019), Edith de Leeuw (2017), Jaak Billiet (2015), Willem Saris (2013), and Roger Jowell (2011).
