= Ineke Stoop =

Dutch survey statistician

Ineke Anežka Lucia Stoop (born 1953) is a retired Dutch survey statistician who was Head of Methodology at the Netherlands Institute for Social Research (SCB) and chaired the European Statistical Advisory Committee (ESAC).

== Education and career ==
Stoop was born on 14 March 1953 in The Hague. She earned a master's degree in psychology at Leiden University in 1980, and completed her Ph.D. in 2005 at Utrecht University.

She was a researcher at Leiden University from 1973 to 1983 before joining the Netherlands Institute for Social Research in 1983, and became Head of Methodology at the Institute in 1990.

She became chair of the European Statistical Advisory Committee in 2014, and retired in 2019.

== Books ==
Stoop is the author of books including:

- The Hunt for the Last Respondent: Nonresponse in Sample Surveys (her 2005 doctoral dissertation)
- Improving Survey Response: Lessons learned from the European Social Survey (with Jaak Billiet, Achim Koch and Rory Fitzgerald, Wiley, 2010)

She is also the editor or co-editor of edited volumes including

- Access Panels and Online Research, Panacea Or Pitfall? (Uitgeverij Aksant, 2008)
- Advances on Comparative Survey Methodology (Wiley, 2018)

== Recognition ==
Stoop is an Elected Member of the International Statistical Institute. She was part of the European Social Survey project, which won the Descartes Prize in 2005. She was a keynote speaker at the 2019 biennial conference of the European Survey Research Association, in Zagreb, where she was given the association's Outstanding Service Award.
