= Allensbach Institute =

German market research company

Institut für Demoskopie Allensbach
- Type: GmbH
- Industry: Public opinion research
- Genre: Opinion polling
- Founded: 1947
- Founder: Elisabeth Noelle-Neumann; Erich Peter Neumann
- Headquarters: Allensbach, Germany
- Key people: Elisabeth Noelle-Neumann; Renate Köcher
- Revenue: €8,500,000 (2005)
- Number of employees: 100
- Website: www.ifd-allensbach.de

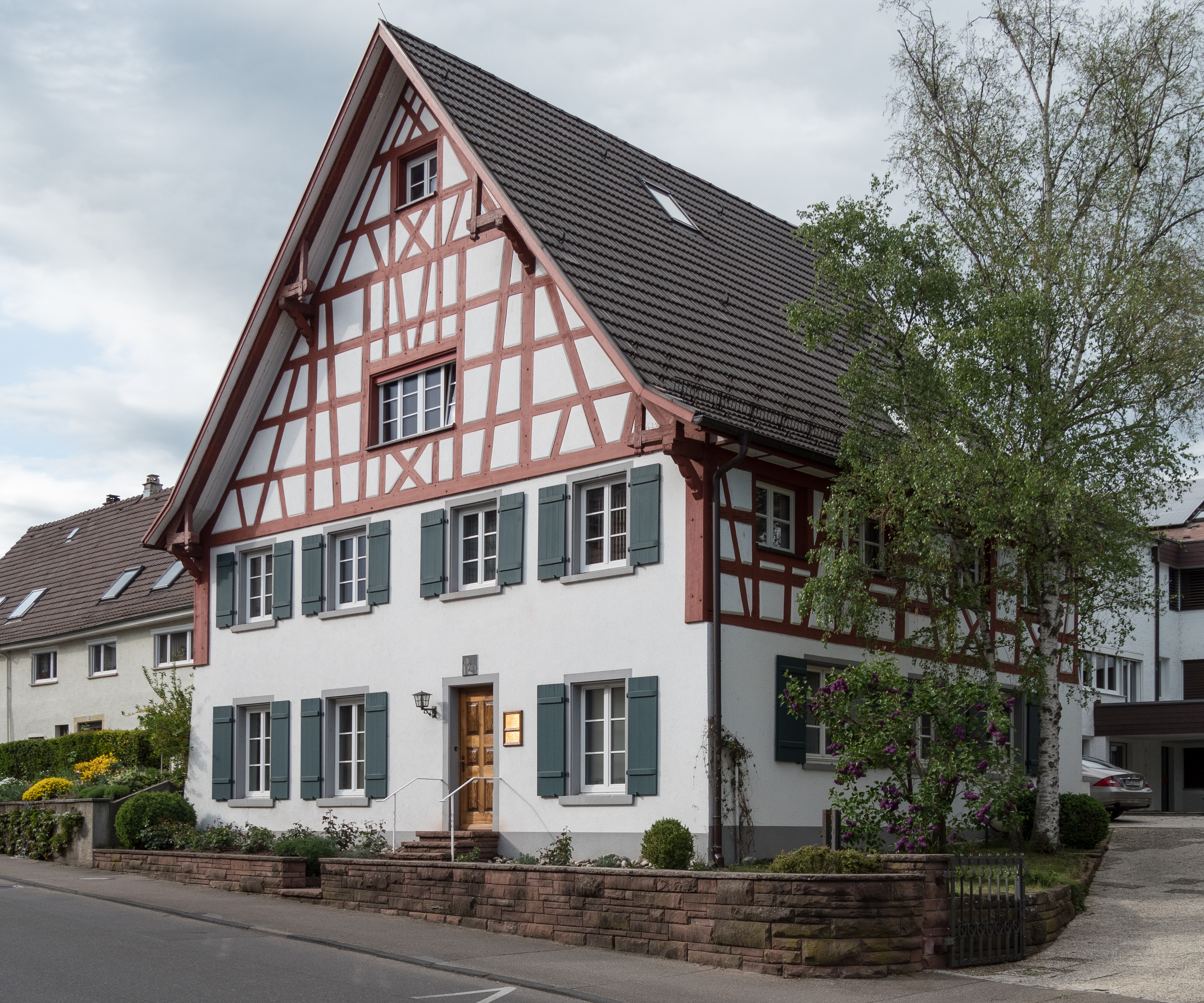
Allensbach Institute

The Allensbach Institute, formally the Allensbach Institute for Public Opinion Research or Allensbach Institute for Public Opinion Polling (German: Institut für Demoskopie Allensbach), is a private polling institute based in Allensbach, Baden-Württemberg, Germany.

== History ==
Founded in 1947 by political scientist Elisabeth Noelle-Neumann and journalist Erich Peter Neumann, and modelled after Paul Lazarsfeld's Wirtschaftspsychologische Forschungsstelle at the University of Vienna, the Allensbach Institute was the first public opinion research institute in Germany, depending primarily on the sale of market research studies for financing. The institute conducted the "first [post-war] inquiry to assess former Nazi support", and was contracted by the government of the Federal Republic of Germany in 1950 to carry out monthly surveys of domestic public opinion.

In 1988, political economist Renate Köcher, a former advisor to Chancellor Helmut Kohl, became managing director of the institute alongside Noelle-Neumann, who was also the sole shareholder in the company. Noelle-Neumann transferred ownership of the institute to the Allensbach Foundation for Public Opinion Research (German: Stiftung Demoskopie Allensbach) in May 1996.

The Allensbach Institute is noted for providing the most accurate prediction of the results of the closely contested 1998 German federal election.

== Activities ==
The Allensbach Institute conducts market, media and social research, as well as political opinion research, and has performed polls on topics ranging from participation in sports to "radio listening and newspaper reading habits" to support for a European monetary union and economic and monetary union. Deborah Ascher Barnstone, in a study of transparency in politics and architecture in Germany, asserted that the range of subjects covered by the Allensbach Institute makes it "an excellent source for information on the [German] general populace".

The institute is known for its annual New Year survey of the "state of the German soul" as commentator David Marsh, citing some 2012 and comparative results, termed it.

The institute employs roughly one hundred full-time employees, including about 25 scientists, and two thousand avocational interviewers, and conducts approximately one hundred surveys and 80,000 interviews yearly. Although the institute conducts surveys primarily of German public opinion, it has participated in or carried out multiple "international opinion research projects".

== See also ==
- European Society for Opinion and Marketing Research
