= Army Specialized Training Program =

American World War II-era program

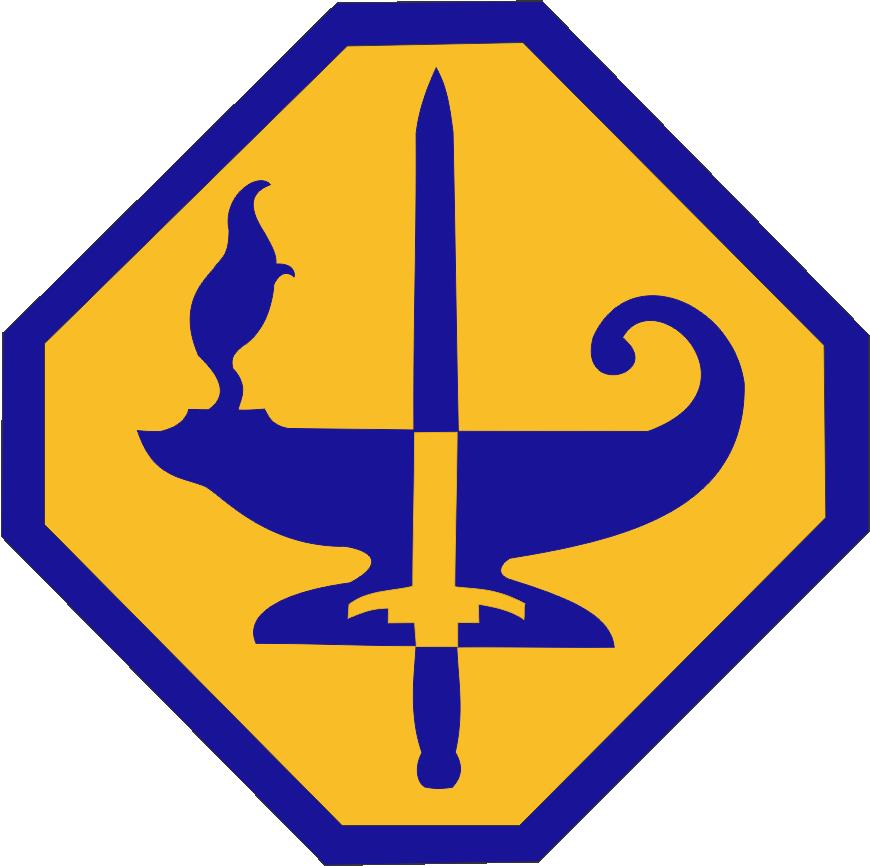
Insignia of the U.S. Army Specialized Training Program: the lamp of knowledge suggests academic learning, the sword represents the military profession

The Army Specialized Training Program (ASTP) was a military training program instituted by the United States Army during World War II to meet wartime demands both for junior officers and soldiers with technical skills. Conducted at 227 American universities, it offered training in such fields as engineering, foreign languages, and medicine.

The ASTP differed from the V-12 Navy College Training Program in producing technically trained personnel rather than officers as its primary goal, though recruits were told that they had the opportunity to become officers upon completion. The program was approved in September 1942, implemented in December of that year, and drastically curtailed in February 1944.

== History ==
=== Inception ===
After the 7 December 1941 attack on Pearl Harbor sparked U.S. entry into the war, the Army suspended the summer camp required for advanced members of the Reserve Officers' Training Corps in February 1942 for the duration of the war. This presented a problematic situation for the nation's numerous land-grant universities established under the Morrill Land-Grant Acts, whose constitutions included the legal agreement to teach "military tactics." A program that could provide a "continuous and accelerated flow of high grade technicians and specialists needed by the Army" would both help the war effort, offset ROTC enrollment turndown, and keep universities operating when most, if not all, male students would be absent. Colonel Herman Beukema, a professor of history at West Point, was named director of the Army Specialized Training Program, responsible for sending over 200,000 soldiers to 227 colleges at cost of $127,000,000. The program was proposed in September 1942, formally announced in December 1942, and began with a pilot program on college campuses in the spring of 1943. A maximum of 150,000 men were authorized to be enrolled in the program at any one time.

==== Army Specialized Training Reserve Program ====
During the late part of the 1942–1943 academic year, a national testing program was conducted among the male college and high school student bodies to determine acceptance into the ASTP or the V-12 college training program. A maximum of 25,000 high school graduates were offered scholarships through the Army Specialized Training Reserve Program (ASTRP). Examinees had to be older than 17 but not older than 18 years old, designate "Army" preference, meet or exceed the cutoff of the test (approximately one standard deviation minimum above the mean), and enlist in the Enlisted Reserve Corps and be found physically qualified for general military service. Reservists were called to active duty at the end of the academic term in which they turned 18.

=== Institutions ===
Unlike the Navy's V-12 college training program, the Army's criteria for hosting ASTP detachments predominantly favored large, state flagship institutions. All colleges and universities having advanced ROTC programs (i.e., all land-grant universities) were assigned to have ASTP detachments. If an institution had an engineering program, it had to be accredited by the Engineers' Council for Professional Development. No institution would be chosen to have programs of two or more services (ASTP, Army Air Forces College Training Program, or Navy V-12) unless it could accommodate a total of 1,000 or more trainees. Only 53 institutions had programs of two services and just two (the University of Minnesota and Pennsylvania State College) sponsored all three. By the fall of 1943, the Army had 321 ASTP contracts with 227 different institutions. Six of these were historically black colleges and universities: Howard University; Meharry Medical College; North Carolina A&T; Prairie View State College; West Virginia State College; Wilberforce University.

=== Students ===
==== Requirements ====
Entry requirements were high. Potential candidates included all enlisted men who were completing or who had completed basic training and had scored at least 110 (later 115) on the Army General Classification Test, a Stanford-Binet-type IQ test, compared to 110 for OCS candidates. Score requirements for certain specific programs were even higher. If under 22 years old, they had to have completed high school or its equivalent along with specified mathematics courses; if older than 22 years old, a minimum of one year of college, and "substantial background" in one or more languages, or a year of mathematics and physics, or biology.

==== Demographics ====
During 1943, about 100,000 participants in the ASTP came from within the Army, while about 50,000 were new inductees who had established their eligibility for the ASTP prior to entering the Army.

===== Civilians =====
During the national testing program, roughly 400,000 civilians were tested for pre-induction eligibility for the ASTP. Additional tests were conducted in November 1943 and March 1944.

===== Soldiers =====
Enlisted men were also given the qualifying test, and accepted only at the rank of private. Initially, field selection boards screened men and sent them directly to ASTP training from their units, but a downside of this arrangement was that many unqualified candidates were forwarded as many board members did not understand the program's objectives and requirements. Trainee selection was soon shifted to Specialized Training and Reassignment (STAR) units located at colleges, where men's academic and testing qualifications were examined and they and met with professors and Army officials about the types of training offered; if found unqualified, they were returned to their units.

In the spring of 1942, the Army had allowed men in colleges and universities studying specific subjects to enlist in the Enlisted Reserve Corps and defer a call to active duty until they had completed their degree requirements, left or dropped out, or were called to active duty by the Secretary of War. The director of the War Manpower Commission, Paul V. McNutt, announced in August 1942 that the destiny of all male students would be the armed forces, and the Secretary of War soon announced the termination of the program effective in the spring of 1943. By November 1942, about 70,000 men, or one in every seven male college students, had chosen to enlist in the Enlisted Reserve Corps. Reservists who had been found qualified for the ASTP were sent to basic training, and then assessed again when they returned.

Because so many men had graduated from ROTC and received commissions – 93,000 by March 1942, outnumbering Regular Army officers by over three to one – , and that program would become suspended during the war, men who wanted to advance had few choices but ASTP.

===== ROTC =====
The advanced ROTC program was suspended in its entirety in the spring of 1943 and no new contracts were issued for the duration of the war. The basic ROTC curriculum was kept intact as part of the military indoctrination for the Army Specialized Training Reserve Program. Several major categories of ROTC students existed:

- Members of the normal college class of 1942, who had completed a full four-year program plus the summer camp.
- Members of the normal college class of 1943 who had chosen to accelerate their studies via summer sessions offered in 1942 that gave a full semester or quarter of credit. These men graduated with a completed advanced course minus the summer camp at the end of 1942 if on the semester calendar, or in the early spring of 1943 if on the quarter calendar. These men, along with the members of the normal class of 1943, then went directly to officer candidate schools.
- Members of the normal college class of 1944 who had taken the 1942 summer session. These men graduated in the fall of 1943 with a partially complete (either three semesters out of four or four quarters out of six) advanced course. These men also went directly to officer-candidate schools, although some men attending institutions on the quarter calendar were allowed to remain in school through the summer quarter to ease congestion in officer-candidate schools.
- Members of the normal college class of 1945 who had taken the 1942 summer session, called "ROTC juniors." If their institution was on the semester calendar, they were due to begin advanced ROTC in the spring semester of 1943. They, along with the remaining members of the normal class of 1944, were sent to basic training after the spring semester ended.

After returning from basic training in the early fall of 1943, the ROTC juniors were allowed to resume their civilian curricula at the institutions they were attending or act as instructors in basic ROTC, which functioned as military indoctrination for the Army Specialized Training Reserve Program until called to officer candidate school. These men were only attached to the ASTP for administrative purposes.

=== Course ===
The highly accelerated ASTP was offered at 227 land-grant universities around the country. Class sessions were in twelve-week terms, with a break of one week between terms. Intensive courses were offered in engineering, science, medicine, dentistry, personnel psychology, and over 30 different foreign languages, with a different number of terms required to complete each. Most subject areas were divided into two phases, the first ("basic") phase covering general education in a subject, and the second ("advanced") phase covering instruction in a specific area. The Army prepared the curricula to be used; professors contracted to teach ASTP courses were required to teach eighteen "contact hours" per week, which was about twenty-five percent higher than their normal civilian course loads would have been.

Engineering
Basic	Advanced
3 terms (instruction in English, history, geography, geology, mathematics, physics, chemistry, and engineering drawing)	1 term (marine transportation); 3 terms (civil engineering); 4 terms (chemical engineering, mechanical engineering, sanitary engineering)

Medicine, Veterinary Medicine, and Dentistry
Preprofessional	Professional
5 terms (instruction in English, psychology, physics, biology, general chemistry, and organic chemistry)	Varied (followed the curriculum of accredited medical schools)

Foreign Language
Basic
Up to 3 terms (instruction in Arabic (western and eastern), Bengali, Bulgarian, Burmese, Chinese, Czech, Dutch, Finnish, French, German, Greek, Hindi, Hungarian, Italian, Japanese, Korean, Malay, Norwegian, Persian, Polish, Portuguese, Romanian, Russian, Serbo-Croatian, Spanish, Swedish, Thai, Turkish, or Vietnamese)

While in academic training the soldiers were on active duty, in uniform, under military discipline, and received regular Army pay. Recruits marched to class in groups (the Army stipulated that they be taught separately from civilian students or other military students on campuses), ate in mess halls located in their barracks, and trained in the fields around campus. The soldiers' week featured fifty-nine hours of "supervised activity," including at least twenty-four of classroom and lab work, twenty-four of required study, six of physical instruction, and five of military instruction. At its height in December 1943, about 145,000 men were enrolled in the program.

=== Administrative difficulties, 1943 ===
The number of voluntary applications soon proved disappointing, and all men already in the Army began to be screened for ASTP eligibility, regardless of interest. Beginning in the summer of 1943, the number of ASTP trainees from civilian sources (men who had become eligible before induction into the Army via the national testing program, scored 110 or over on the Army General Classification Test, or ERC members called to active duty) increased. Members of the first civilian group were assigned to replacement training centers or directly to units, under the assumption they would apply for the ASTP if interested; a downside of this was that "replacement centers trained men who did not become replacements and that units trained men whom they could not keep." Eligible men in the latter two civilian groups were already earmarked for the ASTP. In spring 1943, the Army Ground Forces proposed to train men of the first group in special basic training units.

Facilities for 50,000 men, the number the Army expected to appear in June and July 1943, were provided, 30,000 by redirecting facilities at existing replacement training centers, and 20,000 at Fort Benning, Georgia, and Camp Hood, Texas by spaces made available by the reduction of officer candidate quotas. Unfortunately, by 15 August 1943, only 17,152 of the 50,000 men were received, making a total shortage of 32,848 men, 21,799 of whom should have been received at the replacement training centers.

Requirements for overseas replacements intensified in mid-1943 because of the Invasions of Sicily and mainland Italy. Additionally, the output of replacement training centers, already incorrectly adjusted to the rate of ground combat casualties, fell off precipitously in the last half of 1943. This had several causes. Facilities unused by ASTP trainees sat idle and were not used for new classes of normal replacements until December 1943. The extension of the basic training cycle from thirteen to seventeen weeks in summer 1943 caused many groups of trainees to be held in the centers for over a month past the date when their graduations had been expected. Facilities also had to be reserved for several thousand college students enrolled in ROTC who had to complete basic training before admission to officer candidate school. Through January 1944, the Army was obliged to take 26,000 men from existing units for use as overseas replacements, comparable to the number of men who could have been trained at replacement training center facilities reserved for ASTP trainees who failed to appear. ASTP basic training was subsequently concentrated at Fort Benning and Camp Hood, and later at Fort Benning only.

By November 1943 the Army was having difficulties integrating men who received the specialized ASTP training back into their old units. In January 1944, Colonel Beukema reported to a U.S. Congressional investigating committee that the requirements for the ASTP were more demanding than those of either West Point or the Naval Academy. It was initially contemplated to allow only the graduates of the "advanced" course (roughly 25 percent of the ASTP participants) to apply for admission to officer candidate schools. With the reduction of the Army's troop basis in summer 1943, the need for additional officers in the ground arms nearly disappeared, and the Army was legally obligated to accommodate ROTC graduates (large numbers of whom became eligible from the spring of 1943 to the spring of 1944) in officer candidate schools first. The number of ASTP graduates being produced could not also be sent to schools without eliminating officer applicants from units and installations entirely. No quotas for ASTP students ever ended up being allotted to any officer candidate schools and few, if any, ASTP men ever got the opportunity to become officers.

=== Reduction ===
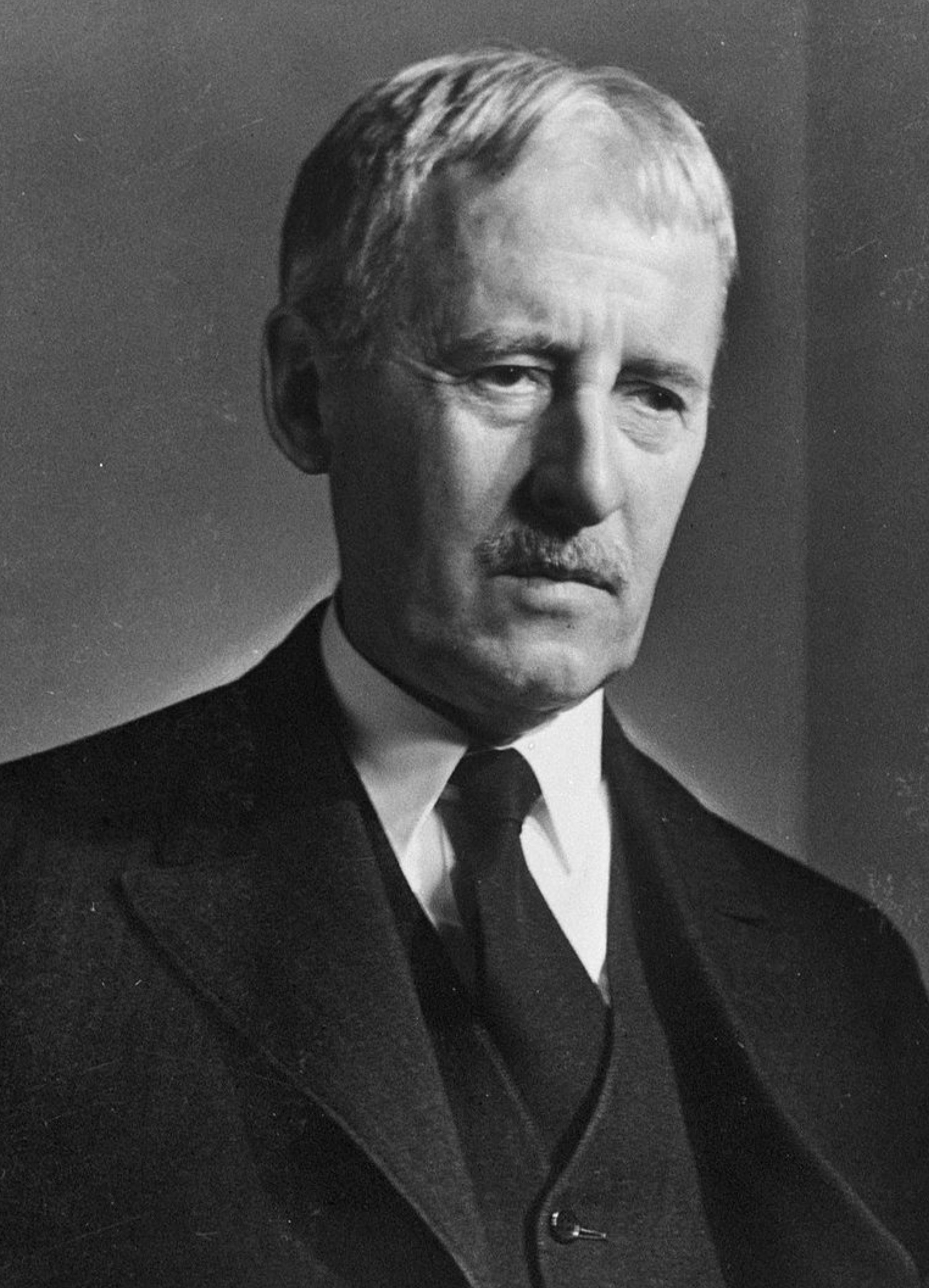
Henry Stimson

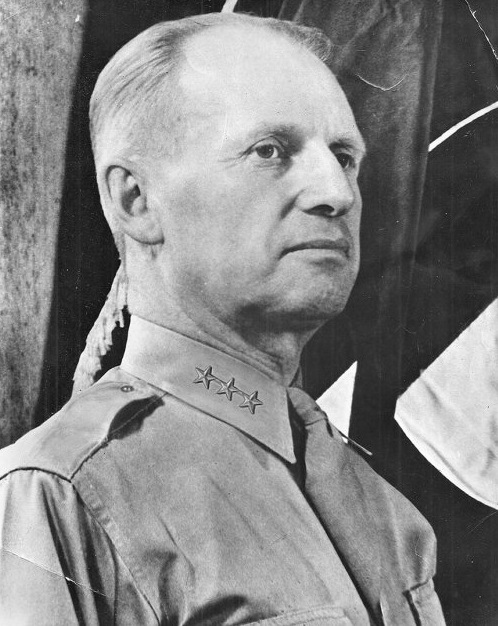
Lesley James McNair

Henry Stimson, Secretary of War during World War II and self-professed "father of the ASTP," wrote:

Each step of the ASTP story was tied in with the ups and downs in the Army's estimate of its manpower requirements. In all such changes, the college training program, as a marginal undertaking, was sharply affected. [The choice was] between specialized training and an adequate combatant force.

General Lesley J. McNair felt, with the full extent of the poorer morale and mental quality of U.S. combat troops when compared to men in other types of units being revealed in the winter of 1943, that the ASTP took young men with leadership potential away from combat positions where they were most needed. Annoyed, he stated, "with 300,000 men short, we are sending men to college." Manpower planners calculated that more infantrymen than expected would be required in advance of the planned invasion of Europe. The ASTP was not only one of the easiest programs to reduce or eliminate, but it also provided a large pool of already-trained soldiers. In November 1943, the G-3 of the War Department proposed that the ASTP be cut to 30,000 trainees, while the Army troop basis published in January 1944 called for the reduction of the ASTP to 62,190 trainees by the end of 1944. In mid-February 1944, about 110,000 ASTP students were told they would be transferred to more important duties by the beginning of April. Through the month of March 1944, all students in the basic programs, and some in the advanced programs, were gradually released and returned to the Army Ground or Service Forces or other branches of the Army.

Of the 86,167 men terminated from academic programs, 68,995 went to the Army Ground Forces, of which about 55,500 were assigned evenly to thirty-five airborne, armored, and infantry divisions. The divisions got roughly 1,500 former ASTP men each, while twenty-two of the divisions got roughly 1,000 former aviation cadets each; some divisions that were the most depleted or had the lowest intelligence ratings received nearly 3,000 men from these two sources combined. These thirty-five divisions amounted to essentially all of the divisions still in the United States that were not already scheduled for immediate overseas shipment, save the 10th Mountain Division, which already contained "an exceptional proportion of high-grade men." The divisions that received the ASTP men principally assigned them to their infantry components. The remainder were assigned to nondivisional AGF units. Since another purpose of curtailing the ASTP was to use the men to improve the quality of junior leadership in ground combat units, Army Ground Forces units that received the ASTP students gave up an equal number of men who had scored in the lower three grades on the Army General Classification Test, who were then transferred to the Army Service Forces.

16,086 ASTP students went to the Army Service Forces, of which 7,535 went to the Signal Corps, 3,153 to the Corps of Engineers, 656 to the Transportation Corps, and 4,742 to other service branches. 568 went to the War Department Military Intelligence Service, 274 to the Army Air Forces, 144 to the Army Civilian Affairs Division, and 100 to the Office of Strategic Services. The rest of the reduction consisted of men who left the program (either voluntarily or involuntarily) before they were terminated, about 12,000 men in STAR units whose processing was terminated, about 5,000 men in the advanced ROTC holding pools who departed for officer candidate schools, and men in basic training who had already been selected for the ASTP.

The 17-year-olds were continued in school until the age of 18, at which time they were transferred from the Organized Reserve to active duty and given their mandated basic training. After basic training, those who were willing were returned to the reduced number of land-grant schools still maintaining ASTP. From a wartime high of 145,000 students, the ASTP was immediately reduced to approximately 35,000 members. Units other than infantry units were permitted to select one-fourth of one percent of their men for ASTP testing per month to keep the program running on this highly-reduced basis.

Those men who had sacrificed non-commissioned rank to qualify for the college training were not necessarily reinstated, and often shortly went into combat as privates. Even though the ASTP men did not have the practical experience to qualify for non-commissioned officer rank, the Army anticipated that their superior training and intelligence levels would result in advancement to leadership positions.

=== Graduates in action ===
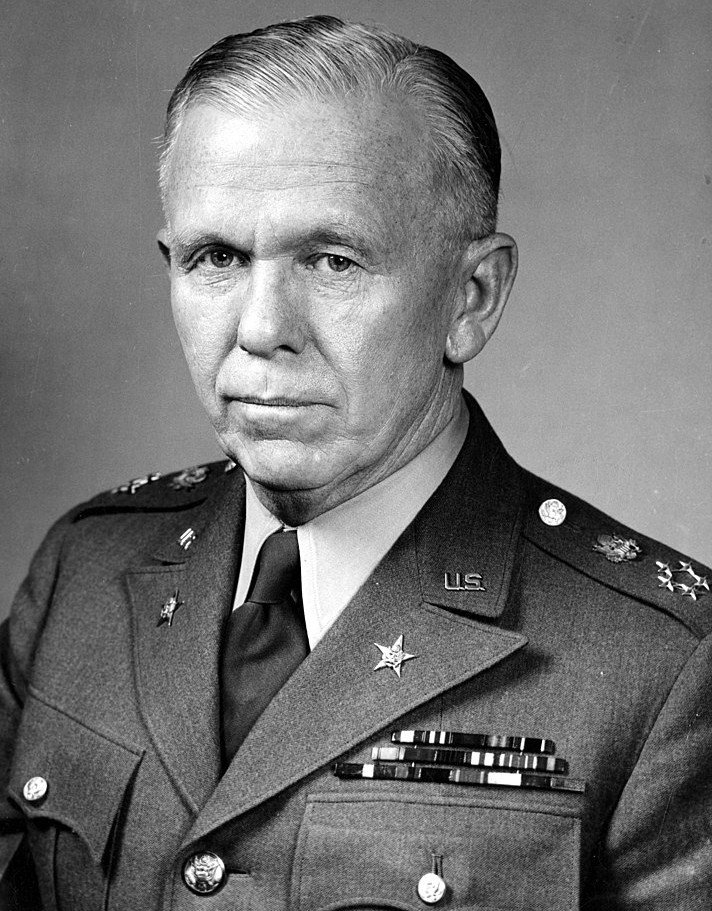
George Marshall

Fresh out of college, the new replacements were often given harsh receptions by both officers and veteran NCOs. One company commander asked, "What kind of soldiers deal out bridge hands during their ten-minute training breaks?" Conversely, ASTP personnel were often skeptical of the capabilities of their new superior officers and NCOs. However, as they integrated themselves into their new units and once in combat, the ASTP men rapidly proved their worth as good soldiers in most cases, and any distinctions between the regular Army and the college soldiers were erased. When the defeat of Germany was in sight, and the testing of the new atomic bomb successful, the apparent need for potential junior officer replacements disappeared and the final ASTP groups were largely disbanded, although there were ASTP units for medicine and engineering still existing in August 1945.

== Legacy ==
While the ASTP initiative suffered from manpower drawdowns to meet immediate combat needs, it did serve as an important financial subsidy of land grant colleges whose male student bodies had been decimated by the diversion of about 14 million men into the various armed forces.

Another positive effect of the ASTP effort was a softening of university resistance to lowering the draft age from twenty to eighteen. Finally, and most far-reaching, it exposed a large number of potentially very capable men to college who might not have attended otherwise. After the war ended, fully four out of five surviving ASTP alumni returned to college.

Still, critical views were held. A highly dismissive opinion was expressed by Major General Harry L. Twaddle, a former Army Assistant Chief of Staff G-3, who wrote, "The underlying reason for institution of the ASP [sic] program was to prevent some colleges and universities from going into bankruptcy. From a strictly mobilization viewpoint, the value of the program was nil."

=== Notable alumni ===
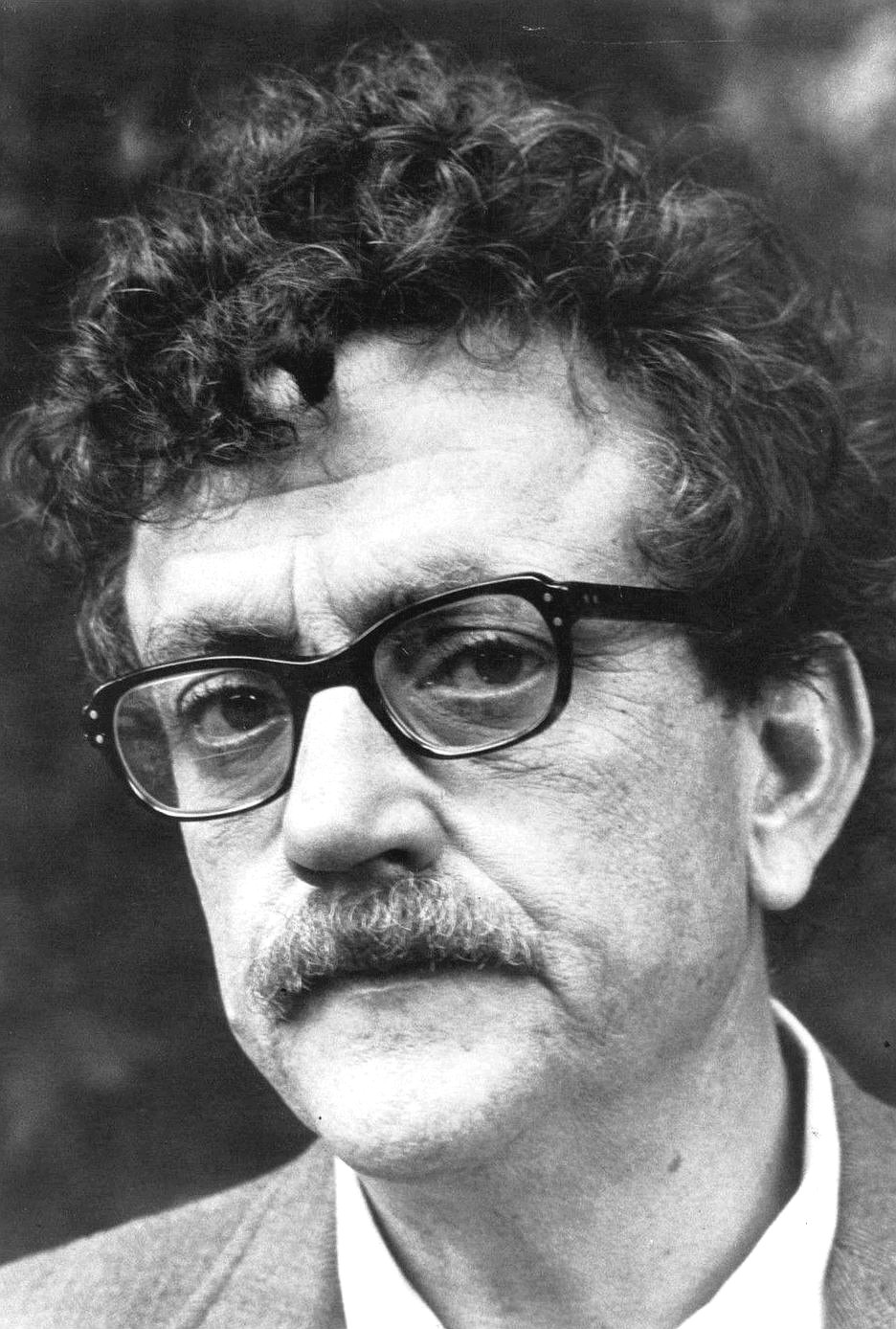
Kurt Vonnegut

Notable alumni of the ASTP include:

- Leo Bogart, American Sociologist
- Mel Brooks, American actor, filmmaker, and composer
- Heywood Hale Broun, sports commentator
- Frank Church, U.S. Senator
- Bob Dole, U.S. Senator and Senate Majority Leader
- Anthony Hecht, Pulitzer Prize winning poet
- Herman Kahn, futurist and theorist
- Henry Kissinger, U.S. Secretary of State, Nobel Prize winner
- Ed Koch, U.S. Congressman, New York City Mayor
- Pierre Koenig, architect
- Robert Kotlowitz, television producer, documentary filmmaker, writer, and former editor of Harper's Magazine
- George Koval, Russian spy in Manhattan Project World War II
- Roy Lichtenstein, American Pop Artist
- Victor A. Lundy, architect
- Arch Moore, former Governor of West Virginia
- Peter A. Peyser, U.S. Congressman
- Andrija Puharich, physician and parapsychologist
- Jerry Rosholt, author and historian
- Gore Vidal, author and politician
- Kurt Vonnegut, author
- Mort Walker, Beetle Bailey cartoonist
- Charles Warren, California politician; chairman of the Council on Environmental Quality

== See also ==
- V-12 Navy College Training Program
- United States Naval Reserve Midshipmen's School
