= Leo Bogart =

American sociologist

Leo Bogart (1921 in Poland – October 15, 2005 in New York) was an American sociologist and media and marketing expert.

== Biography ==
According to his obituary in The Independent, Bogart was "Born Jewish ... in Poland in 1921," and "had emigrated with his family to the United States aged two."

Bogart graduated from Brooklyn College in 1941, then became a U.S. Army Intelligence officer in World War II. After the war he engaged himself in the new communications sciences. During the 1960s, Bogart was among the first to analyze the declines in newspapers' readerships, television news viewerships, and radio news listenerships. He criticized the print media industry lack of marketing analysis to stop the trend.

Author of more than a dozen books and hundreds of articles, Bogart was best known for scientific analysis on the editorial content of newspapers, magazines, and television and relating the results to readership and viewership. He wrote a column for Presstime Magazine for many years.

He served as the executive vice president and general manager of the Newspaper Advertising Bureau; taught marketing at New York University, Columbia University and the Illinois Institute of Technology; and was a senior fellow at the Center for Media Studies at Columbia and a Fulbright research fellow in France.

Bogart served as president of the American Association of Public Opinion Research (AAPOR) and also the World Association of Public Opinion Research (WAPOR). He was an advocate for journalists to understand the opinion polls better that the media use.

At the time of his death in from babesiosis in 2005, Bogart was a director and senior consultant for Innovation, an international media consulting firm, and wrote a column for Presstime, the magazine of the Newspaper Association of America.

== WWII ==
Bogart entered the army around 1941/42. After a stint in the Army Signal Corps’ enlisted reserve, he was inducted into active duty and assigned to the ASTP (Army Specialized Training Program) after which he was assigned to Signal Intelligence where he was stationed in Europe. In 1946 Bogart was honorably discharged. In 2003, he wrote his memoir "How I Earned the Ruptured Duck: From Brooklyn to Berchtesgaden in World War II."

== Controversies ==
In 1991, Bogart criticized German public opinion research and political advisor Elisabeth Noelle-Neumann, who had served as WAPOR president before him.

He made her the center of controversy while she was a visiting professor at the University of Chicago, as he published "The Pollster and the Nazis" in the August 1991 issue of Jewish heritage and cultural magazine Commentary, accusing her of antisemitic passages in her dissertation and articles she wrote for Nazi newspapers.

In fact, when young journalist and sociologist Elisabeth Noelle published her 1940 dissertation "Opinion and mass research in the USA" in Germany, having spent a year at the University of Missouri to research George Gallup's methodology, Goebbels called the 24-year-old woman as an adjutant and intended for her to build up, for the ministry of propaganda, Germany's first public opinion research organization. However, she fell sick and could not accede her new position, angering Goebbels; she later became a newspaper journalist with Nazi publications where she wrote some articles on Jewish influence over U.S. news and elite opinion.

Bogart suggested there is a direct line from Nazi propagandist Joseph Goebbels to Noelle's theory of the "spiral of silence" and "public opinion as our social skin," which interpreted the group pressure band-wagon effect and the domination of leading mass media over public opinion. The accused wrote a letter of apology to the magazine, explaining that the passages served alibi functions under the dictatorship and were not meant to be harmful.

== Bibliography ==
- Silent Politics: Polls and the Awareness of Public Opinion (1972)
