= Statistics Sweden =

Swedish stats office and registration authority

- Statistiska centralbyrån

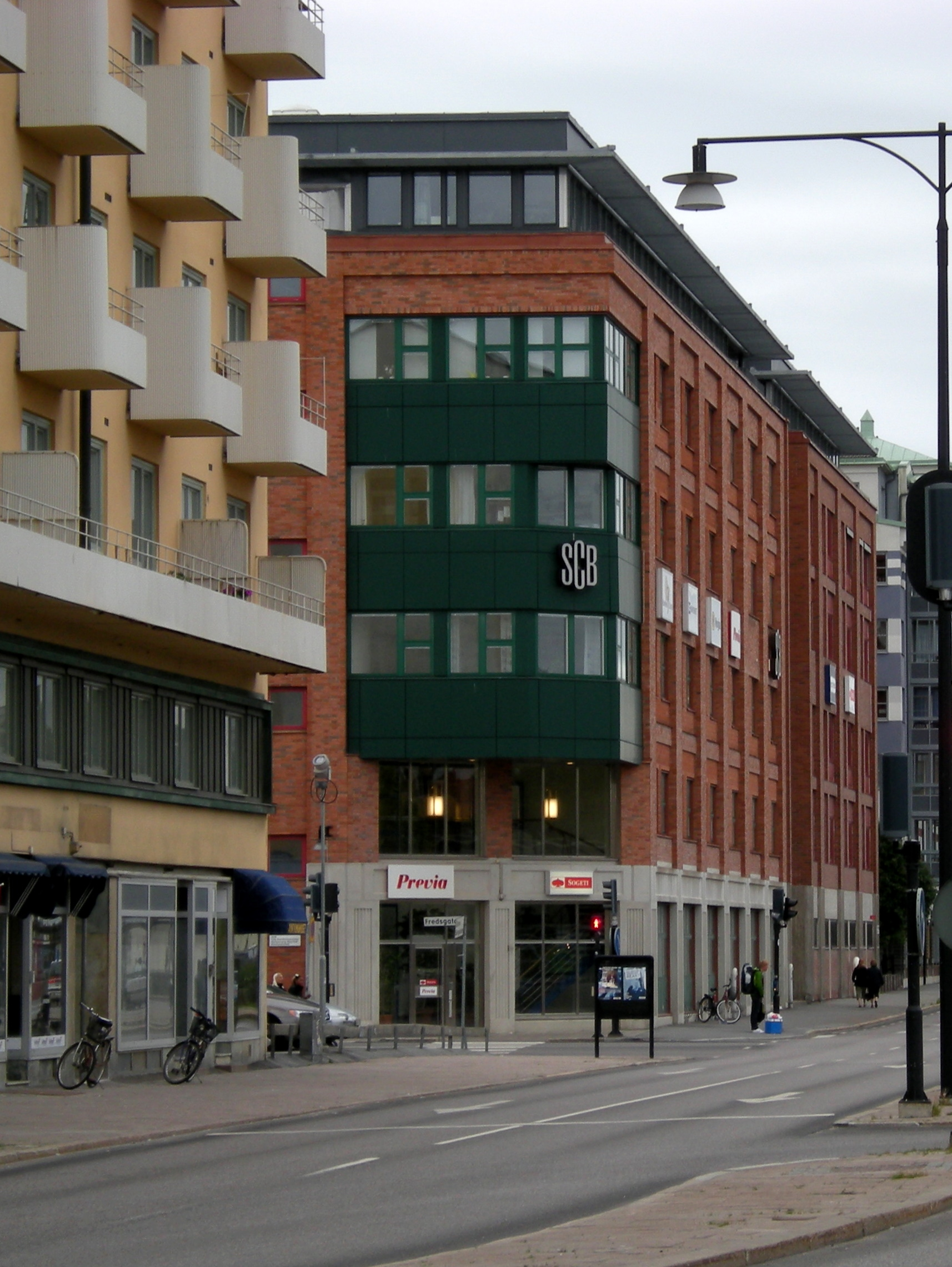
- The office in Örebro

Agency overview
- Formed: 1749
- Headquarters: Örebro
- Employees: 1,350 (2015)
- Agency executive: Joakim Stymne, director-general
- Parent department: Ministry of Finance
- Website: www.scb.se

Statistics Sweden (Swedish: Statistiska centralbyrån [staˈtɪ̌sːtɪska sɛnˈtrɑ̂ːlˌbyːrɔn], SCB, lit. 'Central Bureau of Statistics') is the Swedish government agency operating under the Ministry of Finance and responsible for producing official statistics for decision-making, debate and research. The agency's responsibilities include:

- developing, producing and disseminating statistics;
- active participation in international statistical cooperation;
- coordination and support of the Swedish system for official statistics, which includes 26 authorities responsible for official statistics in their areas of expertise.

National statistics in Sweden date back to 1686 when the parishes of the Church of Sweden were ordered to start keeping records on the population. SCB's predecessor, the Tabellverket ("office for tabulation"), was set up in 1749, and the current name was adopted in 1858.

== Subjects ==
Statistics Sweden produces statistics in several different subject areas:

- Agriculture, forestry and fishery
- Balance of payments and international investment position
- Business activities
- Culture and leisure
- Democracy
- Education and research
- Energy
- Environment
- Financial markets
- Health and medical care
- Household finances
- Housing, construction and building
- Judicial system
- Labour market
- Living conditions
- National Accounts
- Population
- Prices and Consumption
- Public finances
- Social insurance
- Social services
- Trade in goods and services
- Transport and communications

As of 2015, the agency had approximately 1,350 employees. The offices of the agency are located in Stockholm and Örebro. Statistics Sweden publishes the Journal of Official Statistics.

== See also ==
- Demographics of Sweden
- Eurostat
- Government agencies in Sweden
- List of national and international statistical services
