= International Journal of Public Opinion Research =

- Language: English
- Edited by: Porismita Borah

Publication details
- History: 1989–present
- Publisher: Oxford University Press (United Kingdom)
- Frequency: Quarterly
- Impact factor: 1.644 (2016)

Standard abbreviations
- ISO 4: Int. J. Public Opin. Res.

Indexing
- ISSN: 0954-2892 (print); 1471-6909 (web)

Links
- Journal homepage

The International Journal of Public Opinion Research (IJPOR) is a quarterly social science journal sponsored by the World Association for Public Opinion Research (WAPOR) and published by Oxford University Press.

Since 1994, WAPOR bestows the Robert M. Worcester Prize for the best article from the year in IJPOR; among prior recipients of the prize is communications researcher Dietram Scheufele. The Worcester Prize articles are free to read.

According to the Journal Citation Reports, the journal has a 2022 impact factor of 1.8.

== See also ==
- Public Opinion Quarterly
