= Purity spiral =

Social feedback loop leading to extremism

"Purity spiral" is a term for a form of infighting between activists and members of victim groups, in which they seek to outdo each other in zealotry. This self-reinforcing feedback loop is sometimes called "moral outbidding".

According to commentator Gavin Haynes, a purity spiral occurs when a community's primary focus becomes implementing a single value that has no upper limit, and where that value does not have an agreed interpretation. Notable historical examples to which the term has been applied include the French Revolution, the Moscow Trials, McCarthyism in the United States, and the Chinese Cultural Revolution.

== History ==
In The Rise of Victimhood Culture: Microaggressions, Safe Spaces, and the New Culture Wars, the term is described as one sometimes used for infighting among both activists and members of victim groups.

In a 2020 BBC piece about purity spirals, British journalist Gavin Haynes said that purity spirals punish people for "the most minor transgressions," and noted that they make it socially unacceptable to express a preference contrary to that of the group. Haynes has compared it to the idea of preference falsification put forward by Turkish-American academic Timur Kuran in his 1995 book Private Truth, Public Lies, with Kuran saying in 2020 that incentives and systems are needed to disrupt the process, and observing that even a small amount of opposition or doubt can lead to a greater wave of questioning within the group. Haynes sees French philosopher René Girard as having described many of the principles of the purity spiral, including mimetic rivalry and the scapegoat mechanism, in his 1972 book Violence and the Sacred.

== Examples ==
Haynes and others have given several examples of historical settings, groups, and eras in which they perceive purity spirals to have occurred:

- The French Revolution, which historians Katrin Redfern and Richard Whatmore label "perhaps the greatest [purity spiral] in history"
- The Puritan Revolution
- The Chinese Cultural Revolution, with its Red Guards and mass denunciations
- Moscow trials - demonstration of increasingly extreme loyalty tests required to maintain normalcy
- The actions of the Khmer Rouge
- McCarthyism
