= World Association for Public Opinion Research =

International professional association of researchers

- Abbreviation: WAPOR
- Formation: 1947; 79 years ago
- Type: Professional association
- Headquarters: Lincoln, Nebraska, USA
- Members: > 400
- President: Robert Chung
- Website: wapor.org

The World Association for Public Opinion Research (WAPOR) is an international professional association of researchers in the field of survey research. It is a member organization of the International Science Council.

== History ==
Established in 1947 at the Second International Conference on Public Opinion Research held in Williamstown, Massachusetts as the World Congress on Public Opinion Research, the association acquired its current name in 1948, at the Third International Conference on Public Opinion Research. In 1953, it became the sole nongovernment consultant organization to UNESCO in the field of polling.

Its current president is Robert Chung (Hong Kong Public Opinion Research Institute, in Hong Kong) with Immediate Past President Timothy P. Johnson (University of Illinois Chicago) and a Council of officers Among the former presidents of WAPOR are Juan Linz, Elisabeth Noelle-Neumann, Robert Worcester, Seymour Martin Lipset, and Michael Traugutt.

=== Membership ===
Over time, WAPOR's membership has grown and become more international. In 1956, roughly a decade after its founding, the association had 158 members from about 20 countries; by 1962, these figures had risen to approximately 200 and more than 30, respectively. In 1970, WAPOR had more than 300 members from 41 countries.

As of 2021, the association has approximately 500 members from research institutes and universities in over 60 countries on six continents. On February 8, 2011, WAPOR Latinoamérica became the first recognized chapter, followed by WAPOR Asia Pacific (2016), WAPOR West Asia and North Africa (WANA) (2018), and WAPOR Sub-Saharan Africa (2022).

== Activities ==
WAPOR sponsors the International Journal of Public Opinion Research, a social science journal published by Oxford University Press.

Annual conference are held in a three-year cycle: with American Association for Public Opinion Research (AAPOR) in North America (Toronto 2019), in connection with either ESOMAR (European Society for Opinion and Marketing Research) or ESRA in Europe (Lisbon 2017), and in the third year somewhere else (Morocco 2018). This arrangement permits WAPOR members to meet with academic, commercial, and government researchers from the main centers of survey research around the globe. The annual conferences are held in different countries each year, and the 2020 and 2021 annual conferences were held virtually due to the pandemic. AAPOR and ESOMAR are considered "allied associations." In 2021, WAPOR published a joint task force report with AAPOR on quality in comparative surveys.

Since 1981, WAPOR offers the Helen Dinerman Award – created to honour sociologist Helen Dinerman – to individuals who have made "significant contributions to survey research methodology". Prior recipients include social scientists Philip Converse, Louis Guttman, Roger Jowell, Elihu Katz, Juan Linz, Seymour Martin Lipset, Robert K. Merton, Elisabeth Noelle-Neumann, Sidney Verba, Robert Worcester, and Daniel Yankelovich.

== Influence ==
Richard Morin, former polling director of The Washington Post, described WAPOR as "the leading professional association of pollsters working outside the United States". Herbert Weisberg, a political scientist at Ohio State University and former president of the Midwest Political Science Association, further credited WAPOR with contributing to the internationalization, and thereby the professionalization, of the field of survey research.

== See also ==
- Opinion poll
- Public opinion
- American Association for Public Opinion Research (AAPOR)
- European Survey Research Association (ESRA)
- ESOMAR (European Society for Opinion and Marketing Research)
- Insights Association
