= Deborah Ascher Barnstone =

Australian author, historian and a professor

- Born: 1959 (age 66–67)
- Education: Barnard College, B.A. Columbia University, Master of Architecture; Delft University of Technology, PhD in architectural history
- Occupations: Author, historian, professor, architect

Deborah Ascher Barnstone (born 1959) is an author, historian and a professor at the University of Technology Sydney.

== Biography ==
Barnstone earned an undergraduate degree from Barnard College, a Master of Architecture degree from Columbia University, and a PhD in architectural history from the Delft University of Technology.

== Selected works ==
- Beyond the Bauhaus: Cultural Modernity in Breslau, 1918–33. (University of Michigan Press, 2016, ISBN 978-0-472-11990-5).
