= Journal of Official Statistics =

- Discipline: Statistics
- Language: English

Publication details
- History: 1985–present
- Publisher: Statistics Sweden (Sweden)
- Frequency: Quarterly
- Impact factor: 0.993 (2013)

Standard abbreviations
- ISO 4: J. Off. Stat.

Indexing
- ISSN: 0282-423X
- OCLC no.: 11960555

Links
- Journal homepage

The Journal of Official Statistics is a peer-reviewed scientific journal that publishes papers related to official statistics. It is published by Statistics Sweden, the national statistical office of Sweden. The journal was established in 1985, when it replaced the Swedish language journal Statistisk Tidskrift (Statistical Review), which had been published by Statistics Sweden since 1860 (with a hiatus between 1914 and 1952). It publishes four issues each year.

== Abstracting and indexing ==
Journal of Official Statistics is indexed in the Current Index to Statistics.
