= Helen Dinerman =

American sociologist

Helen Schneider Dinerman
- Born: December 25, 1920; New York City, New York
- Died: August 14, 1974 (aged 53); Portland, Oregon
- Education: Hunter College; Columbia University
- Known for: Public opinion research
- Scientific career
- Fields: Sociology
- Workplaces: International Research Associates

Helen Schneider Dinerman (December 25, 1920 – August 14, 1974) was an American sociologist and public opinion researcher.

== Biography ==
Born in New York City in 1920, Dinerman received her education at Hunter College and Columbia University. Later, she worked as a researcher in the United States Office of War Information and trained at the Bureau for Applied Social Research, the first academic research centre dedicated to survey research, founded by Paul Lazarsfeld in 1944. She began working with the International Research Associates in 1948, and became chairman of the firm's executive committee in 1968.

Dinerman died in Emanuel Hospital in Portland, Oregon on August 14, 1974, while on holiday with her daughter.

== Legacy ==
In 1981, the World Association for Public Opinion Research established the Helen Dinerman Award – "in memory of Helen Dinerman's scientific achievements over three decades of public opinion research" – to recognize individuals who have made "significant contributions to survey research methodology".

== Selected publications ==
- Lazarsfeld, Paul, and Helen Dinerman (1949). "Research for Action". In Paul F. Lazarsfeld and Frank M. Stanton (ed.). Communications Research, 1948–49. New York: Harper & Brothers. pp. 73–108.
- Cooper, Eunice; Helen Dinerman (1951). "Analysis of the Film "Don't Be a Sucker": A Study in Communication". Public Opinion Quarterly. 15 (2): 243–64. doi:10.1086/266306. JSTOR 2746167.
