= Survey Methodology =

- Discipline: Statistics
- Language: English and French

Publication details
- History: 1975–present
- Publisher: Statistics Canada (Canada)
- Frequency: Biannually
- Open access: Yes

Standard abbreviations
- ISO 4: Surv. Methodol.

Indexing
- ISSN: 0714-0045
- OCLC no.: 7123757

Links
- Journal homepage; Journal homepage in French

Survey Methodology (or Techniques d'enquête in the French version) is a peer-reviewed open access scientific journal that publishes papers related to the development and application of survey techniques. It is published by Statistics Canada, the national statistical office of Canada, in English and French.

The journal started publishing in 1975, publishes two issues each year, and is available open access in HTML online and PDF. The print version has been discontinued.

As of 2021, the editor-in-chief is Jean-François Beaumont, senior statistical advisor at Statistics Canada.

== Abstracting and indexing ==
Survey Methodology is indexed in the following services:

- Current Index to Statistics
- Science Citation Index Expanded
- Social Sciences Citation Index
