= James A. Davis =

American sociologist

James A. Davis (1929–2016) was a distinguished American sociologist who is best known as a pioneer in the application of quantitative statistical methods to social science research and teaching. Most recently, he was a Senior Lecturer in Sociology at the University of Chicago.

== Life ==
Born in Chicago, Davis grew up in Rockford, Illinois. He received his B.S. from Northwestern University in 1950, his M.S. from the University of Wisconsin in 1952, and his Ph.D. from Harvard University in 1955.

In 1972, while Professor Davis was Director of the National Opinion Research Center, he founded the National Data Program for the Social Sciences and developed the General Social Survey (GSS). He later co-founded the International Social Survey Program (ISSP).

The GSS is the biennial national survey that has been tracking social change in America continuously since 1972. The GSS provides scholars, policy makers, students, and the interested general public with data on Americans' attitudes, and continues to document changes in Americans' behavior and attitudes. The GSS is the second-most frequently used dataset in sociology, after the US Census.

In addition to teaching at the University of Chicago, Davis taught at Yale University (1956–1957), Johns Hopkins University (1963–1964), Dartmouth College (1967–1972, 1976–1977), and Harvard University (1977–1994), where he was the Chair of Sociology. Beginning in 1979, Davis and his wife, Martha Davis (also from Rockford, Illinois), were co-masters of Harvard's Winthrop House. Starting in 1977, he was an instructor in the ECPR Summer School in Social Science Data Analysis and Collection, at the University of Essex.

In 2010, Davis received the Warren J. Mitofsky Award for Excellence in Public Opinion Research from the Board of Directors of the Roper Center for Public Opinion Research at Cornell University.

He died on September 29, 2016, in Michigan City, Indiana, after a brief illness.

== Honors ==
- 1992 Distinguished Contributions to Teaching Award, American Sociological Association, 1989
- 1994 AAPOR Award, American Association for Public Opinion Research
- 1997 Levinson Award for Outstanding Teaching by a Senior Faculty Member, Harvard University
- 1997 Warren E. Miller Award for Meritorious Services to the Social Sciences, Inter-University Consortium for Political and Social Research (ICPSR)
- 2010 Mitofsky Award for Excellence in Public Opinion Research, Roper Center, University of Connecticut

== Selected publications ==
- 1967: "Clustering and structural balance in graphs", Human Relations 20:181–7
- 1971: "The Logic of Causal Order" in Elementary Survey Analysis, Englewood Cliffs, N.J.: Prentice-Hall, 1985 Sage Publishing
- 1992: (with Tom W. Smith) The NORC General Social Survey, Sage
- 1994: "What's Wrong with Sociology." Sociological Forum 9: 179–97
- 1997: "The GSS Capturing American Attitude Change." in The Public Perspective, February–March: 31–34
- 2001: "Testing the Demographic Explanation of Attitude Trends: Secular Trends in Attitudes Among U.S. Householders, 1972-1996," in Social Science Research 30: 363–385
- 2003: "Did Growing Up in the 1960s Leave a Permanent Mark on Attitudes and Values? Evidence from the GSS," in Public Opinion Quarterly 68: 161–183
