= Samuel Lubell =

American pollster, journalist, and author

- Born: Samuel Lubelsky; November 3, 1911; Congress Poland
- Died: August 16, 1987 (aged 75); Los Angeles, California, US
- Education: City College of New York; Columbia University Graduate School of Journalism
- Occupations: Pollster, journalist, author
- Notable work: Revolt of the Moderates; The Future of American Politics
- Awards: National Book Award for Nonfiction finalist (1957); Guggenheim Fellowship (1950, 1953)

Samuel Lubell (né Lubelsky; November 3, 1911 – August 16, 1987) was an American public opinion pollster, journalist, and author who successfully predicted election outcomes using door-to-door voter interviews. He published six books, including Revolt of the Moderates (1956), a finalist for the National Book Award for Nonfiction in 1957.

== Early life and education ==
Lubell was born the youngest of nine children in a village on the Russian-German border in what is now Poland in November 1911. His family emigrated to the United States when he was two years old. He attended James Monroe High School.

Lubell took evening classes at CUNY from 1927 to 1931 and graduated from the Columbia University Graduate School of Journalism in 1933. In 1934, he received a Pulitzer Traveling Scholarship from Columbia to tour Europe.

== Career ==
Lubell became a reporter for the Long Island Daily Press before moving to Washington, D.C. in 1938 to write for The Washington Post, the Richmond Times-Dispatch, The Washington Herald, and The Saturday Evening Post.

Starting in December 1941, Lubell worked as a writer for the US Office of War Information, as an aide to James F. Byrnes of the Office of Economic Stabilization, and as chief aide to Bernard Baruch, becoming Baruch's confidant and ghostwriter. He was a foreign correspondent in Europe and Asia between 1944 and 1946.

In a turning point for Lubell's career, the Saturday Evening Post asked him to analyze the 1948 US presidential election, in which Harry S. Truman defeated Thomas E. Dewey despite contrary predictions by pollsters George Gallup, Elmo Roper, and Archibald Crossley. Lubell combined innovative public opinion analysis with historical and political analysis, leading to his influential books The Future of American Politics (1952) and The Revolt of the Moderates (1956) and a syndicated political column called “The People Speak.” Using door-to-door voter interviews, polling data, and demographic data, he examined key precincts to predict election outcomes and illustrate national shifts. This methodology enabled him to predict the 1952 US presidential election correctly by examining polls from three precincts in Richmond, Virginia.

From 1958 to 1968, Lubell ran the Opinion Reporting Workshop at Columbia University and later taught courses at American University. He received Guggenheim Fellowships in 1950 and again in 1953. He also served as a fellow at the Harvard Kennedy School. He was a member of the National Press Club.

Lubell's papers are held at the University of Connecticut Archives and Special Collections at the Dodd Center for Human Rights.

== Personal life ==
Lubell married Helen Sopot (1911–2002) in 1941. After suffering a stroke at the age of 65, he retired and moved to Los Angeles with his wife in 1976. He died of another stroke at a Los Angeles nursing home on August 16, 1987. He was survived by his wife and their two sons, Walter and Bernard.

== Published books ==
- Lubell, Samuel (1952). The future of American politics. New York: Harper. OCLC 911001.
- Lubell, Samuel (1955). The revolution in world trade and American economic policy. New York: Harper. OCLC 6313158.
- Lubell, Samuel (1956). Revolt of the moderates. New York: Harper. OCLC 1057998.
- Lubell, Samuel (1964). White and black: test of a nation. New York: Harper & Row. OCLC 422588.
- Lubell, Samuel (1970). The hidden crisis in American politics. New York: Norton. ISBN 978-0-393-05370-8. OCLC 85378.
- Lubell, Samuel (1973). The future while it happened. New York: Norton. ISBN 978-0-393-05479-8. OCLC 609870.
