= Stanley Presser =

American academic (born 1950)

- Born: 1950
- Alma mater: University of Michigan
- Awards: Fellow of the American Statistical Association (1994); Fellow of the American Association for the Advancement of Science (2016); Paul F. Lazarsfeld Award (2012)
- Academic career
- Institutions: University of Maryland
- Doctoral advisor: Howard Schuman

Stanley Presser, a social scientist, is a Distinguished University Professor at the University of Maryland, where he teaches in the Sociology Department and the Joint Program in Survey Methodology (JPSM). He co-founded JPSM with colleagues at the University of Michigan and Westat, Inc., and served as its first director. He has also been editor of Public Opinion Quarterly and president of the American Association for Public Opinion Research.

Presser did his doctoral work at the University of Michigan, working with Howard Schuman on a National Science Foundation grant studying question wording and attitude surveys. Presser has done basic research on various aspects of survey measurement and survey nonresponse, as well as applied research using surveys to measure the value of public goods. His research is reported in many journal articles and several books, including Questions and Answers in Attitude Surveys: Experiments on Question Form, Wording, and Context (with H. Schuman); Survey Questions: Handcrafting the Standardized Questionnaire (with J. M. Converse); Methods for Testing and Evaluating Survey Questionnaires (with J. Rothgeb, M. Couper, J. Lessler, E. Martin, J. Martin, and E. Singer), and Valuing Oil Spill Prevention (with R. Carson, M. Conaway, M. Hanemann, J. Krosnick, and R. Mitchell).

He is a fellow of the American Statistical Association, and of the American Association for the Advancement of Science and has received the Paul F. Lazarsfeld Award for a career of outstanding contributions to methodology in sociology (from the American Sociological Association's Methodology Section), the AAPOR Award for exceptionally distinguished achievement (from the American Association for Public Opinion Research), and – with Howard Schuman—the Philip E. Converse Award for outstanding book published at least 5 years before (from the American Political Science Association's Elections, Public Opinion and Voting Section).
