= Bruce Lannes Smith =

American political scientist (1909–1987)

Bruce Lannes Smith (11 December 1909 in Webster Groves, Missouri – 1987) was an American political scientist, communication theorist, and propaganda specialist. His primary research focus was the various uses and techniques of propaganda and persuasion employed by governments that were considered enemies of the United States. He taught at Michigan State College and other institutions. After the Second World War he was involved with research on propaganda and mass persuasion on a mass audience while also questioning the methods used by the Nazi propaganda theorist Franz Six.

== Life ==
Smith was a student of Harold D. Lasswell at the University of Chicago and in 1933 earned a Ph.D. in political science and economics. From 1933 to 1936 he was a graduate student and from 1934 to 1936 research assistant at the city's Department of Political Science. From 1938 to 1941 he worked as an Instructor of Economics at New York University. From 1942 to 1943 he was a lecturer at the American University in Washington, DC. After leaving American University he again went to work at the University of Chicago, where he would later become Instructor at the Social Science Division and Research Associate. He took on a number of posts throughout his academic career; among these many posts he was to become Instructor to the US Government. One of his students was Morris Janowitz, who became a senior propaganda analyst at the Organization and Propaganda Section in the U.S. Department of Justice from 1941 to 1943. Smith also accepted an academic appointment at the University of Chicago from 1939 to 1944. He was also Associate Editor of the journal Public Opinion Quarterly.

From 1941 to 1944 he worked as an analyst in the Organization and Propaganda Analysis Section of the United States Department of Justice War Division. He was mainly concerned with countermeasures to curb anti-democratic propaganda. From 1943 to 1944 he was Senior Intelligence Officer of the Foreign Economic Administration and, in addition to other social scientists, he was a main research analyst at the Research and Analysis Branch of the Office of Strategic Services (which would later become the CIA) which studied the effects of mass persuasion. Subsequently, he was Attaché and US Political Advisor for the Federal Republic of Germany at the Supreme Headquarters Allied Expeditionary Force in France. In 1945 he was involved in the search for Nazi propaganda theorist Franz Six and was apparently involved in his actual interrogation after his capture. From 1946 to 1948 he was Chief of the Department Information Control Division at the Office of Military Government for Germany in Berlin.

After the Second World War he worked as a lecturer again; in 1949–1950 he was associate professor at the Foreign Service Institute at the State Department in Washington, D.C., but had to leave the post in the McCarthy era because of its supposedly "left-liberal" sentiments. Then from 1950 to 1963 he was appointed associate professor of political science at Michigan State College in East Lansing. In 1951 he became editor of the journal International Political Science Abstracts.

Smith was married to Chitra R. Smith, a member of the Bureau of Social Science Research, and in 1952 they co-authored "International Communication and Political Warfare, An Annotated Bibliography". Smith was also a member of the American Political Science Association. He published in journals such as the International Social Science Bulletin, Public Opinion Quarterly, Journalism Quarterly and Psychological Bulletin. In the 1970s, Smith was author of an article about propaganda in the Encyclopædia Britannica. His later research focused on the science of political parties, public opinion, international relations and political behavior.

== Writings ==
- with Harold D. Lasswell, Ralph D. Casey: Propaganda and Promotional Activities: An Annotated Bibliography . University of Minnesota Press, Minneapolis 1935
- with Harold D. Lasswell, Ralph D. Case: Propaganda, Communication, and Public Opinion; A Comprehensive Reference Guide . Princeton University Press, Princeton 1946
- with Chitra R. Smith: International Communications and Political Opinion: A Guide to the Literature . Princeton University Press, Princeton 1956
- Indonesian-American Cooperation in Higher Education . Institute of Research on Overseas Programs, Michigan State University., 1960

== Literature ==
- Thyme Bussemer : propaganda. Concepts and theories . With a foreword by Peter Glotz, VS Verlag für Sozialwissenschaften, Wiesbaden 2005. ISBN 3-8100-4201-3, S. 169 (Curriculum Vitae).
