= Eric Schickler =

American political scientist (born 1969)

Eric Schickler (born June 9, 1969) is an American political scientist, currently the Jeffrey & Ashley McDermott Endowed Chair at University of California, Berkeley and an Elected Fellow of the American Academy of Arts & Sciences.

In 2013, Schickler received the Warren J. Mitofsky Award for Excellence in Public Opinion Research from the Board of Directors of the Roper Center for Public Opinion Research at Cornell University.
