= Stephanie Eckman =

American data scientist

Stephanie Eckman is an American data scientist and an expert on data quality and survey methodology. She works at Amazon as a principal research scientist, is also an affiliated researcher with the Social Data Science Center at the University of Maryland, and is a former chair of the Social Statistics Section of the American Statistical Association.

== Education and career ==
Eckman majored in economics at Smith College, graduating magna cum laude in 1994. After a 1998 master's degree in economics from the University of Massachusetts Amherst, she worked as a data analyst at the Massachusetts Institute for Social and Economic Research in Amherst, Massachusetts, and then from 2001 to 2010 as a senior methodologist for the National Opinion Research Center.

Meanwhile, she completed a Ph.D. in statistics and survey methodology at the University of Maryland, College Park in 2010, with a term as a guest researcher visiting Andreas Diekmann at ETH Zurich. Her dissertation, Errors in housing unit listing and their effects on survey estimates, was supervised by Frauke Kreuter.

From 2010 to 2015 she worked in Germany as a tenured researcher at the Institute for Employment Research in Nuremberg and in 2013–2014 she was interim chair for statistics and social science methods in the Department of Sociology at the University of Mannheim. She worked as a fellow at RTI International from 2016 to 2022. In 2023, she took her present position at Amazon, and joined the University of Maryland Social Data Science Center as a researcher and data scientist.

Eckman was the 2023 chair of the Social Statistics Section of the American Statistical Association.

== Recognition ==
Eckman was elected as a Fellow of the American Statistical Association in 2021, "for innovative contributions to survey research methodology – including ground-breaking research on measurement error, enhanced approaches to coverage, and investigations into complementary data sources – and for extensive service to the profession.
