= John Mueller =

American political scientist (born 1937)

John E. Mueller
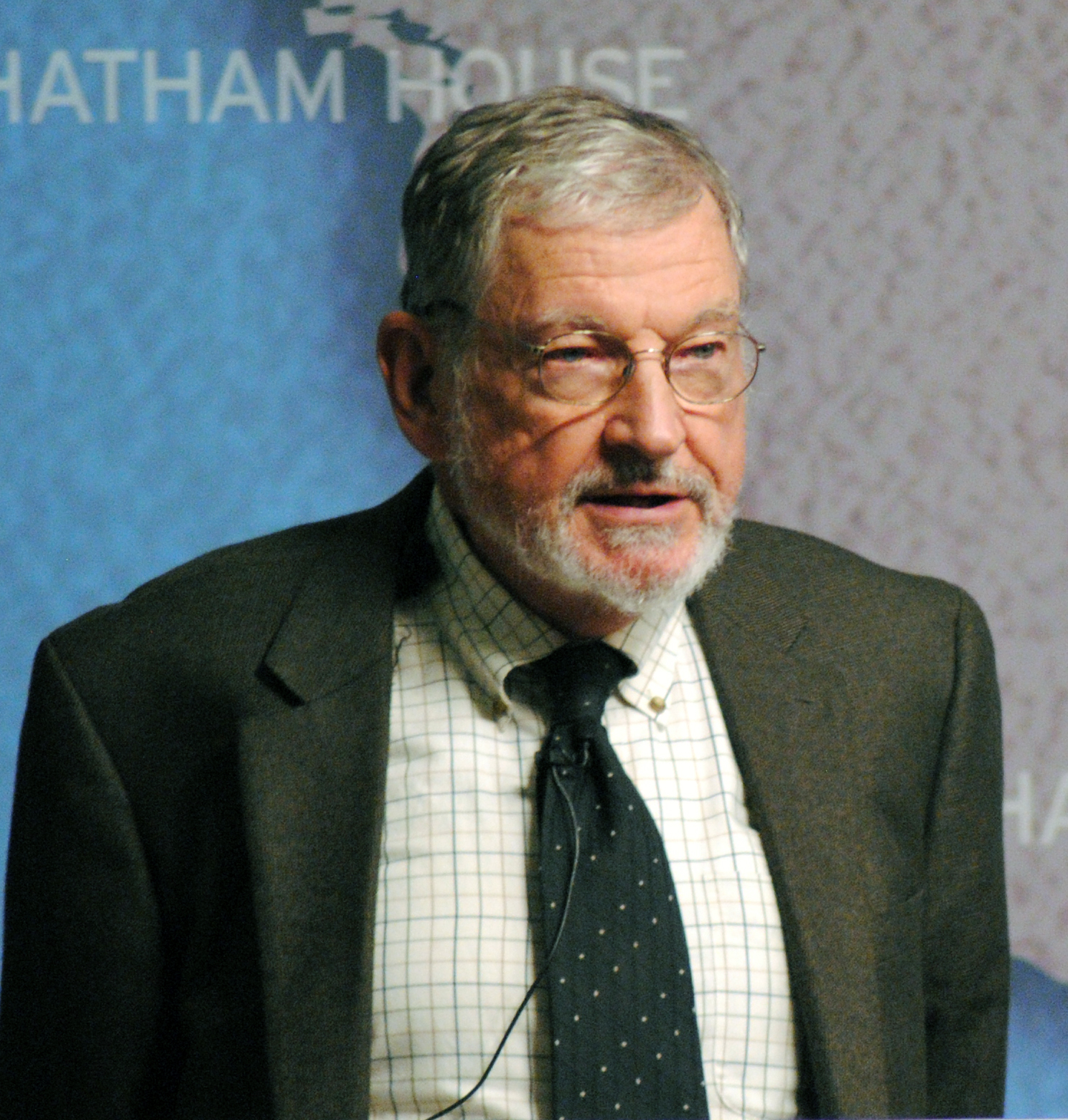
- Mueller speaking at Chatham House in 2013
- Born: June 21, 1937 (age 89); Saint Paul, Minnesota, U.S.
- Occupation: Professor
- Employer: Ohio State University
- Known for: National security
- Awards: Warren J. Mitofsky Award for Excellence in Public Opinion Research from the Roper Center for Public Opinion Research (2007)
- Website: OSU Faculty Page

John E. Mueller (born June 21, 1937) is an American political scientist in the field of international relations as well as a scholar of the history of dance. He is recognized for his ideas concerning "the banality of 'ethnic war'" and the theory that major world conflicts are quickly becoming obsolete.

== Career ==
Born in Saint Paul, Minnesota, he received his bachelor's degree from the University of Chicago in 1960 and his Master's (MA Thesis: The Politics of Fluoridation in Seven California Cities) and PhD (PhD Dissertation: Reason and Caprice: Ballot Patterns in California) from UCLA in 1963 and 1965, respectively.

He currently is the Woody Hayes Chair of National Security Studies at the Mershon Center for International Security Studies and a professor of both political science and dance at The Ohio State University.

Mueller was Jon Stewart's guest on the October 31, 2006 episode of The Daily Show featuring the Midwest Midterm Midtacular: Battlefield Ohio, discussing his book Overblown. He also appeared on Fox News show Hannity & Colmes and on C-SPAN's Washington Journal, December 17, 2006, again discussing Overblown and took viewer questions for 54 minutes.

On February 23, 2006, Mueller was a guest on the 20/20 special titled "Scared Stiff: Worried in America with John Stossel".

Mueller's 2004 book, The Remnants of War, was awarded Georgetown University's Lepgold Prize as that year's best book on international relations.

Mueller's 2010 book Atomic Obsession presents the case that nuclear weapons have had little historical significance, that their destructive power is hysterically exaggerated, that nuclear proliferation has been slower and more limited than mainstream predictions, and that such weapons are practically useless and are a waste of money, time, and talent.

Mueller's book War, Presidents and Public Opinion (New York: Wiley, originally published in 1973) was awarded the first Warren J. Mitofsky Award for Excellence in Public Opinion Research by the Roper Center for Public Opinion Research at the University of Connecticut in 2007, for being "a trailblazing book in public opinion research, in political science, and in the use of the Roper Center's data." This book featured the first definition of what is known as the Rally Round the Flag Syndrome. It also analyzed press coverage of the Tet offensive, 1968, in the Vietnam War.

Although primarily known as a political scientist, Mueller is also an expert on filmed dance and a leading authority on the work of Fred Astaire in particular, having published Astaire Dancing – The Musical Films in 1985, a now-standard reference work that was honored by the Dance Perspectives Foundation as "the most distinguished book-length manuscript in the history of dance", and awarded the de la Terre Buono prize. He has also authored the reference articles on Astaire for American National Biography and the International Encyclopedia of Dance. In addition, he has published extensively in Dance Chronicle, Quarterly Review of Film Studies, Cinema Journal and Dance Magazine.

In 2007, Mueller received the Warren J. Mitofsky Award for Excellence in Public Opinion Research from the board of directors of the Roper Center for Public Opinion Research at Cornell University.

== Selected publications ==
- Astaire Dancing – The Musical Films of Fred Astaire (Knopf, 1985) ISBN 0-394-51654-0
- Retreat from Doomsday: The Obsolescence of Major War (Basic Books, 1989) ISBN 0-465-06939-8
- Policy and Opinion in the Gulf War (University of Chicago Press, 1994) ISBN 0-226-54565-2
- Quiet Cataclysm: Reflections on the Recent Transformation of World Politics (Longman, 1997) ISBN 0-673-99327-2
- Capitalism, Democracy, and Ralph's Pretty Good Grocery (Princeton University Press, 2001) ISBN 0-691-09082-3
- The Remnants of War (Cornell University Press, 2004) ISBN 0-8014-4239-7
- Overblown: How Politicians and the Terrorism Industry Inflate National Security Threats, and Why We Believe Them (Free Press, 2006) ISBN 1-4165-4171-3
- "Is There Still a Terrorist Threat?", Foreign Affairs, September/October 2006
- "War Has Almost Ceased to Exist", Political Science Quarterly, 124 (2009) pp. 297–321
- "Capitalism, Peace, and the Historical Movement of Ideas", International Interactions, 36/2 (2010) pp. 169–184
- Atomic Obsession: Nuclear Alarmism From Hiroshima to Al-Qaeda (Oxford University Press, 2010) ISBN 0-19-538136-X
- Astaire Dancing – The Musical Films of Fred Astaire (25th Anniversary Edition—Digitally Enhanced, The Educational Publisher, 2010) ISBN 1-934849-31-6
- Chasing Ghosts: The Policing of Terrorism (Oxford University Press, 2015) ISBN 978-0190237318
- The Stupidity of War : American Foreign Policy and the Case for Complacency (Cambridge University Press, 2021) ISBN 9781108843836
