= James Stimson =

American political scientist

James A. Stimson
- Born: James Allen Stimson; December 12, 1943 (age 82)
- Education: University of Minnesota; University of North Carolina at Chapel Hill
- Awards: Center for Advanced Study in the Behavioral Sciences fellowship (1994–95); Goldsmith Book Prize (for book Tides of Consent: How Public Opinion Shapes American Politics; 2006); Warren J. Mitofsky Award for Excellence in Public Opinion Research from the Roper Center for Public Opinion Research (2016)
- Scientific career
- Fields: Political science
- Institutions: University of North Carolina at Chapel Hill
- Thesis: The Diffusion of Evaluations: Patterns of Cue-taking in the United States House of Representatives (1970)
- Doctoral advisor: Donald Matthews

James Allen Stimson (born December 12, 1943) is an American political scientist and the Raymond Dawson Distinguished Bicentennial Professor of Political Science Emeritus at the University of North Carolina at Chapel Hill. After teaching at the University at Buffalo and Florida State University, among other institutions, he joined the faculty of the University of North Carolina at Chapel Hill in 1997, remaining there until his retirement in 2018. A fellow of the American Academy of Arts and Sciences, he served as a fellow of the Center for Advanced Study in the Behavioral Sciences from 1994 to 1995 and as a Guggenheim Fellow from 2006 to 2007. He has received the Eulau and Kammerer Awards from the American Political Science Association, as well as the Chastain Award from the Southern Political Science Association. In 2016, he received the Warren J. Mitofsky Award for Excellence in Public Opinion Research from the Board of Directors of the Roper Center for Public Opinion Research.
