= Goldsmith Book Prize =

The Goldsmith Book Prize is a literary award for books published in the United States.

== Description ==
The award is meant to recognize works that "[improve] government through an examination of the intersection between press, politics, and public policy." The prize is awarded to the book published in the previous year that best exemplifies the fulfillment of this goal. The first such prize was awarded in 1993. The program was expanded in 2002 to include two separate book prizes, for trade and academic works.

The Goldsmith Awards Program, launched in 1991, is based at the Shorenstein Center on Media, Politics and Public Policy at the John F. Kennedy School of Government, a part of Harvard University. The center also gives out the Goldsmith Prize for Investigative Reporting, and the Goldsmith Career Award for Excellence in Journalism.

== Book Prize winners ==
- 2025

Academic: Adam Berinsky, Political Rumors: Why We Accept Misinformation and How to Fight It
Trade: Laura Beers, Orwell’s Ghosts: Wisdom and Warnings for the Twenty-First Century

- 2024

Academic: Anita Gohdes, Repression in the Digital Age: Surveillance, Censorship, and the Dynamics of State Violence
Trade: Sander van der Linden, Foolproof: Why Misinformation Infects Our Minds and How to Build Immunity

- 2023

Academic: Danny Hayes and Jennifer L. Lawless, News Hole: The Demise of Local Journalism and Political Engagement
Trade: Deborah Cohen, Last Call at the Hotel Imperial: The Reporters Who Took On a World At War

- 2022

Academic: Karen Mossberger, Caroline Tolbert, and Scott J. LaCombe, Choosing the Future: Technology and Opportunity in Communities
Trade: Elizabeth Becker, You Don’t Belong Here: How Three Women Rewrote the Story of War

- 2021

Academic: John Maxwell Hamilton, Manipulating the Masses: Woodrow Wilson and the Birth of American Propaganda
Trade: Stephen Bates, An Aristocracy of Critics: Luce, Hutchins, Niebuhr, and the Committee That Redefined Freedom of the Press

- 2020

No award given

- 2019

Academic: Matthew Hindman, The Internet Trap: How the Digital Economy Builds Monopolies and Undermines Democracy
Margaret E. Roberts, Censored: Distraction and Diversion Inside China’s Great Firewall
Trade: Steven Levitsky and Daniel Ziblatt, How Democracies Die

- 2018

No award given

- 2017

Academic: James T. Hamilton, Democracy’s Detectives: The Economics of Investigative Journalism
Trade: David Greenberg, Republic of Spin: An Inside History of the American Presidency

- 2016

Academic: Erik Albæk, Arjen van Dalen, Nael Jebril and Claes H. de Vreese, Political Journalism in Comparative Perspective
Trade: Harold Holzer, Lincoln and the Power of the Press: The War for Public Opinion

- 2015

Academic: Daniela Stockmann, Media Commercialization and Authoritarian Rule in China
Trade: Andrew Pettegree, The Invention of News: How the World Came to Know about Itself

- 2014

Academic: Kevin Arceneaux and Martin Johnson, Changing Minds or Changing Channels? Partisan News in an Age of Choice
Matthew Levendusky, How Partisan Media Polarize America
Trade: Jaron Lanier, Who Owns the Future?

- 2013

Academic: Jonathan M. Ladd, Why Americans Hate the Media and How It Matters
Trade: Rebecca MacKinnon, Consent of the Networked: The Worldwide Struggle for Internet Freedom

- 2012

Academic: Jeffrey E. Cohen, Going Local: Presidential Leadership in the Post-Broadcast Age
Trade: Evgeny Morozov, The Net Delusion: The Dark Side of Internet Freedom

- 2011

Academic: Tim Groeling, When Politicians Attack: Party Cohesion in the Media
Patrick J. Sellers, Cycles of Spin: Strategic Communication in the U.S. Congress
Trade: Jack Fuller, What Is Happening to the News: The Information Explosion and the Crisis in Journalism

- 2010

Academic: Matthew Hindman, The Myth of Digital Democracy
Trade: John Maxwell Hamilton, Journalism's Roving Eye: A History of American Foreign Reporting

- 2009

Academic: Markus Prior, Post-Broadcast Democracy: How Media Choice Increases Inequality in Political Involvement and Polarizes Elections.
Trade: Jane Mayer, The Dark Side: The Inside Story of How the War on Terror Turned into a War on American Ideals

- 2008

Academic: John G. Geer, In Defense of Negativity: Attack Ads in Presidential Campaigns
Trade: Ted Gup, Nation of Secrets: The Threat to Democracy and the American Way of Life

- 2007

Academic: Diana C. Mutz, Hearing the Other Side: Deliberative versus Participatory Democracy
Trade: Gene Roberts and Hank Klibanoff, The Race Beat: The Press, the Civil Rights Struggle and the Awakening of a Nation

- 2006

Academic: James A. Stimson, Tides of Consent: How Public Opinion Shapes American Politics
Trade: Geoffrey R. Stone, Perilous Times: Free Speech in Wartime from the Sedition Act of 1798 to the War on Terrorism

- 2005

Academic: Daniel C. Hallin and Paolo Mancini, Comparing Media Systems: Three Models of Media and Politics
Trade: Paul Starr, The Creation of the Media: Political Origins of Modern Communications

- 2004

Academic: Scott L. Althaus, Collective Preferences in Democratic Politics: Opinion Surveys and the Will of the People
Paul M. Kellstedt, The Mass Media and the Dynamics of American Racial Attitudes
Trade: Bill Katovsky and Timothy Carlson, Embedded: The Media at War in Iraq

- 2003

Academic: Doris Graber, Processing Politics: Learning from Television in the Internet Age
Trade: Leonard Downie, Jr. and Robert G. Kaiser, The News About the News: American Journalism in Peril

- 2002

Academic: Robert M. Entman and Andrew Rojecki, The Black Image in the White Mind
Trade: Bill Kovach and Tom Rosenstiel, The Elements of Journalism

- 2001

Lawrence R. Jacobs & Robert Y. Shapiro, Politicians Don't Pander: Political Manipulation and the Loss of Democratic Responsiveness

- 2000

Robert McChesney, Rich Media, Poor Democracy

- 1999

James Hamilton, Channeling Violence: The Economic Market for Violent Television Programming

- 1998

Richard Norton Smith, The Colonel: The Life and Legend of Robert R. McCormick, 1880-1955

- 1997

No award given

- 1996

Stephen Ansolabehere and Shanto Iyengar, Going Negative: How Political Advertisements Shrink and Polarize the Electorate

- 1995

William Hoynes, Public Television for Sale: Media, the Market and the Public Sphere

- 1994

Cass R. Sunstein, Democracy and the Problem of Free Speech

- 1993

Greg Mitchell, Campaign of the Century: Upton Sinclair's Race for Governor of California and the Birth of Media Politics

== See also ==
- List of American literary awards
- List of literary awards
