= Christina Greer =

American political scientist

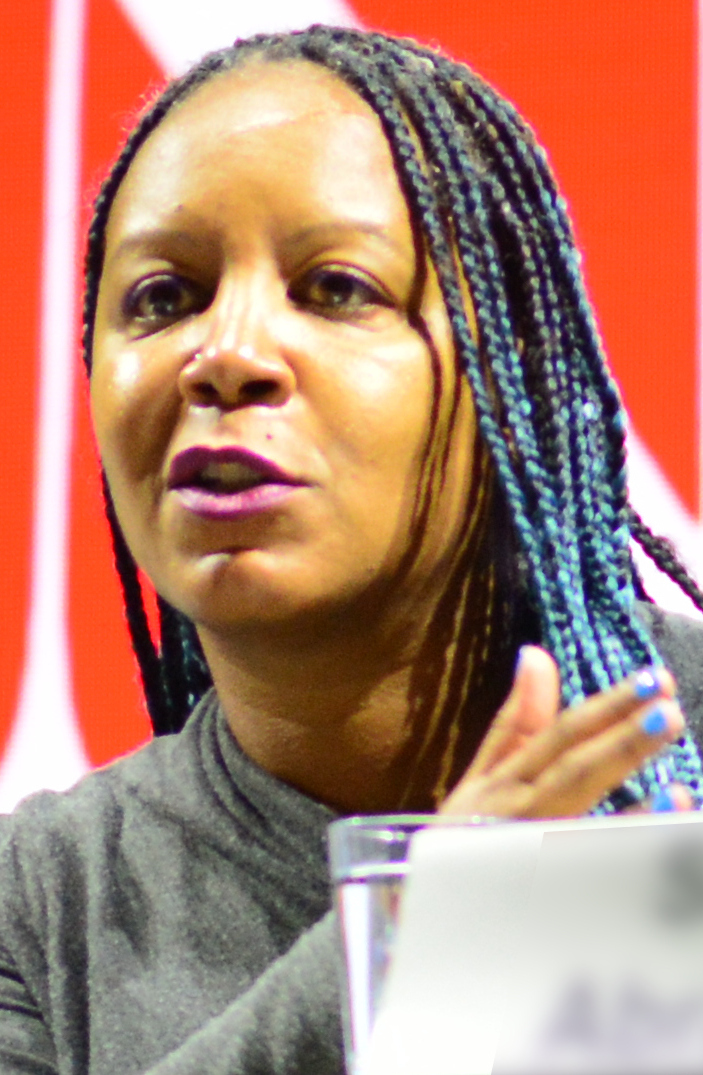
- Greer in 2023
- Education: Tufts University; Columbia University
- Scientific career
- Fields: Political science
- Workplaces: Fordham University
- Doctoral advisor: Robert Y. Shapiro

Christina M. Greer is an American political scientist who researches U.S. politics, black ethnic politics, urban politics, and public opinion. She is an associate professor of political science at Fordham University.

== Life ==
Greer was born to Gloria and Theodore Greer. She comes from four generations of teachers. Her sister is physician Florencia Greer Polite. She attended high school in the Chicago metropolitan area. Greer earned a B.A. from Tufts University. James M. Glaser introduced her to the field of political science and served as an undergraduate mentor. She completed a M.A. M.Phil. and Ph.D. in political science from Columbia Graduate School of Arts and Sciences. Her 2008 dissertation was titled, Black Ethnicity: Identity, Participation, and Policy. Robert Y. Shapiro was her doctoral advisor. During her doctoral studies, her research began to center on the intersections of race, immigration, and political behavior within the black community in the United States.

Greer began her academic career as a faculty member at Fordham University, where she became an associate professor of political science. Her teaching and research span a broad range of topics within American politics, including campaigns and elections, Congress, New York City and State politics, urban governance, and black ethnic politics. In her role, Greer analyzes the ways in which race and ethnicity intersect with political behavior, particularly in urban environments.

In 2013, Greer published her first book, Black Ethnics: Race, Immigration, and the Pursuit of the American Dream, with Oxford University Press. The book explores the increasing ethnic diversity within the black population in the United States, focusing on African and Caribbean immigrants. Greer examines how both ethnicity and a shared racial identity shape the political preferences and policy choices of black Americans. Her work has contributed to broader discussions about the complexity of black identity in the U.S. and the factors that influence the political behavior of different black ethnic groups. In addition to her work on black ethnic politics, Greer has conducted research on the history of African Americans who have run for executive offices in the United States. She is also studying the roles of mayors and public policy in urban centers, examining how political leadership influences the governance of cities. Her comparative research includes analyses of criminal activity and political responses in cities such as Boston and Baltimore.

Greer is a member on the boards of The Tenement Museum in NYC, the Human Service Council, the Center for Community Change, the Riders Alliance of New York, and she serves on the Advisory Board at Tufts, her alma mater.

Beyond her academic work, Greer is the host and producer of The Aftermath with Christina Greer, a show featured on Ozy Media, where she discusses political and social issues with a focus on current events and their historical context. Since 2018, she has also co-hosted FAQ NYC, THE CITY's podcast on New York City politics.

== Selected works ==
- Greer, Christina M. (2013). Black Ethnics: Race, Immigration, and the Pursuit of the American Dream. Oxford University Press. ISBN 978-0-19-023678-6.
- Smith, Candis Watts; Greer, Christina M., eds. (2019). Black Politics in Transition: Immigration, Suburbanization, and Gentrification. Routledge. ISBN 978-1-138-05850-7.
