= Overblown =

Overblown may mean:

- a word related to exaggerated
- "Overblown", a Mudhoney song on Singles: Original Motion Picture Soundtrack
- Overblown (book), the book Overblown: How Politicians and the Terrorism Industry Inflate National Security Threats, and Why We Believe Them by American political scientist John E. Mueller

== See also ==
- Overblowing, changing a whistle or wind instrument's pitch by increasing air pressure
