= America Against the World =

2007 book by Andrew Kohut and Bruce Stokes

- Book cover
- Author: Andrew Kohut and Bruce Stokes
- Language: English
- Genre: Non-fiction
- Publisher: Henry Holt and Company
- Publication date: May 1, 2007
- Publication place: United States
- Pages: 284
- ISBN: 978-0-8050-8305-7

America Against the World: How We Are Different and Why We Are Disliked is a non-fiction book that was written by Andrew Kohut and Bruce Stokes in 2007 about United States foreign policy and the causes of dislike of Americans in other countries. Kohut is a former president of the American Association for Public Opinion Research and the National Council on Public Polls.

The book consists of 91,000 interviews that were conducted in 50 countries and collected by the Pew Foundation and other organizations. They find that Americans are unique and the differences of viewpoint between Americans and others on a range of topics, including happiness, religious conviction and individualism, are striking. The authors said they believed anti-Americanism usually concerns US government policies, and the world had always "held Americans in higher esteem than America". But today, non-Americans are "increasingly equating the US people with the US government".

They also said they believe Americans have a different reaction to people of other nationalities in the 21st century after liberal and democratic values became important in US politics in the nineteenth century. The most significant differences between Americans and others were the ability to shape their own lives and to solve social problems by using government action. As a result, Americans have less trust in organizations like the United Nations. Kohut and Stokes relied on a contemporary assessment of Alexis de Tocqueville's ambivalent conclusion about American exceptionalism.

== Content ==
America Against the World investigates the influence of the presidency of George W. Bush in American society. In the authors' opinion, Bush is not the only person to blame for the world's poor view of the United States. According to the book, anti-Americanism is caused by the US's actions in South and Latin America, America sponsored actions in Guatemala, US participation in events in Iran in 1953 and the revolution of 1979, American support for oppression during the cold war.

Andrew Kohut and Bruce Stokes wrote that anti-Americanism had a resurgence during the George W. Bush presidency. They wrote about international anger towards Americans by sourcing interviews conducted in 50 countries collected by the Pew Foundation and other organizations. US action against terrorism makes up a part of anti-American sentiment in other countries. Kohut's Pew Research Center polls show international opinion of the United States dropped under the Bush-junior presidency; this was not from the 2001 September 11 attacks but since he won the presidency.

According to the book, anti-Americanism focuses on US government policies. According to the polls, "the American people, as opposed to some of their leaders, seek no converts to their ideology" and 60 percent of Americans consider their culture "superior to others". The Importance of America's relationship with other nations and their reactions to global events mean they are unwilling for multinational efforts and institutions, and compared with other countries' citizens they pay less attention to them.

Kohut and Stokes write that Americans are self-involved, that George W. Bush reflected the real America for others, and that changing these conditions needs a change of leaders and peoples' thoughts. "Americans think of themselves as kings and queens of the world's prom", the writers said. According to the book, American security depends on its further moral growth; "American greatness" does not need to have militaristic connotations, instead it needs exceptionalism worth aspiring to.

== Reception ==
Juliana Geran Pilon noted that the authors presented the results of the surveys conducted by the Pew Center over the course of a decade. This was backed up by Geran Pilon who believed the book was well-documented as it showed the growth of the US isolation depth through analytics and reporting. He also said that the book presented data results and reality close together that it makes the study particularly valuable. He remarked that the results on the polling of 38,000 people who are from 44 countries are exceptional.

Pilon commented that Kohut and Stokes believe that "United States" has come to mean not only US government policies, but the American people as well.

Another review, by Walter Russell Mead, suggested that Kohut and Stokes identify an enduring problem: when a significant number of individuals are opposed to the majority of the US population. Mead agreed that Americans tended to be more effective than most people in their ability to shape their own lives, as well as acceptance of the use of government action in solving world problems. Mead also suggested that Kohut and Stokes had created an accessible and understandable database, in researching their book. It was also noted that the inclusion of the results of global surveys made the book interesting.
