= Norman Bradburn =

American social scientist

Norman M. Bradburn (born 1933) is an American social scientist, survey methodologist, and academic administrator. He is the Tiffany and Margaret Blake Distinguished Service Professor Emeritus at University of Chicago and former University Provost, and an Elected Fellow of the American Academy of Political and Social Science, American Statistical Association, and American Academy of Arts and Sciences. He is the recipient of Warren J. Mitofsky Award for Excellence in Public Opinion Research from the Board of Directors of the Roper Center for Public Opinion Research at Cornell University.

== Biography ==
Bradburn was born in Lincoln, Illinois. He received a bachelor's degree from the University of Chicago in 1952 and a second bachelor's degree in philosophy, politics and economics from Oxford University in 1955. He earned a master's degree in clinical psychology in 1958 and a Ph.D. in social psychology in 1960 Harvard University.

== Career ==
Bradburn joined the University of Chicago faculty in 1960 and the National Opinion Research Center (NORC) in 1961. He became Tiffany and Margaret Blake Distinguished Service Professor in 1977 and served as provost from 1984 to 1989. He also served as associate dean of the Division of the Social Sciences (1971–1973) and chair of the Department of Behavioral Sciences from 1973 to 1979.

Bradburn directed NORC during three periods: 1967–1971, 1979–1984 and 1989–1992. From 2000 to 2004, he was assistant director for Social, Behavioral and Economic Sciences at the National Science Foundation. He chaired the National Research Council’s Committee on National Statistics from 1993 to 1998 and was president of the American Association for Public Opinion Research from 1991 to 1992.

== Research and works ==
Bradburn's research has focused on survey methodology and the measurement of psychological and social phenomena. His early work examined psychological well-being and quality of life through survey research. His later work addressed questionnaire design, question wording, response and interviewer effects, memory, and sources of measurement error. He also studied how respondents interpret survey questions and how interview conditions influence their answers.

His research examined response effects in surveys, including the influence of question wording and order, interview conditions, and interviewer and respondent characteristics on results. He also studied the application of cognitive psychology to survey methodology and the use of surveys to measure subjective states and social conditions.

Bradburn's works include The Structure of Psychological Well-Being (1970), Response Effects in Surveys: A Review and Synthesis (1974), Improving Interview Method and Questionnaire Design (1979), Asking Questions: A Practical Guide to Questionnaire Construction (1982), Polls and Surveys: Understanding What They Tell Us (1988), and Thinking About Answers: The Application of Cognitive Processes to Survey Methodology (1996). His books on survey methodology were co- written with Seymour Sudman; Thinking About Answers was co-authored with Sudman and Norbert Schwarz.

Bradburn has served as project director and co-principal investigator of the Humanities Indicators, a project of the American Academy of Arts and Sciences that collects and analyzes data on the humanities in the United States. The project covers humanities education, employment, the workforce, public engagement, and participation in cultural activities.

Bradburn developed the Bradburn Affect Balance Scale, a measure of psychological well-being introduced in his 1969 book The Structure of Psychological Well-Being. The scale measures subjective well-being through questions concerning positive and negative affect.

== Awards ==
- John Harvard Scholarship, Harvard University (1954)
- U.S. Public Health Fellowship (1957–1958)
- Walker-Beale Scholarship, Harvard Graduate School of Business (1959–1960)
- Fellow, Alexander von Humboldt Foundation (1970–1971)
- Helen Dinerman Award, World Association for Public Opinion Research (1985)
- Award from the American Association for Public Opinion Research (1987)
- Elected to the American Academy of Arts and Sciences (1994)
- Norman Maclean Lifetime Teaching Award, University of Chicago (2001)
- Waksberg Prize, Statistics Canada and the American Statistical Association (2004)
- Mitofsky Award, Roper Center for Public Opinion Research (2010)
