= Julia Lane =

New Zealand economist and economic statistician

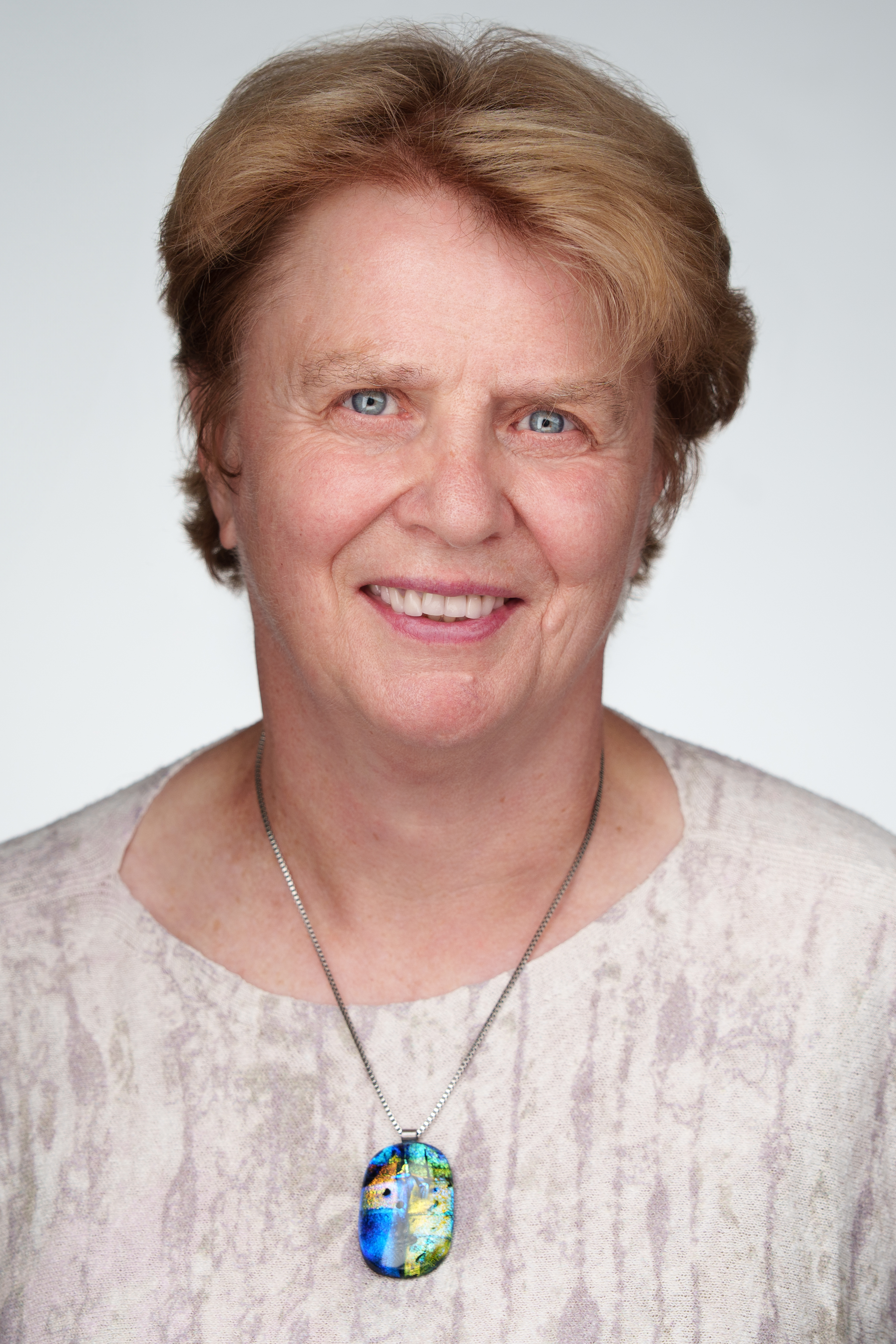

Academic background
- Education: Massey University (BA); University of Missouri (MA); University of Missouri(PhD)

Academic work
- Discipline: Labor economics Data science Public policy
- Institutions: New York University
- Notable ideas: Data infrastructure development Administrative data use in policy Science of science policy
- Awards: Fellow of the American Association for the Advancement of Science; Fellow of the International Statistical Institute; Fellow of the American Statistical Association

Julia Ingrid Lane (born 1956) is an English-born New Zealand economist and data scientist specializing in labor economics research, the creation of public data infrastructures, and the foundations of evidence-based policymaking. She is Professor Emerita at the Robert F. Wagner Graduate School of Public Service at New York University (NYU), where she also served a three year term as a Provostial Fellow for Innovation Analytics.

== Early life and education ==
Lane has triple citizenship in the United States, the United Kingdom, and New Zealand. Lane received her undergraduate degree in economics and Japanese from Massey University in 1977. She later earned a master's degree in statistics and a Ph.D. in economics from the University of Missouri, completing both by 1982. Her early academic career included positions at Western Illinois University and the University of Louisville, where she established the Center for Business and Economic Research and began publishing on labor markets and productivity.

== Career ==
In 1990, Lane moved to Washington, D.C. as an Assistant, and then Associate and Full Professor of Economics at American University. She also began consulting for the World Bank, focusing on education and labor policy evaluation in developing countries. Her work analyzed the returns to education in India, Morocco, and the Philippines, and she co-led a major skills development project for Malaysia. In 1996 she was awarded a two-year National Science Foundation/American Statistical Association fellowship to work at the US Census Bureau to investigate the potential to develop a linked employer-employee dataset to better understand labor market dynamics. She conceived of using state unemployment insurance wage records to produce indicators of value to both the Census Bureau and state agencies, and ensure that confidentiality was protected. She was integral to the subsequent establishment of the Longitudinal Employer–Household Dynamics (LEHD) program at the U.S. Census Bureau. The program, which links employer and employee data for labor market research, became a permanent federal initiative. She left American University for the Urban Institute in order to fully establish the initiative, in 2000 and, she served as Director of the Employment Dynamics Program at the Urban Institute until 2004.

She served in two terms between 2004–2005 and 2008–2012, at the National Science Foundation (NSF). As Senior Program Director for the Science of Science and Innovation Policy program, she led the development of the STAR METRICS initiative, a federal effort to track the outcomes of public investment in science, and conceptualized the ScienCV researcher profile system.

From 2005 to 2008, Lane served as Senior Vice President at NORC at the University of Chicago, where she initiated and developed the first secure remote-access platforms for federal data, the NORC remote access data enclave. Between 2012 and 2015, she worked at the American Institutes for Research (AIR) as a Senior Managing Economist, co-founding the PatentsView project and helping to establish the Institute for Research on Innovation and Science (IRIS) at the University of Michigan.

In 2015, Lane joined NYU as a Professor of Public Service and Provostial Fellow. She led the development of Administrative Data Research Facility (ADRF), the Democratizing Data platform, and the Applied Data Analytics training series in partnership with Frauke Kreuter and Rayid Ghani. She also designed and launched a certificate in data literacy and evidence building which was jointly sponsored by NYU and the University of Maryland.

Lane also founded the Coleridge Initiative, which works with U.S. government agencies to provide secure infrastructure and training for using administrative data in policy evaluation. The Coleridge Initiative was spun off from NYU as a not-for-profit company in 2020, and she served as its CEO until 2021.

== Government and policy service ==
From January 2024 to January 2025, Lane was the Senior Policy Advisor at the National Institute of Standards and Technology, advising on implementation of the Presidential Executive Order on Artificial Intelligence. She previously served as Senior Advisor to the Federal CIO in the Office of Management and Budget, contributing to the development of the Federal Data Strategy (2019–2021).

Lane was appointed to the National AI Research Resource Task Force (2021–2023), the Advisory Committee on Data for Evidence Building (2020–2022), and the Secretary of Labor's Workforce Innovation Advisory Council (2023–2026). Earlier, she co-chaired the Science of Science Policy Interagency Group under the White House's National Science and Technology Council.

== Awards and honors ==
Lane is an elected Fellow of the American Statistical Association (2009), the American Association for the Advancement of Science, the International Statistical Institute, and the National Academy of Public Administration (2023). In 2025, she received the Society of Labor Economists Prize for Contributions to Data and Measurement. Other honors include the Julius Shiskin and Roger Herriot Awards (2014), the Warren E. Miller Award from ICPSR (2017), the Government Innovation Award for ADRF (2018), and recognition as a Distinguished Fellow by the New Zealand Association of Economists (2018).

== Selected publications ==
=== Books ===
Lane has authored or edited over a dozen books and more than 80 refereed journal articles. Her 2020 book, Democratizing Our Data: A Manifesto (MIT Press), called for greater transparency and equity in public data systems and was widely reviewed in journals and outlets such as Nature, Monthly Labor Review, and Engadget. Earlier co-authored works include:

- Where Are All the Good Jobs Going? (2011),
- Economic Turbulence (2006),
- Moving Up or Moving On (2005), and
- Big Data and Social Science (2016, 2020)

=== Articles ===
- Lane, Julia; Owen-Smith, Jason; Weinberg, Bruce A. (10 June 2024), "How to track the economic impact of public investments in AI", Nature, 630 (8016): 302–304, Bibcode:2024Natur.630..302L, doi:10.1038/d41586-024-01721-1, ISSN 0028-0836, PMID 38858482
- Lane, Julia; Spector, Alfred; Stebbins, Michael (2 April 2024), "An Invisible Hand for Creating Public Value From Data", Harvard Data Science Review, 4 (Special Issue 4) 19804, Bibcode:2024HDSRv...419804L, doi:10.1162/99608f92.03719804
- Ross, Matthew B.; Glennon, Britta M.; Murciano-Goroff, Raviv; Berkes, Enrico G.; Weinberg, Bruce A.; Lane, Julia I. (2022), "Women are credited less in science than men", Nature, 608 (7921): 135–145, Bibcode:2022Natur.608..135R, doi:10.1038/s41586-022-04966-w, ISSN 1476-4687, PMC 9352587, PMID 35732238
- "Notes", Democratizing Our Data, The MIT Press, 1 September 2020, pp. 143–166, doi:10.7551/mitpress/11990.003.0009, ISBN 978-0-262-35969-6
- Lane, Julia; Gimeno, Ernesto; Levitskaya, Ekaterina; Zhang, Zheyuan; Zigoni, Alberto (28 April 2022), "Data Inventories for the Modern Age? Using Data Science to Open Government Data", Harvard Data Science Review, doi:10.1162/99608f92.8a3f2336
