= Roper Center for Public Opinion Research =

US archive of social science data

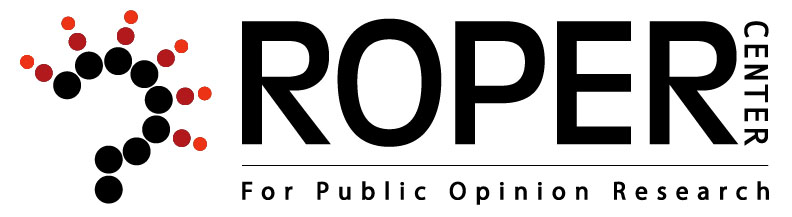
- Roper Center Logo
- Formation: 1947
- Founder: Elmo Roper
- Legal status: Non-profit
- Headquarters: Ithaca, NY
- Location: Cornell University
- Executive director: Jonathon P. Schuldt
- Chair: Robert Y. Shapiro
- Board of directors: Roper Center Board of Directors
- Website: Roper Center for Public Opinion Research

The Roper Center for Public Opinion Research at Cornell University is the world's oldest archive of social science data and the largest specializing in data from public opinion surveys. Its collection includes over 27,000 datasets and more than 855,000 questions with responses in Roper iPoll, adding hundreds more each year. The archive contains responses from millions of individuals on a vast range of topics. The current executive director of the center is Jonathon P. Schuldt, Associate Professor of Communication at Cornell University, with a governing board of directors chaired by Robert Y. Shapiro of Columbia University.

The Roper Center focuses on surveys conducted by the news media and commercial polling firms; however, it also holds many academic surveys, including historical collections from Gallup, Pew Research Center, the National Opinion Research Center and Princeton University's Office of Public Opinion Research.

The Roper Center maintains cooperative relationships with other archives around the world. Its board of directors includes representatives from academic and commercial public opinion research. The Roper Center moved from the University of Connecticut to Cornell University in 2015.

== Warren J. Mitofsky Award ==
The Warren J. Mitofsky Award for Excellence in Public Opinion Research is named in honor of Warren Mitofsky. Previous winners:

- 2007: John Mueller
- 2008: Robert Blendon
- 2009: Robert Wuthnow
- 2010: James A. Davis
- 2011: Kathleen Frankovic
- 2012: Norman Bradburn
- 2013: Eric Schickler and Adam Berinsky
- 2014: Andrew Kohut
- 2015: Daniel Yankelovich
- 2016: James Stimson
- 2017: Howard Schuman, Emeritus Professor at the University of Michigan, where he began his teaching career in 1964, and Emeritus research scientist at the University of Michigan’s Institute for Social Research’s Survey Research Center
- 2018: Mollyann Brodie, Senior Vice President for Executive Operations and Executive Director, Public Opinion and Survey Research, at the Henry J. Kaiser Family Foundation (KFF)
- 2019: Patricia Moy, Christy Cressey Professor of Communication and Associate Vice Provost for Academic and Student Affairs at the University of Washington
- 2020: Karlyn Bowman, Senior Fellow at the American Enterprise Institute
- 2021: Lawrence D. Bobo, Dean of Social Science and the W. E. B. Du Bois Professor of the Social Sciences at Harvard University
- 2022: Kathleen Hall Jamieson, Elizabeth Ware Packard Professor at the Annenberg School for Communication of the University of Pennsylvania and director of the university’s Annenberg Public Policy Center, where she co-founded FactCheck.org
- 2023: Diane Colasanto, former Gallup chief methodologist and senior vice president and 1996-1997 AAPOR president
- 2024: Michael Traugott, Professor Emeritus of Communication and Political Science at the University of Michigan

== Student Fellowships ==
The Roper Center awards 3 student fellowships:

- Kohut Research Fellows: for undergraduate and graduate students
- Mitofsky Graduate Research Fellows: for Cornell University doctoral students
- W.E.B. Du Bois Fellowship in Support of Diversity and Inclusion, a joint project with the American Association for Public Opinion Research

== See also ==
- Public opinion
- Opinion poll
- National Digital Information Infrastructure and Preservation Program
- Data curation
- Digital preservation
- LAPOP
- Arab Barometer
