= Frauke Kreuter =

German sociologist and statistician

Frauke Kreuter is a German sociologist and statistician. She is a professor of the Joint Program in Survey Methodology (JPSM) of the University of Maryland, College Park and a professor in statistics and data science at LMU Munich, Germany. Her research in survey methodology includes work on sampling error and observational error.

== Biography ==
Kreuter earned a diploma in sociology from the University of Mannheim in 1996. She received her doctorate (Dr. rer. soc.) in 2001 from the University of Konstanz under the supervision of Rainer Schnell. After postdoctoral research and an adjunct position at the University of California, Los Angeles, she moved to Maryland in 2004 and joined JPSM as an assistant professor. From 2010 to 2014 she was University Professor of Statistics at LMU Munich, while maintaining her position at the University of Maryland as an associate professor. She also became head of the Statistical Methods Research Department at the Institute for Employment Research (IAB) in Nuremberg, Germany in 2010. In 2014 she was promoted to full professor at Maryland and moved her German position to the University of Mannheim. From 2016 to 2020, she was director of JPSM in Maryland. She also founded the International Program for Survey and Data Science (IPSDS) at LMU Munich, Germany, and co-founded the Coleridge Initiative.

== Publications ==
She is the author or co-author of several books, including Data Analysis Using Stata (3rd ed., Stata Press, 2012, with Ulrich Kohler), Practical Tools for Designing and Weighting Survey Samples (Springer, 2013, with Richard Valliant and Jill Dever) and Big Data and Social Science - Data Science Methods and Tools for Research and Practice (2nd ed., CRC Press, 2021, with Ian Foster, Rayid Ghani, Ron S. Jarmin, and Julia Lane).

== Awards and honors ==
Kreuter was the 2013 winner of the Gertrude Cox Award, given jointly by the Washington Statistical Society and RTI International. In 2014 she was elected as a Fellow of the American Statistical Association "for outstanding contributions to research in the field of survey methodology; for excellence in mentoring of junior researchers in social statistics and survey methodology; and for extensive international research collaborations." She was awarded the Warren Mitofsky Innovators Award of the American Association for Public Opinion Research in 2020, and served as the association's president in 2025.

== Other ==
Kreuter also hosts the German language podcast #digdeep with Dr. Christof Horn, where they discuss the trends and impact of digitalization.
