= Robert Blendon =

American academic

- Died: 2026
- Citizenship: USA
- Education: Marietta College, School of Public Health of Johns Hopkins University (ScD)
- Spouse: Marie C. McCormick
- Scientific career
- Fields: Public Health
- Workplaces: Harvard T.H. Chan School of Public Health
- Thesis: (1969)

Robert J. Blendon was an American academic who was the Richard L. Menschel Professor of Public Health and Professor of Health Policy and Political Analysis, Emeritus and former Director for the Division of Policy Translation and Leadership Development at the Harvard T.H. Chan School of Public Health. He previously held appointments as a Professor of Health Policy and Political Analysis at the Harvard T.H. Chan School of Public Health and the Harvard Kennedy School of Government. He formerly directed the Harvard Opinion Research Program and co-directed the Robert Wood Johnson Foundation/Harvard T.H. Chan School of Public Health project on understanding Americans’ Health Agenda. Previously, he co-directed a polling series with The Washington Post and Kaiser Family Foundation.

Blendon also co-directed a survey project for the Minneapolis Star Tribune on health care that received the National Press Club’s 1998 Award for Consumer Journalism. He also co-directed a project for National Public Radio and the Henry J. Kaiser Family Foundation on American attitudes toward domestic policy. The series was cited by the National Journal as setting a new standard for use of public opinion surveys in broadcast journalism. In 2008, Blendon received the Warren J. Mitofsky Award for Excellence in Public Opinion Research from the Board of Directors of the Roper Center for Public Opinion Research at Cornell University.

== Education ==
Blendon was a graduate of Marietta College and of the School of Business at the University of Chicago, with a Masters in Business Administration. In addition, he holds a Doctoral degree (DSc) from the School of Public Health of Johns Hopkins University (1969), where his principal attention was directed toward health policy.

== Career ==
Blendon was senior vice-president at the Robert Wood Johnson Foundation. In addition, he served as a senior faculty member for the U.S. Conference of Mayors, the National Governors' Association, and the U.S. Congress Committee on Ways and Means.

Between 1987 and 1996, Blendon served as Chairman of the Department of Health Policy and Management at the Harvard T.H. Chan School of Public Health and as Deputy Director of the Harvard University Division of Health Policy Research and Education.

Blendon formerly taught a course on Political Strategy in U.S. Health Policy at the Harvard Kennedy School of Government and the Harvard T.H. Chan School of Public Health. He also directed the Political Analysis track in the University’s Ph.D. Program in Health Policy.

For 2023 and 2024, Blendon was a Senior Fellow at the Bipartisan Policy Center in Washington, DC.

== Affiliations and awards ==
Blendon was a member of the National Academy of Medicine, of the National Academy of Sciences and of the Council on Foreign Relations, a former member of the advisory board to the Director of the Centers for Disease Control and Prevention, and a former member of the editorial board of the Journal of the American Medical Association. He was also a Past President of what is now the Academy of Health and winner of their Distinguished Investigator Award. He was also a recipient of the Baxter Award for lifetime achievement in the health services research field. He also received the John M. Eisenberg Excellence in Mentorship Award from the Agency for Healthcare Research and Quality (AHRQ) and the Mendelsohn award from Harvard University. In 2008, he was also the recipient of the Warren J. Mitofsky Award for Excellence in Public Opinion Research given by the Roper Center.

== Personal life ==
Blendon was married to Marie McCormick, a Professor Emerita at the Harvard T.H. Chan School of Public Health in Boston, Massachusetts, and lived in Boca Raton, Florida. Blendon passed away on June 17, 2026.
