= Adam Berinsky =

American political scientist

Adam J. Berinsky (born 1970) is the Mitsui Professor of Political Science at the Massachusetts Institute of Technology and a Faculty Affiliate at the MIT Institute for Data, Systems, and Society (IDSS). He is a specialist in political behavior and public opinion. He is the founding director of the MIT Political Experiments Research Lab (PERL).

== Personal life ==
Berinsky is the son of Burton Berinsky, an American writer, photographer, and hat designer.

== Education ==
A graduate of Hunter College High School in New York City, Berinsky completed his undergraduate education at Wesleyan University and received his Ph.D. from the University of Michigan Department of Political Science in 2000.

== Research ==
Berinsky's early work examined public opinion and political participation, with particular attention to survey methodology and non-response bias. His 2004 book Silent Voices argued that standard public opinion polls systematically exclude the voices of marginalized Americans, distorting apparent public consensus.

His research on foreign-policy opinion, collected in In Time of War (2009), drew on historical polling data from World War II through the Iraq War to examine how wartime rhetoric shapes public attitudes.

Beginning around 2009, Berinsky turned his attention to political rumors and misinformation. His research has used large-scale survey experiments to study why false beliefs persist even after correction, who is most susceptible to misinformation, and which interventions most effectively reduce its spread. With collaborators, he has conducted field experiments on Facebook (N=33 million) and Twitter showing that simple accuracy prompts delivered as digital advertisements reduce misinformation sharing. He has also studied AI-generated content, including the effectiveness of labeling strategies for synthetic media, and content moderation policy.

Berinsky has received multiple grants from the National Science Foundation and was a Fellow at the Center for Advanced Study in the Behavioral Sciences. He is also leading a project to rehabilitate and digitize historical polling data from the 1930s–1950s.

== Books ==
- Silent Voices: Public Opinion and Political Participation in America (Princeton University Press, 2004)
- In Time of War: Understanding American Public Opinion from World War II to Iraq (University of Chicago Press, 2009)
- New Directions in Public Opinion (Routledge, 3rd ed., 2019) — edited volume
- Target Estimation and Adjustment Weighting for Survey Nonresponse and Sampling Bias (Cambridge University Press, 2020) — co-authored with Devin Caughey, Sara Chatfield, Erin Hartman, Eric Schickler, and Jasjeet Sekhon
- Political Rumors: Why We Accept Misinformation and How to Fight It (Princeton University Press, 2023)

== Awards and fellowships ==
- Fellow, Center for Advanced Study in the Behavioral Sciences
- Warren J. Mitofsky Award for Excellence in Public Opinion Research, Roper Center for Public Opinion Research at Cornell University (2013)
- John Simon Guggenheim Memorial Foundation Fellow (2016), to study how political rumors spread and how they can be effectively debunked
- Andrew Carnegie Fellow (2025)

== Policy engagement ==
In 2016, Berinsky was retained by the Finnish government to train staff in countering Russian disinformation. He has also briefed senior members of the Swedish government, senior State Department officials, officials at the Department of Homeland Security, and the U.S. Department of Defense Strategic Multilayer Assessment program on strategies to combat misinformation. He has spoken to divisions at Facebook, Google, and Twitter, as well as the American Society for Virology and the American Board of Internal Medicine Foundation, about the implications of his research.
