= Andrew Kohut =

American pollster and nonpartisan news commentator

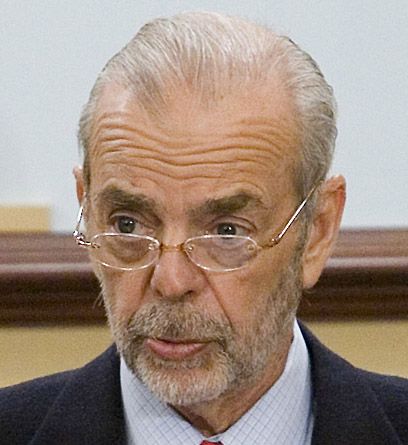
- Andrew Kohut at Miller Center, 2011
- Born: September 2, 1942; Newark, New Jersey, U.S.
- Died: September 8, 2015 (aged 73); Baltimore, Maryland, U.S.
- Education: Seton Hall University; Rutgers University
- Occupation: Pollster
- Notable work: America Against the World (2007)
- Title: Founding director of the Pew Research Center, Director of the Pew Research Center's Global Attitudes Project
- Awards: Warren J. Mitofsky Award for Excellence in Public Opinion Research from the Roper Center for Public Opinion Research (2014)

Andrew Kohut (September 2, 1942 – September 8, 2015) was an American pollster and nonpartisan news commentator about public affairs topics. He was the founding director of the Pew Research Center.

== Life and career ==
He was born in Newark, New Jersey, and was raised in Rochelle Park, New Jersey. His parents were Peter, a glassblower, and Lena, who worked in manufacturing jobs. He received a Bachelor of Arts degree from Seton Hall University in 1964 and did graduate study in sociology at Rutgers University from 1964-66.

Kohut was the founding director of the Pew Research Center and served as director of the Pew Research Center's Global Attitudes Project.

Kohut served as the center's president from 2004 to 2012 and directed the Pew Research Center for the People & the Press from 1993 to 2012. Kohut was a regular guest on National Public Radio, television news programs such as PBS NewsHour, and the editorial pages of major newspapers like The New York Times, where he presented Pew's poll results and analysis.

From 1979-1989, Kohut was president of the Gallup Organization, and in 1989 he founded Princeton Survey Research Associates, an attitude and opinion research firm specializing in media, politics and public policy. He was a past president of the American Association for Public Opinion Research and the National Council on Public Polls. His essays appeared in the op-ed section of The New York Times and he was a regular columnist for the Columbia Journalism Review and AOL News. Kohut was the co-author of four books, most recently America Against the World (Times Books).

In 2000, he won the New York AAPOR Chapter Award for Outstanding Contribution to Opinion Research, and in 2005 he was awarded the American Association of Public Opinion Research’s Award for Exceptionally Distinguished Achievement, that organization’s highest honor. In 2014, Kohut received the Warren J. Mitofsky Award for Excellence in Public Opinion Research from the board of directors of the Roper Center for Public Opinion Research at Cornell University.

Kohut died of chronic lymphocytic leukemia on September 8, 2015, six days after his 73rd birthday.
