= Afghan Center for Socio-economic and Opinion Research =

Afghan commercial market and opinion research agency

Coordinates: 34°32′39.725″N 69°10′14.707″E

The Afghan Center for Socio-economic and Opinion Research (ACSOR or ACSOR-Surveys) is a commercial market and opinion research agency based in Kabul, Afghanistan. It was founded in 2003 by D3 Systems and TNS BBSS. The agency has had collaborations with USAID, the Asia Foundation, and the American Association for Public Opinion Research.
