= Marie McCormick =

American pediatrician

- Born: 7 January 1946 (age 80); Coventry, Rhode Island
- Citizenship: United States
- Education: B.A., 1967, Emmanuel College, Boston, Massachusetts; M.D., 1971, Johns Hopkins Medical School, Baltimore, Maryland; Sc.D., 1978, Johns Hopkins School of Hygiene and Public Health, Baltimore, Maryland
- Alma mater: Johns Hopkins Medical School (MD, 1971), Johns Hopkins School of Hygiene and Public Health (ScD, 1978)
- Occupations: Pediatrician, epidemiologist, professor of public health
- Years active: 1956 to present
- Employer: Harvard T.H. Chan School of Public Health
- Known for: Epidemiology and health services in relation to infant mortality and outcomes of very low birthweight and otherwise high-risk neonates. She served on all four phases of the Infant Health and Development Program (IHDP), a large national randomized clinical trial of an early intervention program for low birth weight, premature infants funded by the Robert Wood Johnson Foundation, the largest longitudinal multisite randomized trials of early childhood educational intervention for low birth weight (LBW) and high-risk infants, and was the Principal Investigator of Phase IV of the program.
- Spouse: Robert J. Blendon, DSc
- Relatives: Parents: Atty. Richard J. McCormick, Jr. and Clare B. (Keleher) McCormick; Siblings: Martha E. McCormick Watson (married to David Watson, Roslindale), Richard J. McCormick, III (married to Susan B., Methuen), and the late Anne M. McCormick.

Marie Clare McCormick (born 1946) is an American pediatrician and Sumner and Esther Feldberg Professor of Maternal and Child Health in the Department of Social and Behavioral Sciences at Harvard T.H. Chan School of Public Health in Boston, Massachusetts. She also holds an appointment as professor of pediatrics in the Harvard Medical School. In addition, she is the senior associate for academic affairs in the department of neonatology at the Beth Israel Deaconess Medical Center. Her research primarily focused on epidemiology and health services, particularly in relation to infant mortality and the outcomes of very low birthweight (VLBW) and otherwise high-risk neonates.

== Early life ==
Marie McCormick is the daughter of Clare B. (Keleher) McCormick and Atty. Richard J. McCormick, Jr. of Haverhill, Massachusetts, where she spent her youth and attended St. James (Roman Catholic) Church. She had three siblings. Her mother's first name became Marie's middle name.

== Education ==
McCormick is a graduate of Emmanuel College (B.A., 1967) and the Johns Hopkins School of Medicine, Baltimore, Maryland (M.D., 1971). She completed a Pediatric residency/fellowship at Johns Hopkins Hospital during which she also completed a second doctorate at the Johns Hopkins School of Hygiene and Public Health in health services research (Sc.D., 1978). She has held academic positions at the Abraham Lincoln School of Medicine of the University of Illinois, the Johns Hopkins School of Public Health, and the University of Pennsylvania School of Medicine.

== Career ==
McCormick, who is licensed to practice pediatric medicine in Massachusetts, joined the Harvard Medical School in 1987 as associate professor of pediatrics and director of the Infant Follow-up Program at Boston Children's Hospital. In 1992, she was selected to be the chair of the Department of Maternal and Child Health at the Harvard School of Public Health, which position she held until 2003 when the department was merged with another to create the now Department of Social and Behavioral Sciences. She is the director of a standing training program in maternal and child health, which has had sustained federal funding for over 60 years, and she teaches the foundational course in this topic at Harvard Chan.

McCormick is internationally recognized for her research in the outcomes of high-risk infants, especially preterm infants, and the evaluation of programs to improve their outcomes. She was co-principal investigator of a national demonstration program to assess the effect of regionalizing perinatal services to improve neonatal mortality. In addition, she was a major contributor, in a variety of roles and principal investigator of the follow-up at 18 years of age, to the Infant Health and Development Program, a controlled trial of and early childhood educational intervention for preterm, low birth weight infants.

While she is a member of several professional societies, her most active roles have been in the Academic Pediatric Association where she now holds the position of Senior Associate Editor for the journal, Academic Pediatrics, and in the Institute of Medicine/National Academy of Medicine to which she was elected a member in 1997. She has chaired several significant committees for the latter including the Committee on Perinatal Transmission of HIV, and, most recently, the Committee on the Health Effects of Marijuana. However, her most important role was a chair of the Committee on Immunization Safety, which issued, among others, three reports noting no association of immunizations with autism, a role for which she received the David Rall Medal from the Institute of Medicine for exceptional committee service. She continued her work on vaccine safety as a member of the National Vaccine Advisory Committee where she chaired the Working Group to assess the safety of the 2009 Epidemic H1N1 Influenza Vaccine.

== Publications ==
McCormick has published twelve (12) books and monographs, as well as over 280 scientific papers, reviews, editorials, reports, and abstracts.

- Search Results for author McCormick MC on PubMed, accessed 03/06/2018 02:31:02 AM UTC
- Marie C. McCormick, MD, ScD; Sam Shapiro; Barbara H. Starfield, MD, MPH. The Regionalization of Perinatal ServicesSummary of the Evaluation of a National Demonstration Program. February 8, 1985. JAMA. 1985;253(6):799-804. doi:10.1001/jama.1985.03350300087026 10.1001/jama.1985.03350300087026, accessed 03/06/2018 02:31:02 AM UTC
- McCormick MC, Shapiro S, Starfield BH. The regionalization of perinatal services. Summary of the evaluation of a national demonstration program. JAMA. 1985 Feb 8;253(6):799-804. 2578581, accessed 03/06/2018 02:31:02 AM UTC
- Marie C. McCormick, Jeanne Brooks-Gunn, Stephen L. Buka, Julie Goldman, Jennifer Yu, Mikhail Salganik, David T. Scott, Forrest C. Bennett, Libby L. Kay, Judy C. Bernbaum, Charles R. Bauer, Camilia Martin, Elizabeth R. Woods, Anne Martin, Patrick H. Casey. Early Intervention in Low Birth Weight Premature Infants: Results at 18 Years of Age for the Infant Health and Development Program. Pediatrics. March 2006, Volume 117, Issue 3. 10.1542/peds.2005-1316, accessed 03/06/2018 02:31:02 AM UTC
- McCormick MC, Brooks-Gunn J, Buka SL, Goldman J, Yu J, Salganik M, Scott DT, Bennett FC, Kay LL, Bernbaum JC, Bauer CR, Martin C, Woods ER, Martin A, Casey PH. Early intervention in low birth weight premature infants: results at 18 years of age for the Infant Health and Development Program. Pediatrics. 2006 Mar;117(3):771-80. 16510657, accessed 03/06/2018 02:31:02 AM UTC

== Personal life ==
Marie McCormick is married to Robert J. Blendon, DSc, also a faculty member at the Harvard T.H. Chan School of Public Health. They live in Waban, Massachusetts.

== Awards, honors, and recognitions ==
- AAP Fellow, 1997
- IOM Elected Member
- Kristine Sandberg Knisely Lectureship Award, 2008
- Henry Ingersoll Bowditch Award for Excellence in Public Health, 2008
- Honorary Doctor of Humane Letters, 2006
- 2006 Douglas K. Richardson Award for Perinatal and Pediatric Healthcare Services, 2006
- David Rall Medal, Institute of Medicine, 2004
- Biomedical Science Careers Program Honor Roll, 2003
- Designated a National Associate of the National Academies in recognition of service, 2001
- A. Clifford Barger Excellence in Mentoring Award, 2001
- Elected as Fellow of the Association for Health Services Research, 1997
- Ambulatory Pediatric Association Research Award, 1996
- Sumner & Esther Feldberg Professorship, 1996
- Elected to the Johns Hopkins University Society of Scholars, 1995
- Delta Omega – Alpha Chapter, 1995
- Honorary Masters of Arts, 1991
- Henry Strong Denison Scholarship, 1971
