= Joint Program in Survey Methodology =

The Joint Program in Survey Methodology was established at the University of Maryland, College Park in 1993, a collaboration between that University, the University of Michigan, and Westat. Today JPSM offers coursework on-site and online, offering MS and Ph.D. degrees, certificate programs, and short courses on the subjects of Survey Methodology, Survey Statistics, and Data Science.

== History ==
In the early 1990s, the U.S. federal statistical system (Interagency Council on Statistical Policy) sought assistance to provide advanced training to their employees in survey statistics and methodology. Employees who had graduate degrees from traditional statistics programs lacked knowledge on the design of complex samples and developing survey instruments—interdisciplinary training which was necessary for implementing large-scale national surveys and censuses. In order to accomplish this initiative, the National Science Foundation set up a grant that would provide an initial five years of funding for a University to establish this program. The grant was awarded to the Joint Program in Survey Methodology (JPSM), a group made up by the University of Maryland, College Park, the University of Michigan, and Westat, and was headquartered at the University of Maryland, College Park. Academic courses began in Fall 1993, under the heading of the first JPSM director, sociologist Stanley Presser. The second director of JPSM, serving from 1996 to 2001 was Robert Groves, who went on to later head the US Census Bureau. In 1998, a summer internship program was added for undergraduate students which linked them to paid internships at U.S. federal statistical agencies as well as offering coursework in survey methodology. In 2000, JPSM enrolled their first Ph.D. students, in both statistical and social science concentrations of survey methodology. Survey methodologist, Roger Tourangeau, was named the director of JPSM in 2001 and served through 2011. The fourth JPSM director, Frederick Conrad, served from 2012 to 2015. JPSM is currently headed by Frauke Kreuter, who is also Professor of Statistics and Methodology at the University of Mannheim and head of the Statistical Methods Research Department at the Institute for Employment Research (IAB) in Nürnberg, Germany.

== Present ==
Currently, JPSM offers both MS and Ph.D. programs, in addition to an undergraduate minor, graduate-level certificates, online courses, and short (1-2 day) courses to meet the needs of survey professionals. In addition, JPSM offers a summer program for undergraduate students with internship placements at statistical agencies. To greater strengthen JPSM's collaboration with the federal statistical agencies, many agencies, such as the US Census Bureau, the National Center of Health Statistics, and the Bureau of Labor Statistics, have employed JPSM students as research assistants. Federal agencies also provide real world problems that are taken on by students in practicum or design seminar classes. Graduates of the JPSM programs are employed by federal agencies, by industry survey organizations, such as Westat, Mathematica Policy Research, Gallup, and the Pew Center, as well as university survey organizations such as the University of Michigan Institute for Social Research and NORC at the University of Chicago.

JPSM is also a core partner, along with the University of Mannheim (Germany), in a new International Program in Survey and Data Science (IPSDS), allowing international survey researchers to learn survey methodology courses online from international experts in the field.
