= Bud Roper =

Burns Worthington "Bud" Roper (1925–2003) was an American pollster.

He was chairman (1967–93) of Roper ASW, which was founded as Elmo Roper, Inc. by his father Elmo Roper. He was chairman (1970–94) of the Roper Center for Public Opinion Research at the University of Connecticut. He helped develop industry standards for methodology and the wording of poll questions.

Two polling controversies occurred during his career; in both cases he showed readiness to admit mistakes.
