= Perilous Times =

2004 book by Geoffrey R. Stone

Perilous Times: Free Speech in Wartime from the Sedition Act of 1798 to the War on Terrorism
- Author: Geoffrey R. Stone
- Language: English
- Genre: Non-fiction
- Published: 2004
- Publisher: WW Norton & Co Inc
- Media type: Print
- Pages: 730
- ISBN: 978-0393058802

Perilous Times: Free Speech in Wartime from the Sedition Act of 1798 to the War on Terrorism is a 2004 book by American legal scholar Geoffrey R. Stone, reviewing wartime restrictions of free speech in the United States. It received numerous awards within the fields of history, political science, and law.

== Awards ==
- Robert F. Kennedy Memorial Award for the Best Book of the Year
- Los Angeles Times Book Prize as the Best Book in History
- American Political Science Association’s Kammerer Award for the Best Book of the Year in Political Science
- Goldsmith Book Prize from the Shorenstein Center on Media, Politics and Public Policy
- Scribes Award for the Best Book of the Year in Law
