= Joseph Waksberg =

American statistician (1915–2006)

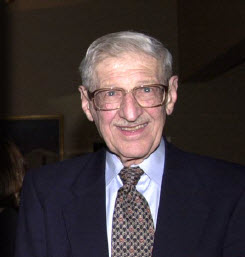
- Born: September 20, 1915; Kielce, Poland
- Died: January 10, 2006 (aged 90); Near Washington, D.C., U.S.
- Education: City College of New York, B.A. 1936
- Known for: Statistical sampling techniques
- Scientific career
- Fields: Survey sampling, Statistics
- Workplaces: US Census, Westat

Joseph Waksberg (September 20, 1915 – January 10, 2006) was an American statistician. While at the United States Census Bureau and Westat, he developed methods for area sampling and telephone sampling and made contributions in many areas of surveys and censuses.

== Early life ==
Waksberg was born in Kielce, Poland in 1915 and came to the United States in 1921 when his family immigrated. He joined the Census Bureau as a clerk in 1940. While there, he received the Department of Commerce Meritorious Service Award in 1956 and The Gold Medal Award in 1968. While at the Census Bureau, he worked closely with Morris Hansen, one of survey sampling’s founders. Among the other clerks at the Census Bureau were Benjamin Tepping, Joseph Steinberg, Samuel Greenhouse, William N. Hurwitz, Margaret Gurney, and Marvin Schneiderman—all of whom became distinguished statisticians.

== U.S. Census Bureau 1940–1973 ==
Waksberg mainly worked on sample design issues, but his thinking was not limited to mathematical considerations. Depending on the application, he adapted methods to account for practicalities. In the early 1960s he and John Neter studied memory recall errors in a consumer survey of home repair costs. Although response errors in expenditure surveys were a known problem, it had not often been studied directly. Neter and Waksberg conducted an experiment sponsored by the United States Census Bureau to study the tendency of people to misreport the time period when expenditures occurred. Large expenditures, in particular, were often reported to have occurred nearer to the present than when they actually occurred, i.e., they were telescoped forward. Based on their findings, they were the first to propose bounded recall as a potential solution. In the second or later interview in a continuing survey the respondent is told the expenditures that had been reported in the previous interview then asked for the additional expenditures since then. The telescoping effect was later recognized in cognitive psychology as a common memory problem in the recall of past effects. Waksberg and Neter are credited with doing the original work on the concept of telescoping. Their work is also relevant to conditioning effects in panel surveys where participants' reports of their characteristics may (incorrectly) change over time, leading to biases in estimates.

Faulty data used in designing a sample was another topic he studied. When he became the head statistician on the United States Current Population Survey (CPS) in the early 1960’s, the area probability methods were well established. But the survey had to face new problems caused by the expanding American economy. The migration to the suburbs from cities had begun and data from the 1960 census was becoming progressively staler. Maps being used for fieldwork were outdated. Fast-growing neighborhoods led to bad measures of size used for probability proportional to size sampling based on the last census, which, in turn, led to intolerably expensive workloads if the original sampling plan was implemented. Coverage errors were recognized problems for censuses and surveys on which he also led research. With his colleagues, Waksberg helped introduce address-list sampling as a way of reducing the number of households inadvertently omitted by field listers.

Waksberg and colleagues measured the total variance between the sample segments and the within-segments variance for a variety of items collected by the CPS to gauge the effect of interviewers. Two interviewers received randomly selected assignments within a set of small geographic areas. The results showed large interviewer effects for many items collected in the survey. This research led to much of the information being collected from a sample of persons rather than the full population in order to reduce the number of interviewers. In the 1960 US census, data collection was conducted by mail thereby eliminating the issue of undesirable variation among interviewers.

== Later years ==
After 33 years of service, Waksberg retired from the Census Bureau and joined Westat, a statistical research firm in Rockville, Maryland.

While at Westat he and Warren Mitofsky developed the Mitofsky-Waksberg (MW) method of random digit dialing (Waksberg, 1978). This article has been cited in various statistical and social science journals nearly 2,000 times. In 1986, Kalton and Anderson noted that the method was especially useful for sampling rare populations. The MW method has been particularly useful in identifying persons to use as controls from the general population in case-control studies.

In the early 1970s unrestricted random sampling of telephone numbers in the United States was extremely inefficient for household sampling. The MW method treated the first eight digits in the sorted list of phone numbers as clusters (known as 100-banks), screened clusters by phoning a randomly selected number in a sample 100-bank and retaining a cluster only if the contacted number was residential. In a retained cluster additional 2-digit numbers were appended to the 8-digit cluster number and phoned to obtain the desired sample size.

In 1967 he was asked by Mitofsky to consult for the CBS television network on election night predictions, a post he maintained through the 1994 elections. In 1966 CBS based its predictions on set of key precincts in every state. In most states, the system worked well but gave poor predictions in a few states like Maryland. The issue in Maryland was that precincts whose party vote-split changed substantially from the previous election were thrown out as being either outliers or errors. The reported vote in those precincts turned out to be correct, and their removal produced an incorrect prediction in the governor's race. Based on the recommendation of Waksberg and Mitofsky, CBS switched to probability samples of precincts with none being replaced.

== Honors ==
He served the profession of statistics in many roles and received numerous awards, including the Department of Commerce Gold Medal, the Roger Herriot Memorial Award from the American Statistical Association (ASA), and election as an ASA Fellow in 1964. He served on the ASA board of directors as chairs of both the Survey Research Methods Section and the Social Statistics Section and on a number of committees. He has been president of the Washington Statistical Society and was an Associate Editor of the journal Survey Methodology. Throughout his career at the Census Bureau and Westat, he had a commitment to mentoring young statisticians. In 2001 the journal Survey Methodology established the annual Waksberg Award in his honor to recognize his contributions to the survey profession.
