= Telescoping effect =

Temporal displacement of an event

In cognitive psychology, the telescoping effect (or telescoping bias) is a phenomenon in which people underestimate the recency of recent events (backward telescoping), and overestimate the recency of distant events (forward telescoping).

The approximate time at which events switch from backward to forward telescoping is three years, with events occurring three years in the past being equally likely to be reported with forward telescoping bias as with backward telescoping bias. Although telescoping occurs in both the forward and backward directions, in general the effect is to increase the number of events reported too recently. This net effect in the forward direction is because forces that impair memory, such as lack of salience, also impair time perception.

Telescoping leads to an over-reporting of the frequency of events. This over-reporting is because participants include events beyond the period, either events that are too recent for the target time period (backward telescoping) or events that are too old for the target time period (forward telescoping).

== Origin of the term ==
The original work on telescoping is usually attributed to a 1964 article by Neter and Joseph Waksberg in the Journal of the American Statistical Association. The term telescoping comes from the idea that time seems to shrink toward the present in the way that the distance to objects seems to shrink when they are viewed through a telescope.

== Real-world example ==
A real-world example of the telescoping effect is the case of Ferdi Elsas, an infamous kidnapper and murderer in the Netherlands. When he was let out of prison, most of the general population did not believe he had been in prison long enough. Due to forward telescoping, people thought Ferdi Elsas' sentence started more recently than it actually did. Telescoping has important real world applications, especially in survey research. Marketing firms often use surveys to ask when consumers last bought a product, and government agencies often use surveys to discover information about drug abuse or about victimology. Telescoping may bias answers to these questions.

== Methods for studying ==
Telescoping is studied in psychology by asking participants to recall dates or to estimate the recency of a personal event. Another procedure that is often used is called the diary procedure, in which participants record personal events in a diary each day for several months. After the diary is completed, participants are asked to date events and assess how well they remember those events. Their recollections are then compared to the actual dates and details of the events in order to determine if telescoping has occurred.

== Models and other explanations ==
Researchers have examined possible reasons that the telescoping effect occurs. They have proposed the following hypotheses and models. The two models that are currently favored are the associative and boundary models.

=== Accessibility hypothesis ===
Brown, Rips, and Shevell created the accessibility hypothesis. This hypothesis states that dates are estimated, not recalled, and these estimates are based on what is remembered about the event. People use how much detail they recall about an event to infer how long ago the event occurred. Therefore, memorable events should be recalled as occurring recently. Since these memorable events are recalled as occurring more recently, in general people overestimate the recency of events and forward telescoping occurs. For example, when people are asked to estimate the dates of the shooting of Ronald Reagan and Pope John Paul II, which occurred in the same year, they typically estimate that Ronald Reagan's shooting occurred more recently. Ronald Reagan's shooting is usually a more memorable event and was more heavily publicized, so the memory of this event was more accessible to participants, indicating that accessibility plays a role in the dating of events. However, these results are not always replicated, and sometimes the reverse is found. For this reason, other explanations have been presented to explain telescoping.

=== Conveyor belt model ===
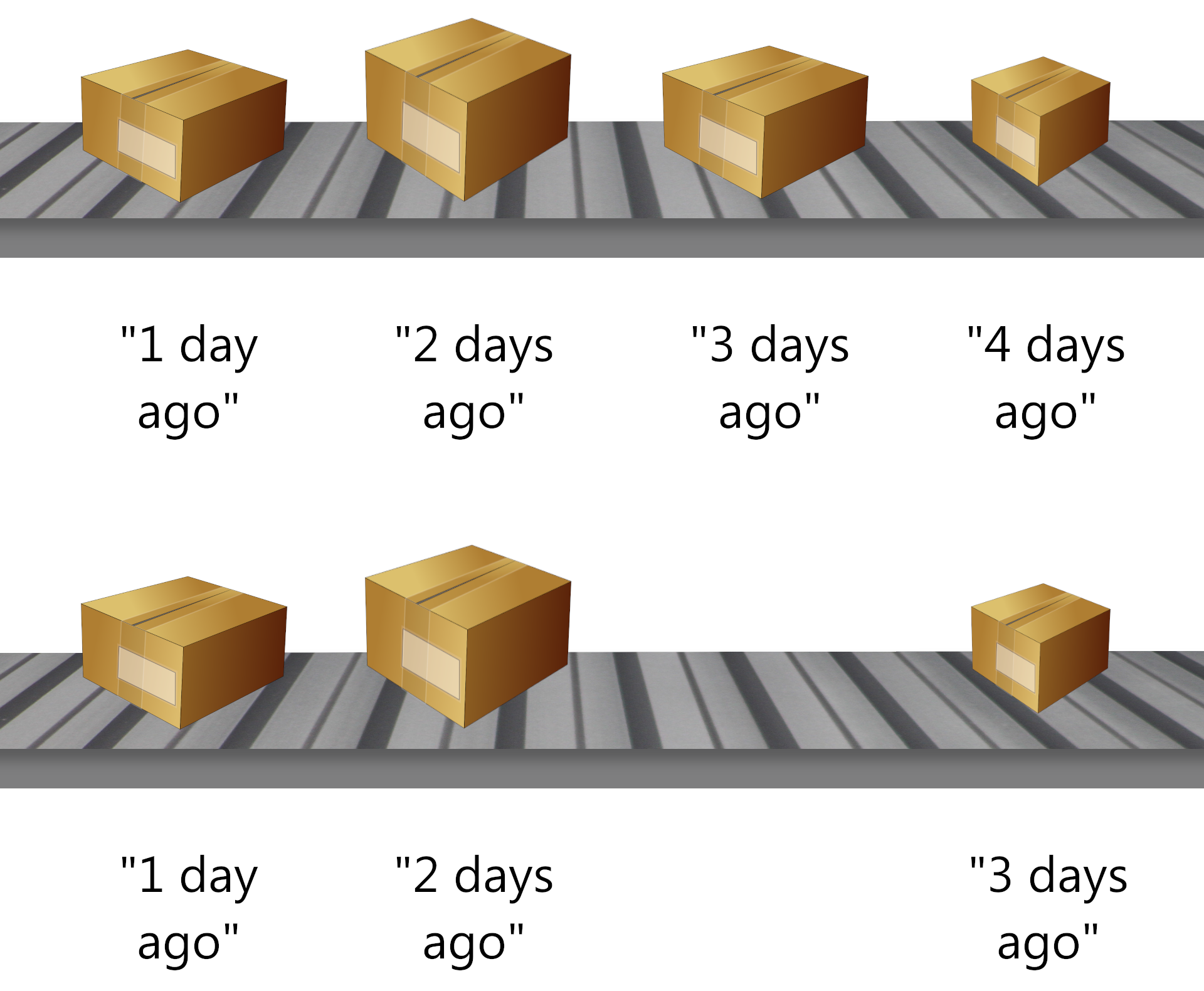
This image portrays the conveyor belt model of the telescoping effect, which assumes that when an event is forgotten, earlier events are recalled as occurring more recently.

Thompson et al. used the conveyor belt model of memory to explain forward telescoping. It assumes that events are stored in the order that they occur. When individuals try to remember the date of an event, they scan serially backward through memory. Since events are only remembered by order or time between events in this model, if an event is forgotten, previous events are recalled as if they occurred more recently and forward telescoping occurs. Another way of interpreting this theory is that people estimate the dates of events based on the number of personal events that have occurred since the target event. Since people underestimate memory loss over long periods of time, target events are moved closer to the present. Although this model explains forward telescoping, it does not explain backward telescoping.

=== Guessing ===
Some psychologists have suggested that telescoping occurs because people are guessing the date of an event. According to this theory, if a person is unsure of a date, they minimize their chance of erring by placing events toward the middle of the period. However, telescoping occurs at the same frequency if events are remembered well or if events are not remembered well. Therefore, guessing is not a complete explanation for telescoping, and another one of these models is likely responsible.

=== Boundary model ===
Rubin and Baddley created the boundary model to explain telescoping. When people date events, they often get information from a bounded period, such as a year or a vacation. This model assumes events are not assigned outside of the boundaries of this period, so dating errors can only move toward the middle of a boundary and that since recent events are dated more accurately, forward telescoping has a stronger effect. It postulates that, without boundaries, an estimation would be unbiased.

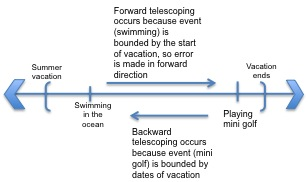
This image explains the boundary model of the telescoping effect. The boundary model states that telescoping is the result of dating errors moving toward the middle of a bounded period.

There is some evidence against the boundary model. A study by Lee and Brown in 2004 looked at how four different groups dated news events under different conditions. They found that the different boundaries had no effect on date estimation, and the existence of a boundary had no effect on date estimation. This study suggests that telescoping is not due solely to boundaries.

=== Associative model ===
Simon Kemp proposed the associative model to explain telescoping without using boundaries. Kemp argued that people use an association strategy that links target events to other events for which dating information is available. According to Kemp, this association leads to a regression to the mean of known dates. This approach assumes that the date of an event is determined by using memories from other similar events, that ability to recall relevant information decreases overtime, and that the associated event is more likely to be more recent than the actual event because the ability to retrieve information decreases overtime.

A variation of this theory is the prototype model. This model states that prototypes can aid the process of dating events. A prototype event is a general event. For example, a specific event could be the assassination of John F. Kennedy and a prototype event could be the assassination of a world leader. People can use associated prototype events to help them recall events in the same way they use normal events.

Although the prototype model is based on general events and the associative model is based on actual events, both have been supported in experiments. Participants are worse at estimating the dates of events if they have to date events spontaneously, without using context or associated events, and prototype event estimates resemble spontaneously estimated events. The associative model does not predict what occurs if a person has never heard of an event and cannot predict what sort of biasing will occur for these responses. Therefore, the associative model, like the boundary effect model, cannot explain all aspects of telescoping but can explain new aspects of telescoping.

=== Other explanations ===
Heuristics

Some psychologists suggest telescoping errors are due to the heuristics used to answer dating and frequency questions. When asked questions about frequency, people often answer using phrases like "all the time" and "everyday" and therefore don't account for exceptions. Depending on the events in question, this could lead to an over or under estimation of the occurrence of an event, and be perceived as telescoping. This over-reporting is a result of telescoping because telescoping causes participants to include events beyond the period. Therefore, heuristics may be responsible for some of the telescoping errors.

Demand characteristics

Other psychologists believe that the telescoping errors that have been reported in studies are not due to a phenomenon of memory, but demand characteristics. Responses to questions about the frequency of behavior can be biased because of demand characteristics. Respondents may provide too much information, rather than too little, because they are trying to provide as much useful information as possible, and therefore over-report the frequency of events. Some researchers perceive this over reporting as telescoping because people are including events beyond the given period, but the over reporting could be due to the demand characteristics of the study. Demand characteristics can explain the appearance of forward telescoping, but cannot explain backwards telescoping and can not explain the inaccurate recall of dates when respondents are not led to believe that a certain answer is desirable.

== Modifiers of effect ==
=== Development ===
Psychologists have studied the telescoping effect in children because a person's development can have a significant impact on his or her memory. Telescoping occurs at all ages, but to different degrees. Older children have a greater tendency to telescope earlier memories and a weaker tendency to telescope recent memories than younger children. Children's telescoping errors occur for their earliest memories. This finding is significant because it probably occurs for adults as well, and therefore people's earliest memories are reported as more recent than they actually are. This finding indicates that the earliest memories reported in childhood amnesia literature should be questioned because they may have occurred earlier than they are reported.

Many older adults claim time speeds up as they get older, which can be explained by forward telescoping. Since forward telescoping leads people to underestimate the amount of time that has occurred since an event, people may feel as if time has passed quickly when they discover the true amount of time since that event. This explanation is one reason for why people perceive time as moving faster as they age, but it does not take into account changes in the amount of telescoping that occurs with age. People are best at accurately identifying dates when they are ages 35–50. Participants age 60 and older show a decrease in the degree of forward telescoping and tend to date events too remotely instead of too recently. The sensation of time speeding up may be derived from the fact that time is subjectively longer and therefore people assume that the time must be going by more quickly.

=== Minimizing the effect ===
The way a question is phrased is an important factor in minimizing the telescoping effect. If a question clearly defines the time period of interest, telescoping errors will be reduced. Also, if a question is more specific or difficult, it requires more reconstructive processes; therefore, the answers to these questions will include less telescoping.

Neter and Waksberg also developed a procedure called bounded recall to help decrease the effect of telescoping. In preliminary interviews, participants are asked about events, and then, in later interviews, participants are reminded of these events and then asked about additional occurrences. One limitation of this process is that it requires information from preliminary interviews be correct.

A person's temporal framework is also related to the amount of telescoping errors that they make. As a person's temporal framework becomes more elaborate, they have more reference points from which to date events and commit fewer telescoping errors.

== Implications ==
=== Substance use ===
The telescoping effect is pertinent for behaviors such as smoking and alcohol usage, especially when they are early onset behaviors. Studies of the telescoping effect have examined the reported age of onset of smoking, alcohol, and drug use. Forward telescoping has been found in reported age of initial use of cigarettes and in reported age of beginning daily smoking. Therefore, people may be misclassified as having late onset of drug use, when in reality, they had early onset. Forward telescoping of risky behaviors can be problematic in monitoring patients for issues associated with early onset drug use because if they are misclassified, they may not be correctly monitored. The same effect of forward telescoping is found for marijuana, alcohol, and hard drug usage. The implications of forward telescoping on these behaviors are similar to those of smoking.

In the United States, in the 1950s, a telescoping effect was observed with women entering alcohol abuse treatment programs with shorter histories than their male counterparts, but with symptoms of equivalent severity. The forward telescoping of alcohol histories is still prevalent today and has since been observed in opiate abuse and pathological gambling. Several theories have been suggested to explain the effect, though the exact mechanism remains unclear.

=== Marketing ===
Marketing firms often use survey data to estimate when consumers will next buy a product. Telescoping errors may bias these estimates and cause faulty marketing campaigns. Respondents on marketing research surveys are often inaccurate when recalling the time period of their last purchase, and forward telescoping is common. Backward telescoping is also common and leads to respondents overstating their intention to buy a replacement product as they underestimate the likelihood of their product breaking down. Telescoping has a significant effect on market research and therefore should be taken into account in marketing strategies.

== See also ==
- List of memory biases
