= Diana Mutz =

American political scientist

- Born: 1962 (age 63–64)
- Citizenship: American
- Education: Northwestern University (B.S., 1984); Stanford University (A.M., 1985; Ph.D., 1988)
- Known for: Political communication
- Awards: Lifetime Career Achievement Award in Political Communication from the American Political Science Association (2011)
- Scientific career
- Fields: Political science Communication studies
- Workplaces: University of Pennsylvania
- Thesis: Yours, mine and ours: Information sources, perceptions of unemployment and their political consequences (1988)

Diana Carole Mutz (born 1962) is the Samuel A. Stouffer Professor of Political Science and Communication at the University of Pennsylvania, where she is also the director of the Institute for the Study of Citizens and Politics. She is known for her research in the field of political communication. She formerly served as editor-in-chief of the peer-reviewed journal Political Behavior.

In 2007, Mutz received the Goldsmith Book Prize from Harvard University for her 2006 book Hearing the Other Side: Deliberative Versus Participatory Democracy. She was named a fellow of the American Academy of Arts and Sciences in 2008, and was awarded a Guggenheim Fellowship in 2016.

In 2021, she was elected member of the U. S. National Academy of Sciences.

== Research ==
According to a study published in the Proceedings of the National Academy of Sciences (PNAS), Mutz explained that "evidence of voters politicizing personal economic hardship has been exceedingly rare," over many decades of studying the issue. She argued that contrary to the commonly held belief that economic hardship drive many people to vote for Donald Trump in 2016, Trump won the election because of the fear that "traditionally high-status Americans" such as whites, Christians and men, feel threatened that they will lose their privileged status to minorities if they are given a chance to succeed in American society.
