= Robert Y. Shapiro =

American political scientist

- Awards: Goldsmith Book Prize (2001)

Academic background
- Education: Massachusetts Institute of Technology (BS); University of Chicago (PhD)

Academic work
- Discipline: Political science
- Institutions: Columbia University

Robert Y. Shapiro is an American political scientist specializing in public opinion polling and statistical methods. He is the Wallace S. Sayre professor of government at Columbia University. He is the chair of the Roper Center for Public Opinion Research at Cornell University, president of the Academy of Political Science, editor of the Political Science Quarterly, and a former acting director of the Institute for Social and Economic Research and Policy at Columbia.

== Biography ==
Shapiro received his S.B. from the Massachusetts Institute of Technology, M.A. in political science, M.A. in policy studies, and Ph.D. in political science, all from the University of Chicago.

After receiving his doctorate, he worked at the NORC at the University of Chicago for several years before joining Columbia's faculty in 1982. From 2000 to 2003, he served as the chair of Columbia University's department of political science.

In 2005, Shapiro joined the Council on Foreign Relations as a visiting fellow to study American attitudes toward foreign policy and the social and political attitudes of soldiers and officers in the U.S. Army. He also served as the acting director of the Institute for Social and Economic Research and Policy at Columbia from 2008 to 2009.

In 2009, he was elected a fellow of the American Association for the Advancement of Science.

Shapiro became the editor-in-chief of Political Science Quarterly in 2020, and has served on the editorial boards of Public Opinion Quarterly and Presidential Studies Quarterly.

Shapiro is the co-recipient of the 2001 Goldsmith Book Prize for his book Politicians Don't Pander: Political Manipulation and the Loss of Democratic Responsiveness.
