= Jill Dever =

American statistician

Jill A. Dever is an American statistician specializing in survey methodology who works as a senior researcher and senior director in the division for statistical & data sciences at RTI International.

== Education ==
Dever is a graduate of the University of Louisville. Majoring in mathematics there, she was encouraged by a faculty member, Steven Seif, to continue in statistics. She earned a master's degree in biostatistics from the University of North Carolina at Chapel Hill, and completed her Ph.D. in survey methodology at the University of Maryland, College Park. Her 2008 dissertation, Sampling Weight Calibration with Estimated Control Totals, was supervised by Richard Valliant.

== Book ==
With Richard Valliant and Frauke Kreuter, Dever is a co-author of the book Practical Tools for Designing and Weighting Survey Samples (Springer, Statistics for Social and Behavioral Sciences, 2013; 2nd ed., 2018).

== Recognition ==
In 2015 Dever was elected as a Fellow of the American Statistical Association.
