= Deborah Cohen =

American historian and author

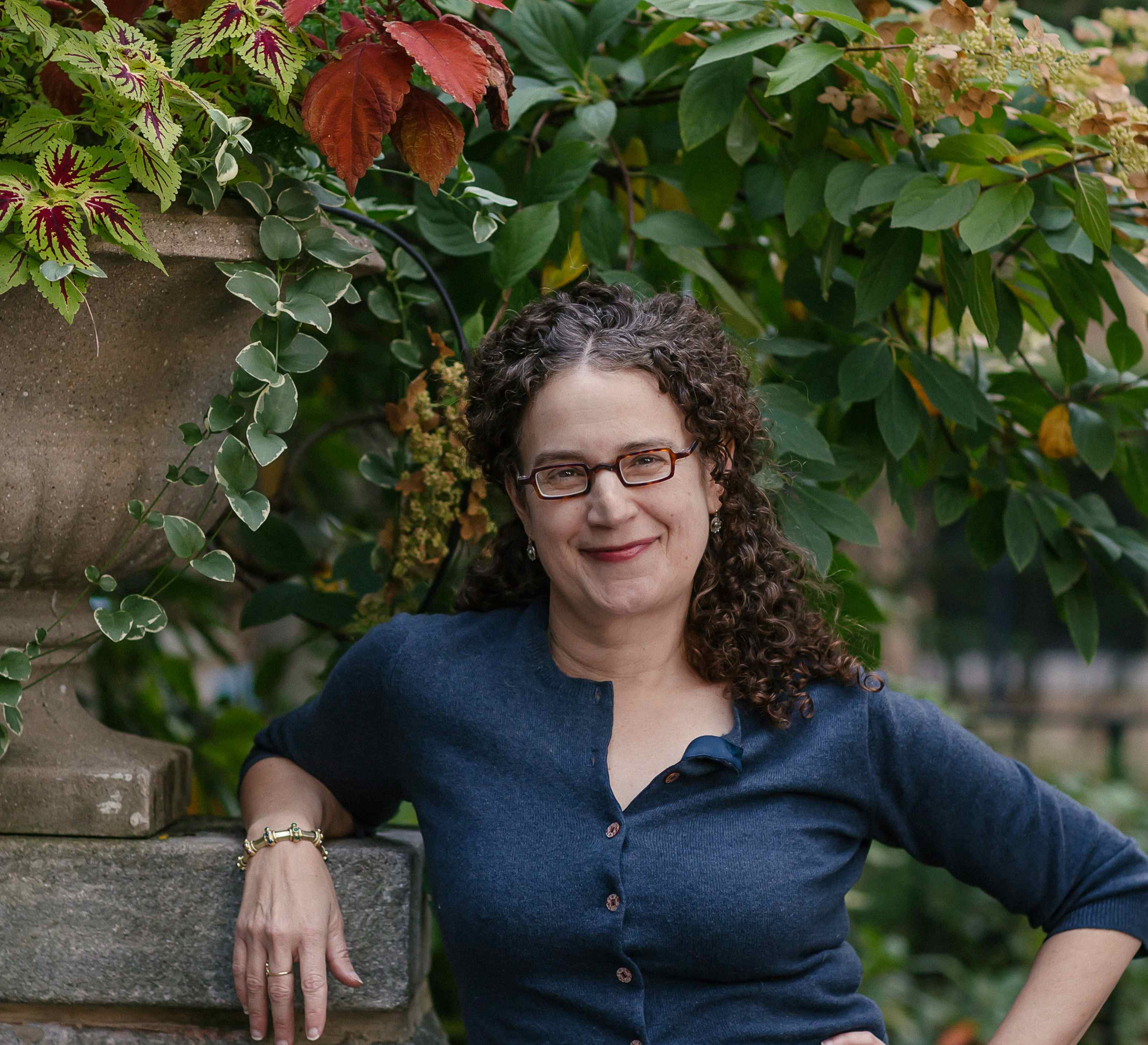
Deborah Cohen

Deborah Anne Cohen (born 1968) is an American historian of modern Europe and Britain. She is the Richard W. Leopold Professor of History at Northwestern University and Director of Northwestern's Roberta Buffett Institute for Global Affairs. (Note: Not to be confused with Deborah Cohen, historian of the US and Mexico at the University of Missouri–St. Louis)

== Education and career ==
Cohen is of Polish, Ukrainian, and Russian Jewish descent and grew up the daughter of a lawyer in Louisville, Kentucky. Her interest in British history stems from her father's interest in British modernist literature, and her feminist approach to history was influenced by Harvard University professors Susan Pedersen, Alexandra Owen, and Olwen Hufton. She graduated summa cum laude from Radcliffe College in 1990, and completed her Ph.D. in history at the University of California, Berkeley in 1996. After working as a faculty member in the history departments of American University from 1997 to 2002 and Brown University from 2002 to 2010, she joined Northwestern University as Ritzma Professor in 2010.

She is a member of the Editorial Board for Past & Present.

== Books ==
Cohen's first book was The War Come Home: Disabled Veterans in Britain and Germany, 1914–1939 (University of California Press, 2001). In it, she contrasted the generous treatment by the Weimar Republic of veterans returning from World War I, and the lingering resentment of those veterans toward the Republic, with the more meager support by Britain for its veterans and their loyalty to their state. Rather than attributing these differences to the different outcomes of the war for the two countries, she credits Britain's encouragement of private philanthropy towards veterans for their happiness.

Her second book, Household Gods: The British and their Possessions (Yale University Press, 2006), studies the rise of the middle class in Britain from the Victorian era to the present, through the mirror of their household possessions. Her themes include the descent of popular tastes from the individuality of the Victorians into mass conformity, and (triggered by the 1895 libel and indecency trials of Oscar Wilde) a perceived linkage between aesthetic taste and homosexuality that led British men to retreat from home decor, leaving it to women.

Family Secrets: Shame and Privacy in Modern Britain (Viking Penguin and Oxford University Press, 2013), her third book, concerns British families and the ways they handled issues that might be considered shameful, including birth defects, mixed-race and illegitimate children, adoption, divorce, homosexuality, and abusive family members. As with Household Gods she mainly focuses on the middle class. Cohen studies the way that the balance between privacy and secrecy has been transformed by developments including the enforced openness of mid-19th-century divorce courts, the early 20th-century legalization of adoption and abortion, and the changing sizes and composition of family units.

Last Call at the Hotel Imperial: The Reporters Who Took On a World at War (2022, Random House, ISBN 978-0525511199) is the story of John Gunther, H. R. Knickerbocker, Vincent Sheean, and Dorothy Thompson, pioneering American reporters of 1930s Europe. The book won several awards:

- Mark Lynton History Prize (2023)
- Goldsmith Book Prize for Trade (2023)

== Recognition ==
Cohen's book The War Come Home won the Allan Sharlin Memorial Book Award of the Social Science History Association. Her book Household Gods won the Morris D. Forkosch Prize of the American Historical Association, was co-winner of the Albion Book Prize of the North American Conference on British Studies, and was shortlisted for the Hessell-Tiltman Prize of the English PEN. Her book Family Secrets also won the Forkosch Prize, and was the winner of the Stansky Prize of the North American Conference on British Studies.

Cohen was elected as a Fellow of the American Academy of Arts and Sciences in 2018.
