= James R. Beniger =

American historian and sociologist (1946–2010)

James Ralph Beniger (December 16, 1946 – April 12, 2010) was an American historian and sociologist and Professor of Communications and Sociology at the Annenberg School for Communication at the University of Southern California, particularly known for his early work on the history of quantitative graphics in statistics, and his later work on the technological and economic origins of the information society.

== Biography ==
Beniger was born in Sheboygan, Wisconsin, and received his BA in history from Harvard University in 1969, his MA in statistics and sociology from the University of California, Berkeley, where in 1978 he received his PhD in sociology.

Beniger started his career in the early 1970s as staff writer for the Wall Street Journal, taught history, English, creative writing, and sociology on colleges and universities and travelled all around the world visiting over 40 countries. In the 1980s he was appointed Professor of Communications and Sociology at the Annenberg School for Communication at the University of Southern California. In 1996, Beniger was elected as the 53rd president of the American Association for Public Opinion Research. Beniger died of Alzheimer's disease in 2010 in Torrance, California at the age of 63.

== Work ==
=== Quantitative graphics in statistics, 1981 ===
In the 1978 paper "Quantitative graphics in statistics: A brief history," Beniger & Robyn argued, that "quantitative graphics have been central to the development of science, and statistical graphics date from the earliest attempts to analyze data. Many familiar forms, including bivariate plots, statistical maps, bar charts, and coordinate paper, were used in the 18th century."

In the development of statistical graphics over the centuries, according to Beniger & Robyn, innovators had to tackle four problems:

- spatial organization, in the 17th and 18th centuries,
- discrete comparison, in the 18th and early 19th centuries,
- continuous distribution, in the 19th century, and
- multivariate distribution and correlation, in the late 19th and early 20th centuries.

Beniger & Robyn conclude, that in their days "statistical graphics appear to be reemerging as an important analytic tool, with recent innovations exploiting computer graphics and related technologies." This was confirmed by W. H. Kruskall (1975), who specified:

The role of statistical graphics within statistics generally... has had tremendous ups and downs: at one time, graphical methods were near the core of statistics-Karl Pearson devoted considerable attention to graphics and he was following the emphasis of his hero, Francis Galton. Later on, statistical graphics became neglected and even scorned in comparison with the blossoming of the mathematical side of statistics. In recent years, however, there has been a renaissance of concern with graphics and some of our best statistical minds have suggested new graphical approaches of great interest.

=== Developments in Statistical Graphics ===
The 1978 paper by Beniger & Robyn is complemented with an appendix on the developments in Statistical Graphics which starts with:

c. 3800 B.C. Oldest known map (of Northern Mesopotamia) extant on clay tablet

And ends with:

1977 "Cartesian rectangle" to represent 2 x 2 table, experimentally tested against other forms Wainer and Mark Reiser, U.S. [87];

Ad Hoc Committee on Statistical Graphics, American Statistical Association.

This timeline is further developed into Michael Friendly's "Milestones in the history of thematic cartography, statistical graphics, and data visualization" (2008).

== Selected publications ==
- James R. Beniger. Interorganizational Response to Social Change: Professional Control of Drug Abuse by Youth in 2 Cities, 1972 - 1973. University Microfilms, 1980
- James Beniger. The Control Revolution: Technological and Economic Origins of the Information Society, Harvard University Press, 1989/2009

Articles, a selection:

- Beniger, James R., and Dorothy L. Robyn. "Quantitative graphics in statistics: A brief history." The American Statistician 32.1 (1978): 1–11.
- Darley, John M., and James R. Beniger. "Diffusion of Energy‐Conserving Innovations." Journal of Social Issues 37.2 (1981): 150–171.
- Beniger, James R. "Personalization of mass media and the growth of pseudo-community." Communication research (1987).
- Beniger, James R. "Toward and old new paradigm: The half-century flirtation with mass society." Public Opinion Quarterly (1987): S46-S66.
- Beniger, James R. "Communication—Embrace the subject, not the field." Journal of Communication 43.3 (1993): 18–25.
