= The Control Revolution =

1986 book by James Beniger

- Cover of the first edition (paperback)
- Author: James R. Beniger
- Original title: The Control Revolution: Technological and Economic Origins of the Information Society
- Language: English
- Genre: Non-fiction
- Publisher: Harvard University Press
- Publication date: 1986
- Publication place: United States
- Media type: Print (Paperback)
- Pages: 508 pp
- ISBN: 9780674169869

The Control Revolution is a book by James Beniger that explains the origins of the information society in part from the need to manage and control the production of an industrial society. The book received the Association of American Publishers Award for the Most Outstanding Book in the Social and Behavioral Sciences and the Phi Kappa Phi Faculty Recognition Award. Beniger was a professor at the University of Southern California.
