= Archibald Crossley =

American pollster (1896-1985)

- Born: December 7, 1896; Fieldsboro, New Jersey, US
- Died: May 1, 1985 (aged 88); Princeton, New Jersey, US
- Education: Princeton University
- Occupation: Pollster
- Known for: Public opinion research

Archibald Maddock Crossley (December 7, 1896 – May 1, 1985) was an American pollster, statistician, and pioneer in public opinion research. Along with friends-cum-rivals Elmo Roper and George Gallup, Crossley has been described as one of the fathers of election polling.

== Biography ==
Crossley was born in Fieldsboro, New Jersey, on December 7, 1896. He attended Princeton University for one year in 1917, dropping out to go to work as a copywriter and researcher for J. H. Cross Company, a small advertising firm in Philadelphia. He returned to Princeton and received his bachelor's degree in psychology in 1950.

Crossley was research director for The Literary Digest from 1922 to 1926, when he launched his own market research company. In 1929, he developed the Crossley ratings (a term he coined) to gauge the audience size of radio broadcasts. Like Elmo Roper and George Gallup, Crossley successfully predicted the outcome of the 1936 United States presidential election. The pollsters used scientific sampling methodologies that proved far more accurate than the Literary Digest's straw poll, which had notoriously predicted Franklin D. Roosevelt's defeat (he won in a landslide).

Crossley was instrumental in the establishment of the Market Research Council, the National Council on Public Polls, and the American Association for Public Opinion Research, which he served as president from 1952 to 1953. He joined the editorial board of Public Opinion Quarterly in 1944. After Crossley, Roper, and Gallup all wrongly predicted the outcome of the 1948 U.S. presidential election, they developed industry standards for public opinion polls, inaugurating an industry-wide shift from quota sampling to probability sampling.

Crossley was the first pollster to study the psychology of questionnaires, such as how phraseology influenced responses. He also crusaded for a stronger code of professional ethics among pollsters, publicly rebuking the Democratic National Committee in 1967 for leaking a private Crossley poll to the press in an attempt to bolster Lyndon B. Johnson's sinking popularity.

== Personal life ==
Crossley was married to Dorothy Fox Crossley, who died in 1983. Their daughter, Helen Martha Crossley (1921–2016), worked for the United States Information Agency for decades and founded the Crossley Center for Public Opinion Research at the University of Denver in 2012. Archibald Crossley died at his home in Princeton, New Jersey, on May 1, 1985.
