= Journal of Survey Statistics and Methodology =

- Discipline: Survey methodology, statistics
- Language: English
- Edited by: Emily Berg, Brad Edwards

Publication details
- History: 2013–present
- Publisher: Oxford University Press for the American Association for Public Opinion Research and American Statistical Association
- Frequency: 5/year
- Open access: Hybrid
- Impact factor: 2.1 (2022)

Standard abbreviations
- ISO 4: J. Surv. Stat. Methodol.

Indexing
- ISSN: 2325-0984 (print); 2325-0992 (web)
- OCLC no.: 1368586607

Links
- Journal homepage; Online archive

The Journal of Survey Statistics and Methodology is a peer-reviewed academic journal that covers statistical and methodological issues for sample surveys, censuses, administrative record systems, and other related data. The journal was established in 2013 and the co-editors-in-chief are Emily Berg (Iowa State University) and Brad Edwards (Westat) since July 2024. The journal is published by Oxford University Press on behalf of the American Association for Public Opinion Research and American Statistical Association.

== Abstracting and indexing ==
The journal is abstracted and indexed in:

- Current Contents/Social and Behavioral Sciences
- Science Citation Index Expanded
- Scopus
- Social Sciences Citation Index

According to the Journal Citation Reports, the journal has a 2022 impact factor of 2.1.
