= Burton Berinsky =

American writer, photographer, and designer

Burton Berinsky (April 5, 1931 – September 29, 1991) was an American writer, photographer, and designer.

== Biography ==
Born in Boston, Massachusetts, Berinsky was a graduate of the Boston Latin School ('48), Brandeis University ('52), and the International Ladies' Garment Workers' Union Training Institute. From June 1955 to March 1959, he worked as a representative of the Underwear Workers' Union Local 85 in Long Beach, New Jersey, and after 1959 as representative of Local 150–157 of South River, New Jersey. While working with the ILGWU, he participated in the Matawan Undergarment work stoppage in 1956 and the Dress Joint Board General Strike in 1958.

After his time as a representative, Berinsky became the ILGWU's photographer. After leaving the ILGWU, Berinsky worked as a freelance photographer, hat designer, and journalist. Berinsky died in New York City.
