= Howard Schuman =

American sociologist and professor of sociology (1928–2021)

- Born: March 16, 1928; Cincinnati, Ohio, U.S.
- Died: April 18, 2021 (aged 93); Maine, U.S.
- Education: Antioch College; Trinity University; Harvard University
- Known for: Survey research
- Awards: Guggenheim Fellowship (1980–1981); American Association for Public Opinion Research's Award for Exceptionally Distinguished Achievement (1994); Paul F. Lazarsfeld Award from the Methodology Section of the American Sociological Association (1996); Warren J. Mitofsky Award for Excellence in Public Opinion Research from the Roper Center for Public Opinion Research (2017)
- Scientific career
- Fields: Sociology
- Workplaces: University of Michigan
- Thesis: Social structure and personality constriction in a total institution (1961)

Howard Schuman (March 16, 1928 – April 18, 2021) was an American sociologist and professor of sociology at the University of Michigan. He is known for his work on survey research, such as the design of polling questions.

== Biography ==
Howard Schuman was born in Cincinnati, Ohio on March 16, 1928. He received his A.B. from Antioch College in philosophy in 1953, his M.S. in psychology from Trinity University in 1956, and his Ph.D. in sociology from Harvard University in 1961. He joined the faculty of the University of Michigan in 1964 as an assistant professor, and became a full professor there in 1971. From 1982 to 1990, he directed the Survey Research Center at the University of Michigan's Institute for Social Research. He retired from his positions at the University of Michigan in 1996; he has been an emeritus professor at the University of Michigan and an emeritus research scientist at their Survey Research Center until 2021. In 2017, Schuman received the Warren J. Mitofsky Award for Excellence in Public Opinion Research from the board of directors of the Roper Center for Public Opinion Research at Cornell University. Schuman died in Maine on April 18, 2021, at the age of 93.

== Research ==
Schuman researched many topics in the field of survey research, including public opinion on whether Christopher Columbus discovered America, reported incidents of police abuse in major U.S. cities, and the relationship between studying and grades.

== Professional affiliations ==
Schuman was a fellow of the Society of Personality and Social Psychology from 1991, of the Association for Psychological Science from 2004, and of the American Academy of Arts and Sciences from 1993.
