= Michael Traugott =

American political scientist, communication studies researcher and political pundit

Michael W. Traugott
- Education: University of Michigan; Princeton University
- Scientific career
- Fields: Political science, communication studies
- Workplaces: University of Michigan

Michael Wolfe Traugott is an American political scientist, communication studies researcher, and political pundit. As of 2022, he is a Professor Emeritus at the University of Michigan, Ann Arbor and adjunct research professor at UM's Institute for Social Research, Center for Political Studies.

Traugott finished his undergraduate education at Princeton University and completed a Master's degree and PhD at the University of Michigan. He has authored, co-authored, or edited at least 14 books and more than 100 journal articles and book chapters. His research focuses on voting technology (sponsored by a National Science Foundation grant), elections, political campaigns, opinion polling, and the political role of the mass media in the United States.

In addition to consulting work with various media organizations, including the Voter News Service, Traugott has served as president of the American Association for Public Opinion Research (AAPOR) and the World Association for Public Opinion Research (WAPOR). In addition, he has received the 2010 AAPOR Award for distinguished lifetime achievement as well as WAPOR's Helen Dinerman Award for career contributions to public opinion research in 2018.

Traugott sponsored the April 20, 2001 "Election Administration in the United States" seminar, held after the 2000 presidential election, to examine the impact of localized voting problems on national elections.

In January 2013, Gallup announced that Traugott would assist in its comprehensive review of its polling methods following the poor performance during the 2012 presidential campaign.

Traugott served as the Director of the ICPSR Summer Program from 2020 to 2022.

== Selected works ==
- ——, with Paul J. Lavrakas and Peter V. Miller (1995). Presidential Polls and the News Media. Boulder, Colorado: Westview Press. ISBN 978-0-8133-8943-1.
- ——, with Paul J. Lavrakas (2004). The Voter's Guide to Election Polls, 5th edition. Lanham, Maryland: Rowman & Littlefield. ISBN 978-0-7425-3612-8.
