= Overblown (book) =

2006 book by John E. Mueller

Overblown: How Politicians and the Terrorism Industry Inflate National Security Threats, and Why We Believe Them
- Author: John E. Mueller
- Language: English
- Publisher: Free Press
- Publication date: 2006
- Publication place: United States

Overblown: How Politicians and the Terrorism Industry Inflate National Security Threats, and Why We Believe Them is a book by the American political scientist John E. Mueller published in 2006. It argues that the threat presented by terrorism, like many other security threats, has been much inflated.

== The book and the argument ==
=== Origins ===
Mueller, an expert on war and terrorism, had been expressing critical views of the terrorism industry for some time before publishing this book. The central arguments of the book were rehearsed for the first time in a 2005 article in one of the leading academic journals devoted to the study of terrorism, Terrorism and Political Violence, "Six Rather Unusual Propositions about Terrorism."

=== Argument ===
Mueller's central argument is that an American is more likely to die of drowning in the bath than in a terrorist attack, and that the rational response to terrorism is to keep the threat in realistic context, and otherwise getting on with life. That this does not happen has something to do with the terrorism industry--experts, journalists and politicians—and something to do with the human inability to assess risk and chance accurately.

Mueller goes in his book to extend his central argument to other varieties of national security threat.

== Bibliography ==
- John Mueller, Overblown: How Politicians and the Terrorism Industry Inflate National Security Threats, and Why We Believe Them (New York: Free Press, 2006).
- John Mueller, "Six Rather Unusual Propositions about Terrorism," Terrorism and Political Violence 17 (Autumn 2005), pp. 487‑505.
