= Eleanor Singer =

Austrian-born American mathematician

Eleanor Singer (March 4, 1930 – June 3, 2017) was an Austrian-born American expert on survey methodology. She edited Public Opinion Quarterly from 1975 to 1986, and with several co-authors wrote the textbook Survey Methodology. From 1987 to 1989 she was president of the American Association for Public Opinion Research.

== Education and career ==
Singer was born in Vienna. In 1938, a relative in New York helped her family escape the Nazis by moving to the US, and she grew up in Astoria, Queens. She did her undergraduate studies at Queens College, City University of New York, completing a bachelor's degree in English in 1951 as the top student in her class. It was at this time that she met her husband, Alan Singer.

Singer became an editor of books, for various publishers, and started focusing in books on social science. She entered graduate study at Columbia University in 1959, studying sociology there, and completed her Ph.D. in 1966, with a dissertation on Birth Order, Educational Aspirations, and Educational Attainment supervised by Herbert H. Hyman.

For approximately the next 30 years, Singer continued to work at Columbia as a researcher. She joined the Survey Research Center at the University of Michigan Institute for Social Research in 1994. She retired in 2006, but remained active as a researcher until close to her death.

== Contributions ==
Some of Singer's early research surveyed patient satisfaction with drug treatments. When the National Research Act of 1974 created strict new requirements for human subjects research, Singer conducted a survey of experimental subjects' experiences that made her "the preeminent survey expert on confidentiality and informed consent". In the 1980s, her research concerned the ways that the media reported on social science research and on risk. After she moved to Michigan, she shifted focus again, primarily concentrating on survey methodology.

== Awards and honors ==
In 1996, Singer won the lifetime achievement award of the American Association for Public Opinion Research. She was elected as a Fellow of the American Statistical Association in 2008, and in 2016 she won the Monroe G. Sirken Award in Interdisciplinary Survey Methods Research for "significant contributions in our understanding of survey participation, sources of nonresponse bias, and factors affecting survey responses; for pioneering research on the use and effects of incentives; and for leadership in developing awareness and understanding of ethical issues in survey research."
