= Elmo Roper =

American public opinion analyst

- Born: July 31, 1900; Hebron, Nebraska, US
- Died: April 30, 1971 (aged 70); West Redding, Connecticut, US
- Occupation: Public opinion analyst
- Years active: 1933–1966

Elmo Burns Roper Jr. (July 31, 1900 in Hebron, Nebraska – April 30, 1971 in Redding, Connecticut) was an American pollster known for his pioneering work in market research and opinion polling, alongside friends-cum-rivals Archibald Crossley and George Gallup.

== Early life ==
Elmo Burns Roper, Jr. was born in Hebron, Nebraska, on July 31, 1900. His father, Elmo Burns Roper, was a banker. After receiving his preliminary education, he attended the University of Minnesota and the University of Edinburgh from 1919 to 1921, but did not receive a degree. In 1921, he started a jewelry store, which made him interested in customer opinions. However, the store was closed in 1928. In the following years, he worked as a salesman for the Seth Thomas Clock Company and the New Haven Clock Company. In 1933, during the Great Depression, Roper became a sales analyst for the Traub Manufacturing Company.

== Career ==
In 1933, Roper, alongside Richardson Wood and Paul T. Cherington, co-founded "Cherington, Wood, and Roper", a marketing research firm. Woods suggested Henry Luce, the director of Fortune magazine, to include survey of social and political trend in the magazine; Luce agreed. Subsequently in 1935, Roper became the director of the Fortune survey. Unlike other popular surveys, his survey relied on relatively fewer respondents. This initially lead to many questioning poll's accuracy. The Fortune survey was the first national poll to use scientific sampling strategies.

In the 1936 presidential election, incumbent Democratic President Franklin D. Roosevelt was challenged by Alf Landon, the Republican candidate.The Literary Digest's presidential poll, which surveyed millions of people, predicted Landon to win. However, Roper, and other pollsters like George Gallup and Archibald Crossley predicted Roosevelt's re-election. Roper predicted Roosevelt to receive 61.7% of the popular vote. His prediction was correct to within 0.9%; Roosevelt received 60.7% of the popular vote. In the 1940 presidential election, Roper again predicted Roosevelt's victory against Wendell Willkie. His prediction was correct to within 0.5%. In the 1944 presidential election, he again accurately predicted Roosevelt to win a fourth term against Thomas E. Dewey.

In the 1948 presidential election, however, Roper predicted Dewey to defeat the incumbent Democratic President Harry S. Truman. He announced that his organization would discontinue polling since it had already predicted Dewey's victory by a large majority of electoral votes. He said that his whole inclination was to predict Dewey's victory by a heavy margin, and to devote his time and efforts in other things. His latest poll showed Dewey leading by an "unbeatable" 44% to Truman's 31%.

When that partnership fell apart, he founded his own research company, Elmo Roper, Inc.

In 1940, Roosevelt hired Roper to assess public opinion of Lend-Lease prior to its implementation.

In 1942 he was hired by William Joseph Donovan to be the deputy director of the Office of Strategic Services; Roper subsequently worked with the Office of War Information. After leaving the OWI he founded the Roper Center for Public Opinion Research at the Williams College in 1947.

From 1956 he served as chairman of board of directors of Fund for the Republic succeeding Paul G. Hoffman.

Roper Opinion Research Company (the "Roper Poll") was later renamed Roper Starch Worldwide Company and eventually acquired by NOP World and then GfK in 2005.

== Personal life and family ==
His son, Bud Roper, was also a pollster.

== See also ==
- Harry S. Truman 1948 presidential campaign
