= Public Opinion Quarterly =

- Cover of 2025 issue
- Discipline: Communication studies, political science
- Language: English
- Edited by: Eric Plutzer, Allyson Holbrook

Publication details
- History: 1937-present
- Publisher: Oxford University Press for the American Association for Public Opinion Research
- Frequency: Quarterly
- Impact factor: 3.4 (2022)

Standard abbreviations
- ISO 4: Public Opin. Q.

Indexing
- CODEN: POPQAE
- ISSN: 0033-362X (print); 1537-5331 (web)
- LCCN: 38005920
- OCLC no.: 45001845

Links
- Journal homepage; Online access; Online archive

Public Opinion Quarterly is a peer-reviewed academic journal published by Oxford University Press for the American Association for Public Opinion Research, covering communication studies, political science, current public opinion, and survey research and methodology. It was established in 1937 and according to the Journal Citation Reports, the journal has a 2022 impact factor of 3.4.

The journal was originally sponsored by Princeton University's Woodrow Wilson School of Public and International Affairs. Its first editor-in-chief was former diplomat DeWitt Clinton Poole and past editors included Howard Schuman, Stanley Presser, Eleanor Singer, and James Druckman.

== See also ==
- List of political science journals
- Journal of Survey Statistics and Methodology
- International Journal of Public Opinion Research
