= American Association for Public Opinion Research =

US organization

- Abbreviation: AAPOR
- Established: 1947
- Headquarters: 1436 Duke Street, Alexandria, VA 22314
- Members: 2,045 (2025)
- Publication: Public Opinion Quarterly, Survey Practice, Journal of Survey Statistics and Methodology
- Website: aapor.org

The American Association for Public Opinion Research (AAPOR) is a professional organization of more than 2,000 public opinion and survey research professionals in the United States and from around the world, with members from academia, media, government, the non-profit sector and private industry. AAPOR publishes three academic journals: Public Opinion Quarterly, Survey Practice and the Journal of Survey Statistics and Methodology. It holds an annual research conference and maintains a "Code of Professional Ethics and Practices", for survey research which all members agree to follow. The association's founders include pioneering pollsters Archibald Crossley, George Gallup, and Elmo Roper.

AAPOR's stated principle is that public opinion research is essential to a healthy democracy, providing information crucial to informed policy-making and giving voice to people's beliefs, attitudes and desires. Through its annual conference, standards and ethics codes and publications, AAPOR seeks to promote a better public understanding of the role of public opinion research in a democracy, as well as the sound and ethical conduct and use of public opinion research.

== Standards and ethics ==
Promoting standards and ethics is central AAPOR's mission. The individuals who are members of AAPOR agree to observe the organization's Code of Professional Ethics and Practices that define and mandate the proper practice of public opinion and survey research with the appropriate use of research results. The Code is designed to express fundamental principles that apply to the conduct of research regardless of an individual's membership in AAPOR. Adherence to the principles and actions set out in the Code is possible for of all public opinion and survey researchers, whether they are AAPOR members or not.

Under the Code, practitioners of survey research are expected to conduct their research with care, taking all reasonable steps to assure the reliability and validity of the results and communicate their methods and findings accurately with appropriate detail. The AAPOR code details the standards for dealing with research participants and identifiable information. And it indicates the need to provide clients with all information regarding possible research limitations and the need for disclosure.

The latest revision was approved in April 2021.

=== Transparency Initiative ===
In October 2014, AAPOR launched the Transparency Initiative (TI) to encourage research organizations to disclose their methodological procedures fully and rigorously when reporting survey-based findings. AAPOR established a set of principles for disclosure and then invited organizations to apply to join the TI effort and be recognized for their promise to comply with the guidelines. Joining the TI does not imply any judgment about the quality or rigor of the methods being disclosed. The purpose of TI is to promote understanding of the relationship between methodology and survey quality, increase adherence to AAPOR's Code of Professional Ethics and Practices and enable members of the media and the public to evaluate survey quality. As of 2023, there are 98 members.

== Membership ==
As an organization, AAPOR primarily focuses on survey methodology and survey and public opinion research. AAPOR members work on everything from political polls, to government surveys, to academic experiments and studies. AAPOR members not only conduct survey research, but they also teach courses for universities, professional organizations, and/or within their place of employment.

=== Diversity Initiative ===
In 2016, AAPOR adopted a diversity initiative to help increase diversity within the organization as well as in the professional field. For example, affinity groups are supported. These are voluntary associations of AAPOR members around topics related to professional interests or personal affinities. In 2017, the cross-cultural and multilingual research affinity group became the first group formally recognized by AAPOR. In 2019, an article in AAPOR's e-journal Survey Practice provided examples of two women leaders' professional pathways and how AAPOR as a professional organization contributed to their development. In 2023, the W.E.B. Du Bois Fellowship in Support of Diversity and Inclusion was launched as a joint project with the Roper Center for Public Opinion Research at Cornell University with a focus on graduates students who identify as a member of a racial or ethnic minority group that has been underrepresented in the field of polling research.

=== AAPOR Awards ===
Each year, AAPOR presents a portfolio of awards to recognize distinguished work in the profession, as well as to further the education of students and early career researchers; these awards are the highest honors given by the AAPOR.

- The Warren J. Mitofsky Innovators Award
- The Seymour Sudman Student Paper Competition
- The Burns "Bud" Roper Fellow Award
- The AAPOR Policy Impact Award
- The AAPOR Book Award
- The WAPOR/AAPOR Janet A. Harkness Student Paper Award
- The AAPOR Public Service Award
- The Student Conference Award
- The Student-Faculty Diversity Pipeline Awards
- The AAPOR Award (lifetime achievement)
AAPOR Lifetime Achievement Awardees from the present to 1955

2015 Nancy Mathiowetz
2014 Jon A. Krosnick
2013 Floyd J. Fowler Jr.
2012 Daniel Yankelovich
2011 Stanley Presser
2010 Michael W. Traugott
2009 Elizabeth Martin
2008 Kathleen Frankovic
2007 Harry O'Neill
2006 Norman H. Nie
2005 Andrew Kohut
2004 Benjamin I. Page
2003 Don A. Dillman & Frank Stanton
2002 Tom W. Smith
2001 Robert Groves
2000 Philip Meyer
1999 Charles Cannell & Warren J. Mitofsky
1998 Albert E. Gollin
1997 Irving Crespi
1996 Eleanor Singer
1995 Herbert I. Abelson
1994 Howard Schuman
1993 Jack Elinson
1992 James Davis
1991 Joe Belden
1990 Herbert E. Krugman
1989 Gladys Engel Lang & Kurt Lang
1988 Burns W. Roper
1987 Norman Bradburn & Seymour Sudman
1986 Philip Converse
1985 Daniel Katz
1984 Ithiel de Sola Pool
1983 Paul K. Perry
1982 Paul B. Sheatsley, Matilda White Riley,
John R. Riley Jr. & Wilbur Schramm
1981 Lester R. Frankel
1980 Shirley A. Star
1979 Mervin D. Field
1978 W. Phillips Davison
1977 Leo Bogart
1976 Joseph T. Klapper
1975 Raymond A. Bauer
1974 Bernard Berelson
1973 Rensis Likert
1972 Jean Stoetzel
1971 Walter Lippman
1970 Archibald M. Crossley
1969 Roper Public Opinion Research Center
1968 Elmo C. Wilson
1967 Hans Zeisel
1966 Hadley Cantril
1965 Harry H. Field
1964 Harold D. Lasswell
1963 George H. Gallup
1962 Angus Campbell
Julian Woodward Award
1961 Fund for the Republic
1960 Clyde W. Hart
1959 Elmo Roper
1958 Samuel A. Stouffer
1957 Public Opinion Quarterly
1956 Herbert H. Hyman
1955 Paul F. Lazarsfeld

== Reports ==
As needed, AAPOR may commission a working group to address topical issues relating to the survey research industry. These working groups produce reports to introduce new methods, address methodological concerns or provide guidance on the application of specific research methods. Here are some of those Task Force Reports:

- June, 2021 - AAPOR/WAPOR Task Force Report on Quality in Comparative Surveys
- April, 2008 – AAPOR Cell Phone Task Force Report
- February 12, 2015 Task Force Report on Big Data
- September 8, 2014 – Current Knowledge and Considerations Regarding Survey Refusals
- May 30, 2014 – Social Media and Public Opinion Research: Report of the AAPOR Task Force on Emerging Technologies in Public Opinion Research
- May 12, 2014 – Mobile Technologies for Conducting, Augmenting and Potentially Replacing Surveys: Report of the AAPOR Task Force on Emerging Technologies in Public Opinion Research
- September 2, 2013 – Polling and Democracy: Report of the AAPOR Task Force on Public Opinion and Leadership
- May 17, 2013 – AAPOR Report on Non-Probability Sampling
- October 7, 2012 – AAPOR Statement on Understanding a "credibility interval"
- October 28, 2010 – AAPOR 2010 Cell Phone Task Force Report
- March 24, 2010 – AAPOR Opt In Online Panel Task Force Report
- May 16, 2009 – Report to the AAPOR Standards Committee on the status of Human Subjects Protection Training Requirements
- March 30, 2009 – An Evaluation of the Methodology of the 2008 Pre-Election Primary Polls: Report of ad hoc AAPOR Committee on the 2008 Presidential Primary Polling
- April, 2008 – AAPOR Cell Phone Task Force Report
- January 1, 2008 – Pre-Election Polling in New Hampshire: What Went Wrong?

== Meetings ==
AAPOR holds an annual conference on public opinion and survey research and their methodologies and applications. According to AAPOR's history publication A Meeting Place and More, it holds a "central importance" at the organization. The 75th Anniversary conference in 2020 was the only conference that was planned as an in-person meeting and converted to a virtual meeting due to the COVID-19 pandemic. AAPOR also sponsors short courses, webinars, and affinity group meetings. These events provide a platform for scholars and practitioners to exchange research, job opportunities and ideas with each other.

== Presidents ==
AAPOR Presidents from 1947 to the present
- 1947–48 Clyde W. Hart
- 1948–49 Elmo C. Wilson
- 1949–50 Paul F. Lazarsfeld
- 1950–51 Julian L. Woodward
- 1951–52 Bernard Berelson
- 1952–53 Archibald Crossley
- 1953–54 Samuel A. Stouffer
- 1954–55 George H. Gallup
- 1955–56 Harry Alpert
- 1956–57 Gerhart D. Wiebe
- 1957–58 Frederick F. Stephan
- 1958–59 David Wallace
- 1959–60 Herbert H. Hyman
- 1960–61 Robert O. Carlson
- 1961–62 John W. Riley Jr.
- 1962–63 Joseph T. Klapper
- 1963–64 Charles Y. Glock
- 1964–65 Herbert E. Krugman
- 1965–66 Raymond A. Bauer
- 1966–67 Leo Bogart
- 1967–68 Paul B. Sheatsley
- 1968–69 Robert N. Ford
- 1969–70 Robert T. Bower
- 1970–71 Richard H. Baxter
- 1971–72 W. Phillips Davison
- 1972–73 Sidney Hollander
- 1973–74 Harold Mendelsohn
- 1974–75 Herbert I. Abelson
- 1975–76 Richard Maisel
- 1976–77 Irving Crespi
- 1977–78 Hope Lunin Klapper
- 1978–79 Reuben Cohen
- 1979–80 Jack Elinson
- 1980–81 Helen J. Kaufmann
- 1981–82 Seymour Sudman
- 1982–83 Burns W. Roper
- 1983–84 Laure M. Sharp
- 1984–85 Albert E. Gollin
- 1985–86 Howard Schuman
- 1986–87 J. Ronald Milavsky
- 1987–88 Eleanor Singer
- 1988–89 Warren J. Mitofsky
- 1989–90 Philip Meyer
- 1990–91 Joan S. Black
- 1991–92 Norman Bradburn
- 1992–93 Kathleen A. Frankovic
- 1993–94 Stanley Presser
- 1994–95 Andrew Kohut
- 1995–96 Robert M. Groves
- 1996–97 Diane Colasanto
- 1997–98 James R. Beniger
- 1998–99 Michael R. Kagay
- 1999–00 Michael W. Traugott
- 2000–01 Murray Edelman
- 2001–02 Don A. Dillman
- 2002–03 Mark A. Schulman
- 2003–04 Elizabeth (Betsy) Martin
- 2004–05 Nancy Belden
- 2005–06 Cliff Zukin
- 2006–07 Robert P. Daves
- 2007–08 Nancy A. Mathiowetz
- 2008–09 Richard A. Kulka
- 2009–10 Peter V. Miller
- 2010–11 Frank M. Newport
- 2011–12 Scott Keeter
- 2012–13 Paul J. Lavrakas
- 2013–14 Robert Santos
- 2014–15 Michael W. Link
- 2015-16 Mollyann Brodie
- 2016-17 Roger Tourangeau
- 2017-18 Tim Johnson
- 2018-19 David Dutwin
- 2019-20 Nora Cate Schaeffer
- 2020-21 Dan Merkle
- 2021-22 Patricia Moy

== See also ==
- American Statistical Association
- ESOMAR (European Society for Opinion and Marketing Research)
- European Survey Research Association (ESRA)
- Insights Association, a merger of CASRO and MRA
- Survey methodology
- World Association for Public Opinion Research (WAPOR)
