= Warren Mitofsky =

American political pollster

Warren J. Mitofsky (September 17, 1934 – September 1, 2006) was an American political pollster.

Mitofsky graduated in 1957 from Guilford College and was executive director of the CBS News election and survey unit from 1967 to 1990. He also previously served as an executive producer of CBS election night broadcasts.

Prior to CBS, Mitofsky worked with the Census Bureau where he designed a number of surveys. Along with Joseph Waksberg, Mitofsky is credited with developing an efficient method of sampling telephone numbers using random digit dialing, which has since been widely adopted as a sampling method.

Mitofsky is credited with having invented the exit poll.

Warren Mitofsky is listed among the United States Census Bureau's Notable Alumni. In 1989 he was elected as a Fellow of the American Statistical Association. In 1999, the American Association for Public Opinion Research presented him with its lifetime achievement award for his "continuing concern for survey quality."

In November 2004, Mitofsky was interviewed by PBS NewsHour regarding what went wrong with the accuracy of his exit polls for the 2004 U.S. presidential election. Early poll results were leaked which showed John Kerry leading George W. Bush, conflicting with the final official outcome. Mitofsky said he suspected that the difference arose because "the Kerry voters were more anxious to participate in our exit polls than the Bush voters." He refused, consistently, to release precinct-level polling data from Ohio to researchers who maintained that the election results were fraudulent, and his own exit polls were a more accurate picture of the vote.

He died on September 1, 2006, in New York City of an aortic aneurysm, aged 71.

The Roper Center for Public Opinion Research awards an annual Warren J. Mitofsky Award for Excellence in Public Opinion Research.

== Mitofsky International ==
In 1993 Mitofsky founded Mitofsky International, a survey research company. Its primary business is conducting exit polls for major elections around the world. It does this work exclusively for news organizations. Mitofsky has directed exit polls and quick counts since 1967 for almost 3,000 electoral contests. He has the distinction of conducting the first national presidential exit polls in the United States, Russia, Mexico and the Philippines.

Along with CESSI, Ltd., Mitofsky International were the only exit polls for the Russian presidential elections in 1996 and 2000. It was the only provider of exit polling and quick counts reported by the Mexican broadcast industry for its 1994 presidential election.
