= Sebastian Valenzuela =

Chilean behavioral scientist (born 1973)

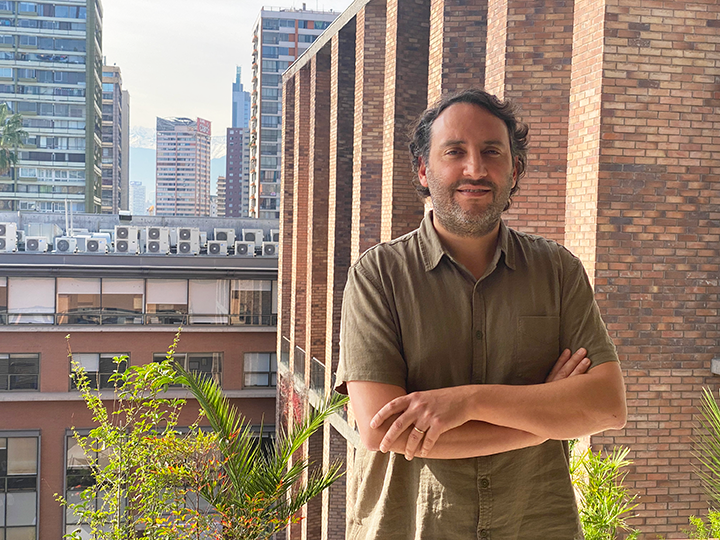
- Valenzuela
- Born: 1978 (age 47–48)
- Education: UT Austin; Pontifical Catholic University of Chile
- Known for: Agenda setting theory Behavioral science
- Scientific career
- Fields: Communication studies Journalism; Political communication
- Workplaces: Pontifical Catholic University of Chile

Sebastián Valenzuela (born in 1978) is a Chilean academic and researcher specializing in political communication, journalism, and social media. He is a Professor at the School of Communications at the Pontifical Catholic University of Chile Pontifical Catholic University of Chile) and Chief Science Officer of the International Panel on the Information Environment International Panel on the Information Environment. Valenzuela's research has gained international recognition and has been featured in media outlets such as the BBC, The New Yorker, Time, and The Wall Street Journal.

== Education and career ==
Valenzuela obtained his Ph.D. in Mass Communication from the University of Texas at Austin. His research focuses on the intersection of digital media and political engagement, particularly in Latin American contexts. He has authored over 80 peer-reviewed publications and has received awards from international academic associations, including the International Communication Association, the Association for Education in Journalism and Mass Communication (AEJMC), and the World Association for Public Opinion Research (WAPOR).

He serves as the Director for Research and Creation at the School of Communications at the Pontifical Catholic University of Chile and is the editor-in-chief of Cuadernos.info, a leading communication journal in Latin America.

== Work and influence ==
Valenzuela is one of the leading scientists of information and communication in Latin America. His research primarily focuses on three key areas. First, he examines how social media impacts civic engagement, information spread, and mental health. Second, he investigates how news media shape public opinion both emotionally and cognitively. Lastly, he explores the causes and effects of casual political discussions. Valenzuela's research explores the role of journalism and social media in shaping public opinion and democratic participation. He has extensively studied the dissemination of misinformation, the impact of alternative media, and the role of digital platforms in political activism.

One of his notable studies, "News Sharing of Alternative Versus Traditional Media After the 2019 Chilean Protests," published in Social Media + Society, analysed how different media sources influenced public discourse during the 2019 protests in Chile. The study found significant differences in how alternative and mainstream media were shared on social platforms, highlighting the role of digital media in modern political movements.

He is one of the leading researchers of modern Agenda setting theory, which argues that the framing of news stories and issues that shape public opinion is largely shaped by the media. With Maxwell McCombs, Valenzuela argues that for most topics, people primarily rely on a single source of information--the news. By setting the agenda, the media can influence the perceived significance of certain events or issues.

== Affiliations and Awards ==
In 2024 Valenzuela was appointed Chief Science Officer of the International Panel on the Information Environment, an organization he helped launch. His contributions to the field of political communication have been acknowledged with multiple awards from prestigious academic organizations. Valenzuela has been a Fulbright Scholar Valenzuela is an Associate Researcher at the Millennium Institute for Foundational Research on Data (IMFD) in Chile, where he leads an interdisciplinary research group focused on misinformation and public opinion.

== Selected works ==
- S Valenzuela, A Arriagada, A Scherman, "The social media basis of youth protest behavior: The case of Chile", Journal of Communication 62 (2), 299-314, https://doi.org/10.1111/j.1460-2466.2012.01635.x
- S Valenzuela, C Muñiz, M Santos, "Social Media and Belief in Misinformation in Mexico: A Case of Maximal Panic, Minimal Effects?", The International Journal of Press/Politics 29 (3), 667-688, https://doi.org/10.1177/194016122210889.
- I Bachmann, S Valenzuela, "Studying the downstream effects of fact-checking on social media: Experiments on correction formats, belief accuracy, and media trust", Social Media + Society 9 (2), https://doi.org/10.1177/2056305123117969.
