= Heresthetic =

Political Science approach to manipulate decision making process for winning

Heresthetic is a theoretical approach within political science that examines how political actors strategically manipulate the structure of political situations, decision-making processes, and agenda-setting to achieve favorable outcomes even when they lack majority support. The term was coined by political scientist William H. Riker in the 1980s, combining the Greek words "hairesis" (choosing) and "rhetoric" to describe tactics beyond mere persuasion.

Heresthetic belongs to the tradition of positive political theory, incorporating elements from game theory, public choice theory, rational choice theory, and social choice theory to analyze strategic political behavior. While rhetoric focuses on persuading others to change their preferences, heresthetic involves restructuring the political environment to achieve victory using opponents' existing preferences. Common heresthetic strategies include dimension manipulation, strategic voting, agenda control, and the introduction of new alternatives to split opposing coalitions. The concept has been influential in understanding political maneuvering in legislative politics, electoral systems, and constitutional design.

== Description ==
Riker argues that herestheticians win because they compel or persuade others to join them in voting or political coalitions. Heresthetic focuses both on the use of rhetoric and political strategy. Riker argues that there are three vital components to heresthetic.

1. Agenda control: political agents may structure debate in ways that highlight favorable or eliminate undesirable policy alternatives. Depending upon the order that policy options are discussed, debate can produce different outcomes, including outcomes that are not preferred by the heresthetician. The order of choice matters. Riker's concept of agenda control differs from conventional accounts of agenda-setting involving policy-makers, which focus on how policy-makers’ agendas are influenced by exogenous factors, such as the media and public opinion. Riker's focus is on how policy-makers affect the ordering of items on the political agenda, and how that ordering can be manipulated.
2. Strategic voting: in deliberative settings herestheticians can take advantage of voting procedures to influence outcomes. For example, agents may vote against their own interest in the short-term to secure a better long-term position. Another element of strategic voting is vote trading. Policy-makers may informally trade votes with others in exchange for future votes or benefits. Strategic voting is common in legislative settings because of open rules and sequential voting procedures.
3. Dimension manipulation: herestheticians can manipulate the dimensionality of political decision-making by introducing new dimensions or modifying existing framing. Dimension manipulation can either expand a decision-making space by reconfiguring acceptable topics of debate and policy alternatives, or shrink dimensions by eliminating certain topics or alternatives. The manipulation of dimensions is important because once an agent manipulates framing, it cannot be removed from debate.

These components allow herestheticians to manipulate political outcomes by structuring debate, rhetorically or structurally, to be more advantageous to their preferred position.

== Example ==
The British Parliament is scheduling upcoming referendum votes to determine Scottish independence from the United Kingdom and if the UK should remain a member of the European Union. A member of parliament who has influence on how the votes will be structured, has a preference that Scotland will remain in union with the UK and that the UK will leave the EU. Scottish independence and the UK remaining a member of the EU is an undesirable outcome for the MP. While polling indicates that a majority of Scottish voters do not support independence, voters are more likely to support independence if the UK leaves the EU. In order to receive his preferred outcome, the MP seeks for the referendum votes to be held in a sequence in which Scottish independence is determined first, and then UK withdrawal from the EU. This voting sequence demonstrates how herestheticians can manipulate the decision-making process so they can win.

== See also ==
- Agenda-setting theory
- Choice modelling
- Opportunism
- Political economy
- Tactical voting
- Voting systems
