= William H. Riker =

American political scientist (1920–1993)

- Born: September 22, 1920; Des Moines, Iowa, U.S.
- Died: June 26, 1993 (aged 72); Rochester, New York, U.S.
- Education: DePauw University; Harvard University
- Known for: Positive political theory
- Spouse: Mary Elizabeth Lewis (m. 1943)
- Scientific career
- Fields: Political science
- Workplaces: Lawrence University; University of Rochester

William Harrison Riker (September 22, 1920 – June 26, 1993) was an American political scientist known for applying game theory and mathematics to political science. He helped establish University of Rochester as a center of the behavioral revolution in political science.

== Early life and education ==
William Harrison Riker was born on September 22, 1920, in Des Moines, Iowa. He had 4 children, 2 sons and 2 daughters, with wife Mary Elizabeth. He earned his bachelor's degree in economics at Indiana's DePauw University in 1942 and received his Ph.D. at Harvard University in 1948. While a student at DePauw, he was initiated into the Delta Kappa Epsilon fraternity. Before his Ph.D., Riker worked at the RCA (then Radio Corporation of America), where he worked as a time-and-motion analyst.

== Academic career ==
Riker took on a professorship at Lawrence University in Appleton, Wisconsin (then Lawrence College), where he published The Theory of Political Coalitions (1962). In 1962, he became the chair of the Political Science Department at the University of Rochester, where he remained chair until 1977, and remained active until his death.

Riker was elected to the National Academy of Sciences in 1974.

Riker founded the now-mainstream field of positive political theory, which introduced game theory and the axiomatic method of social choice theory to political science. Bruce Bueno de Mesquita and Kenneth Shepsle in their memoir write that "These have proved crucial to predictive tests for political theory." Riker is also often credited with being the founder of rational choice theory with his work on applying economic theory to mathematical models of politics.

Among other contributions, Riker is known for work on the theory and history of federalism and on what he called "heresthetic"—the art of changing political outcomes without changing peoples' underlying preferences by manipulating the decision-making process, for example by changing the order in which decisions are made. In his book Liberalism Against Populism, he argued that the instability of majority rule, demonstrated in Arrow's impossibility theorem and the McKelvey–Schofield chaos theorem, meant that "populist" interpretations of democracy as implementing a collective will of the people were untenable. Instead, democratic leaders aimed to build disparate coalitions; a piece of successful coalition-building could cause realigning elections, in which blocs of voters swiftly changed their allegiance.

Concerning political coalition for the benefit of minorities, Riker argued that the larger the coalition, the shorter-lived it is. In his book The Theory of Political Coalitions (1962), Riker argued that in situations where there is conflict over finite resources, actors will seek to create coalitions that are large enough to ensure that they get access to the resources, but that the coalitions will not be larger than that (because the actors will not want to dilute the resources more than they have to).

The William H. Riker Prize for excellence in undergraduate teaching is awarded by the University of Rochester bi-annually in his honor. The Political Economy section of the American Political Science Association awards an annual book prize in his name as well.

== Publications ==
- Riker, William H. Soldiers of the States: The Role of the National Guard in American Democracy. Washington: Public Affairs Press, 1957.
- ____. “The Paradox of Voting and Congressional Rules for Voting on. Amendments.” American Political Science Review. 52, 1958: 349–366.
- ____. The Theory of Political Coalitions. New Haven: Yale University Press, 1962.
- ____. "Federalism: Origin, Operation, Significance". Boston: Little, Brown, 1964.
- ____. "Towards a Positive Political Theory", Englewood Cliffs, NJ: Prentice Hall, 1973.
- ____. "Implications from the Disequilibrium of Majority Rule for the Study of Institutions," American Political Science Review, 74, 1980: 432–446. JSTOR 1960638
- ____. Liberalism Against Populism. San Francisco: W. H. Freeman, 1982.
- ____. "The Heresthetics of Constitution-Making: The Presidency in 1787, with Comments on Determinism and Rational Choice." American Political Science Review, 78, 1984: 1–16.
- ____. The Art of Political Manipulation. New Haven: Yale University Press, 1986.
- ____. The Strategy of Rhetoric. New Haven: Yale University Press, 1996.

== See also ==
- Duverger's law
