= Political agenda =

Policies a person or organization wants to enact

In politics, a political agenda is a list of subjects or problems (issues) to which government officials as well as individuals outside the government are paying serious attention to at any given time. The political agenda is most often shaped by political and policy elites but can also be influenced by activist groups, private sector lobbyists, think tanks, courts, world events, and the degree of state centralisation. Media coverage has also been linked to the success of the rise of political parties and their ability to get their ideas on the agenda (agenda-setting). Although the media does often have an effect on the political agenda, these results are not always immediate, which can produce a lag in the political agenda.

== Who can affect the political agenda ==
The political agenda can be influenced by multiple institutional and non-institutional actors acting independently or concurrently, including political office-holders, interest groups, social movements, and other entities.

Although these actors, most notably the media, often have an effect on the political agenda, these results are not always immediate. Time lags in the political agenda can last from a few weeks to several months. This time lag can depend on a few factors including the method used to communicate an issue, the relevance of an issue in current conversations or news cycles, and the awareness or understanding of an issue to the public. According to a study by Schweickart et al., blogs, Twitter, speeches, and news releases are the most effective methods to affect political agenda setting. Schweickart et al.’s study also found that the timing of the election cycle is impactful. Schweickart et al. found that around a president's midterm, congress is more likely to influence the presidential agenda using different media platforms.

=== Political and policy elites ===
The political agenda is essentially defined as what governmental officials find important to discuss. Those closest to the policy process have the biggest control on what issues reach the political agenda. They are the ones with the most power to decide which ideas or issues have the most importance, and which ideas or issues are unimportant. Political elites also have considerable ability to determine how issues on the political agenda are debated, in terms of order, framing, and substance. For example, the President of the United States, has the power to make treaties, appoint ambassadors, appoint justices of the Supreme Court, and shape public and institutional debate around these actions. These types of powers ultimately shape what issues reach the political agenda and how they are discussed thereafter.

=== Activist and interest groups ===
Interest groups are organizations of people who have similar goals that they are trying to achieve, usually through policy and government action. Different types of interest groups, including business, industry, laborers, and public interest groups, utilize agenda to affect policy processes at multiple government levels. Some non-governmental activist groups, such as neighborhood associations, advocate for civic beautification or improvement of communities. Many other important activist groups, like those oriented towards human rights and social justice, campaign for broad ideals. These groups work to put continuous pressure on government leaders that shape the agenda. If enough pressure is exerted onto political leaders through activist groups, it can change which issues and ideas ultimately reach the political agenda. For example, the American Bar Association (ABA) and the American Medical Association (AMA), usually try to influence politicians on professional jobs.

=== Think tanks ===
Think tanks are in need of financial backing. Most times wealthy and established investors who wish to advance a certain idea or cause onto the political agenda establish them. These issues or causes may include: economics, taxes, foreign policy, global development, education, children and families, or healthcare. Examples of think tanks that promote a certain political perspective onto the political agenda are the Heritage Foundation and American Enterprise Institute which are highly conservative. On the other side, the Center for American Progress, are more liberal with their motives.

=== Courts ===
When the courts make a decision that changes a previous line of thinking, that idea immediately is on the political agenda because laws and public administration must change accordingly. The Mabo decision by the High Court in 1992 which overturned previous laws about establishing native titles is an example of this.

=== Media ===
The media is tightly linked to what issues gain importance on the political agenda. It affects what ideas become widespread and therefore what is demanded from politicians. Numerous studies have done research to prove this. According to a study by Iyengar and McGrady, if the media attracts enough attention to a particular issue for a longer period of time the public's view of an issue can change or shift as a result. The media is one of the biggest influences of political agenda setting based on what topics news outlets choose to cover.

Hajo B Boomgaarden and Rens Vliegenthart write on the media's relation to political agenda in their article Explaining the rise of anti-immigrant parties: The role of news media content. In this article they study the media coverage on anti-immigration in the Netherlands for the period of 1990 to 2002 and found that it directly relates to the success of anti-immigration populist parties such as Centrumdemocraten (CD), the Centrum Partij (CP), and the Lijst Pim Fortuyn (LPF) during the same time period. Their analysis used the importance of news media as the explanatory factor of why anti-immigration gained prevalence on the political agenda, while controlling for other real world factors and developments at the time such as the influence of the economy, immigration, or the leadership of then President Pim Fortuyn. This was done by conducting a content analysis of five of the most popular Dutch national newspapers. The empirical results showed support of anti-immigration was around 4% in 1994, and rose to 16% in 2001 during the same time that media coverage of anti-immigration was at its peak. This means, the test showed that media content can be held at least partly responsible for the rise of anti-immigrant parties in the Netherlands and the changing of the political agenda in this way.

A similar study done by Julie Sevenans, Stefaan Walgrave & Gwendolyn Joanna Epping compares the behavior of politicians in comparison to the media on a global scale. The study was completed during one week, in Flemish Belgium. Every day, eight news outlets were studied and fully coded for a total of 2448 cases. The study looked at individual politicians cognitive attention for these specific news stories, via a face-to face survey of MPs to see if they recalled, had talked about, or considered the content covered in these news outlets. The results showed that the prominence and usefulness of a news story affect whether a news story is noticed, talked about or considered by MPs. This work showed that political agenda-setting effects most likely begin from the selective adoption on the cognitive, and individual level of MPs. Politicians both consume the news much how regular citizens by paying more attention the most prominent stories. However, they are also selective in that they pay the most attention to news that is political in nature or match their interests. More specifically, politicians pay more attention to: news that is more prominent, about the region their parliament is responsible for, issues they are personally specialized in, news about issues that are salient for their party, and news about politics. All of these claims were confirmed by statistical analysis. Relating to the political agenda, the implications of the fact that MPs care so much about media reports are twofold: some MPs may think media coverage is reflective of public opinion, while others may feel the media affect what the public sees as important. In either case, politicians are interpreting that the public cares about major news stories and taking this into account when setting the political agenda.

George Edwards and Dan Wood conducted a time series analysis of presidential, mass media and congressional attention to five political issues: crime, education, health care, U.S.-Soviet relations, and the Arab-Israeli conflict. The end conclusion was that most of the time presidents react corresponding to fluctuations in media attention on an issue. It too showed a relationship between the media and political agenda.

=== World events ===
When something unexpected happens it can force the political agenda to change immediately. For example, when Hurricane Katrina devastated New Orleans, the United States responded by sending emergency disaster aid to the affected areas and several organizations set up donation funds. After the 9/11 World Trade Center attacks, national security and anti-terrorism efforts became a top priority for the government. Big world events can change the priority of certain issues for the public. When big world events (i.e. disasters/tragedies) occur they are often followed by a policy response as well, and so what issues and ideas reach the political agenda are sometimes changed simply due to what happened in the world.

== Varying theories on who sets the political agenda ==
There are three main theories on how political agendas are set and which groups have the greatest say in the decisions regarding them. They are; the pluralist theory, the elitist theory, and the institutional theory.

=== The pluralist theory ===
The pluralist theory suggests that policy-making is divided into several categories or “arenas”. Groups that do not have any power in one particular arena, most often have power in another arena. The pluralist theory is based on the democratic system. In a representative democracy, citizens vote for the representatives who will make policy decisions on their behalf. There are also special votes where citizens are able to directly weigh in on issues through a referendum. There is a marketplace for competing policies, and interests, and any group may win the arena. Elections often determine who gets to decide on each public policy.

=== The elitist theory ===
In the elitist theory a main power elite dominates the entire agenda setting process to serve their own interests. These interests hold the power in all the arenas and they always win every election. There are very few people that actually organize into separate interest groups. In order to retain power and control, the main elite works at keeping key issues off the agenda. This suppression of issues threatens democracy.

=== The institutional theory ===
This theory believes that legislative committees and bureaucratic institutions are the main controllers of the agenda. Because social interests and issues have much impact on what is considered by the legislative committees and bureaucratic institutions, individuals do not benefit from agenda decisions. This type of system leads to more conservative policy decisions than those under the pluralist scenario, but far more conservative than under the elite scenario.

== Political agenda and state centralization ==
The political agenda is tied to state centralization because the more centralized a state is, the more political elites have control over the political agenda. However, if a state is too centralized, the more the public may feel they need to advocate to change the political agenda as well. The political agenda can be further broken down into two concepts: the political agenda effect, and the escalation effect.

=== The political agenda effect ===
The “political agenda effect” asserts that state centralization alters the dynamics of political action and conflict in society. State centralization, which involves elites coordinating nationally, induces citizens to organize nationally as well, rather than at the local or the “parochial” level. When this happens and citizens from different regions, sectors, interests, backgrounds, or ethnicity all join to organize and discuss certain policies their agenda will change in a direction that switches their demands from power-holders to focus more on public goods. In this case then a state that has a higher level of centralization it may incite citizens to try to change the agenda themselves. Therefore, political elites might instead prefer a non-centralized state where they can still maintain more control over the political agenda. Elites may strategically opt for a non-centralized state in order to induce the citizens to not organize nationally and thus avert the political agenda effect.

=== The escalation effect ===
The “escalation effect” contends that if citizens get together, it will force elites to form national resources to fight against them and maintain the political agenda the way they desire. In the case that citizens band together in a national organization, this will entice political elites to also form a national organization and pool their resources together in attempt to fight against the citizens. National organizations created by citizens might have a lower probability of success in comparison to organizations formed by elites, but in either case they will still indirectly benefit the weaker citizen groups, who would have otherwise remained unorganized. An escalation of the conflict can be seen as ensuing in this scenario.

== The impact agenda ==
The impact agenda is the increasing requirements for researchers to prove that there are real world impacts from their research. Specifically, it describes how there are increasing requirements set out by the state for researchers to relate their studies to real world issues in order to validate their research and access government funding. The beginnings of the concept of the “impact agenda” can be traced to William Waldegrave's 1993 white paper “Realizing Our Potential”. The relevance of the impact agenda is shown by the fact that the Biological and Sciences Research Council announced in 2012 that it expects its institutes to detail impact. This idea has been heavily criticized by scientists for allowing non-scientists to pick winners and losers and for constraining researchers to only create an impact that is aligned with the government's political agenda.

== Models of political agenda building ==
Roger Cobb, Jennie Keith Ross and Marc Howard Ross developed the “models of agenda building” theory to specify three different models: the outside initiative model, mobilization model, and inside initiative model. These models are designed to show the different ways the political agenda changes. The study related success of an idea being translated from the "public agenda" (being discussed regularly) to the “formal agenda” (government taking serious considerations into making changes in that specific area). Success in this study meant an issue was placed on the formal agenda and given attention by decision makers. Results showed that achieving agenda status is more difficult in modern nations than in smaller nations rooted in face-to-face interaction. More specifically:

1. The more homogeneous a society is, the higher the ability to achieve agenda status
2. A higher internal migration rate and population increase, means achieving agenda status will be more difficult
3. The higher amount of potential agendas in which a specific issue may be placed, the higher the success rate of reaching the political agenda
4. The fewer issues around redistribution of material resources in a given society, the greater the chance of reaching the political agenda

The study also found that there are components of political agendas that hold true across nations and across different models:

1. The greater the proportion of issues not reaching the formal agenda, the higher the level of discontent and political instability within the wider community
2. As the time gap between an issue being raised and it reaching formal agenda status increases, so does public instability

=== Outside initiative model ===
The outside initiative model discusses the process where issues arise in non-governmental organizations and then are expanded to reach the formal agenda. The order of events starts with a grievance, an expansion of interest supported by nongovernmental groups, and then an exertion of pressure onto decision makers. It is about the process through which issues arise in non-governmental groups and are then expanded sufficiently to reach, first the public agenda and then the formal agenda. The outside initiative model is most prevalent in egalitarian societies.

=== The mobilization model ===
The mobilization model is focused around political agenda issues that are initiated within government and subsequently reach the public agenda and formal agenda status. Its focus is on the internal mechanism and how politicians work to get ideas formalized onto the agenda. However, success in implementation does require support from the public under this model as well. The mobilization model is most commonly linked with hierarchical societies, or those societies which emphasize a wide gap between the leader and his or her followers.

=== Inside initiative model ===
The inside initiative model describes when issues are initiated within government, but supporters make no effort to expand it to the public. It is a model that is opposed to public participation. Instead, supporters of the issues rely solely on their own ability to apply the right amount of pressure to ensure formal agenda status. The inside access model is most often seen in societies with high concentrations of wealth and status.

== See also ==
- Political agenda making
  - Agenda building
  - Agenda-setting
- Entities and factors in political agenda making
  - Demagogue
  - Political ethics
- Tools of political agenda making
  - Guerrilla marketing
  - Heresthetic
  - Indoctrination
  - Influencer marketing
  - Media manipulation
  - Propaganda
  - Social influence
- Other relevant concepts
  - Political ethics
  - Media transparency
