= Gary Woodward =

American author and professor (born 1946)

Gary C. Woodward (born July 12, 1946, in Denver, Colorado) is an American author and retired professor who has written about political communication, rhetoric and mass communication.

== Early life ==
Woodward holds degrees in communication and rhetorical theory from California State University at Sacramento and the University of Pittsburgh (PhD 1972). He has taught in both England and the United States.

== Career ==
Woodward was a professor emeritus of rhetorical theory at The College of New Jersey (TCNJ). There, he taught courses in theories of persuasion, argumentation and debate, and the philosophy of communication, and served as chairperson of the Department of Communication Studies. He contributed to the definition of political communication and helped to distinguish the field from political science and mass media studies.

He co-authored two textbooks with Robert E. Denton Jr.: Political Communication in America (first edition 1985, third edition 1999) and Persuasion and Influence in American Life (first edition 1988, eighth edition 2019). These books are used in communication courses at undergraduate and graduate levels, and have been cited in academic books and journals. Woodward is also the sole author of scholarly works on subjects including rhetorical theories, communications philosophy, political media, and listening.

Woodward's research has been supported by awards from the National Endowment for the Humanities, the John F. Kennedy Presidential Library, the Lyndon B. Johnson Presidential Library, CBS, and C-SPAN. He has published guest columns on communications topics for the Trenton Times and NJ.com. He is a member of the National Communication Association, Eastern Communication Association, New Jersey Council for the Humanities, and The Rhetoric Society of America. Woodward authors the blog theperfectresponse.com. and has written articles for several publications, including CNN.com, The Dallas Morning News, the Los Angeles Times, New York Times, and the Christian Science Monitor, among others.

== Selected works ==
Authored works:

- Persuasive Encounters: Case Studies in Constructive Confrontation (1990)
- Perspectives on American Political Media (1997)
- Political Communication in America, 3rd edition (with Robert E. Denton Jr.) (1999)
- The Idea of Identification (2003)
- Center Stage: Media and the Staging of American Politics (2007)
- The Perfect Response: Studies of The Rhetorical Personality (2010)
- The Rhetoric of Intention in Human Affairs (2013)
- Persuasion and Influence in American Life, 8th edition (with Robert E. Denton Jr.) (2019)
- The Sonic Imperative: Sound in the Age of Screens (2021)

== Recognition ==
Woodward was a fellow of the US National Endowment for the Humanities in 1980. He has held leadership positions at the National Communication Association and Eastern Communication Association and has been a speaker and panel chair at their conferences.

Upon its publication in 1986, Political Communication in America was highlighted in American Political Science Review, Presidential Studies Quarterly, Western Political Quarterly, and Journalism and Mass Communication Quarterly. Political Communication in America was selected in 1988 by the Department of Education Office of Educational Research and Improvement as one of thirty important books on "Governmental-Political Communication," and has been cited in scholarly work for over 35 years. Persuasion and Influence in American Life was examined in a meta-analysis published by Communication Education as an effective textbook for teaching persuasion techniques.

The Idea of Identification (2003) was reviewed by The Southern Communication Journal; The Perfect Response: Studies of The Rhetorical Personality (2010), was reviewed in Mass Communication and Society; and The Rhetoric of Intention in Human Affairs (2013) was reviewed by the Kenneth Burke Society. The Sonic Imperative: Sound in the Age of Screens (2021), was highlighted by a presentation to the Sarnoff Collection, a museum dedicated to RCA chairman David Sarnoff's life.

== Personal life ==
Woodward lives in Lambertville, New Jersey.
