= Formal theory (political science) =

Study of politics using formal methods

Formal theory, also known as positive political theory, is the subfield of political science that uses formal methods such as social choice theory, game theory, and statistical analysis to deductively study political phenomena. It seeks to construct and use mathematical models to represent strategic choices in political contexts, such as in elections, legislative policymaking, and international politics. These models can either be tested empirically or used to elucidate real-world political phenomena by highlighting relevant incentives or causal mechanisms.

Much of the original work done in formal theory was motivated by a desire to rigorously explain and analyze political phenomena, in contrast to the emphases on description and value judgment that characterized the discipline of political science before the 1950s. The pursuit of formal theory, its proponents argued, would help make political science more explanatory and predictive and thus more "scientific", helping its scholarship integrate with that of the other social sciences. William H. Riker, the founder of formal theory, wrote of his work:

I describe the field in which I expect to work at the Center as ‘formal, positive political theory.’ By Formal, I mean the expression of the theory in algebraic rather than verbal symbols. By positive I means the expression of descriptive rather than normative propositions…. I visualize the growth in political science of a body of theory somewhat similar to…the neo-classical theory of value in economics. It seems to be that a number of propositions from the mathematical theory of games can be woven into a theory of politics. Hence, my main interest at present is attempting to use game theory for the construction of political theory.

Today, formal theoretic approaches remain influential in political science scholarship, particularly in the American academy and especially at high-ranking university programs and academic journals. However, the subfield has come under a variety of criticisms during its development and history. Some of these include that it has not or cannot be empirically tested, that it merely restates banal truisms using equations, that it lacks any analytical purchase for explaining political phenomena, and that it has no predictive power.

Formal theory is one of the "main" subfields in political science along with American politics, comparative politics, international relations, political economy, political theory, and political methodology. These subfields structure the way research, graduate student instruction, and faculty hiring is done within the discipline at US universities.

== Key Features ==
Formal theory involves the application of tools such as formal modeling, game theory, and empirical methods for causal inference to study political institutions and behaviors. It has also been described as "the use of the tools of economics to study politics." In economics, this type of work is generally referred to as "political economics" or "political economy".

In political analyses using formal theory, social choice theoretic methods are often used to describe and axiomatically analyze the performance of rules or institutions. The outcomes of the rules or institutions described are then analyzed through game theoretic methods, where the individuals or parties or nations involved in a given interaction are modeled as rational agents playing a game, guided by self-interest. Based on this assumption, the outcome of the interactions can be predicted as an equilibrium or equilibria of the game. Many of the tools used in formal theory—such as game theory, bounded and instrumental rationality, utility functions, deductive logic, and modeling—were imported from neoclassical economics.

Formal theory has been used to study democratic institutions such as political bargaining. It allows researchers to determine how outcomes of political bargaining differ based on whether political actors are equals or if power is unevenly distributed. It also permits the identification of institutional and contextual mechanisms that give some group members additional influence in determining collective outcomes. By focusing on the mechanisms, formal theory also allows researchers to determine if outcomes are a result of asymmetric bargaining or deliberative persuasion.

== Development ==
The "father" of formal theory is generally considered to be William H. Riker, although work done by neoclassical economists on non-market, political behavior goes back much earlier to figures such as John von Neumann and Oskar Morgenstern, Kenneth Arrow and his book Social Choice and Individual Values (1951), and Anthony Downs and his book An Economic Theory of Democracy (1957). Because of this and other formative work in rational choice, Downs is sometimes referred to as the "godfather" of formal theory. Riker relied on Downs as the intellectual foundation for his own work. Riker's book The Theory of Political Coalitions (1962) was the first original and fully developed application of rational choice theory and the principles of game theory made by a political scientist. Its publication had a significant impact on the contemporary profession of political science and prompted many scholars to consider the use of formal methods in their analyses, thus carving out a subfield in the discipline.

The birth and subsequent development of formal theory is associated with the Department of Political Science at the University of Rochester, where Riker wrote The Theory of Political Coalitions and where he served for 15 years as chair of the department. As chair, Riker set out to build a "program in Political Science that reflected his understanding of what a science of politics could be." He did this by adding to the department faculty and selecting graduate students whose methodological approach most closely mirrored his own. The development of formal theory under Riker at the University of Rochester was instrumental in sparking the behavioral revolution and new institutionalism movements in the discipline, and is therefore sometimes referred to as the Rochester school of political science. During his tenure at Rochester, Riker trained scores of graduate students, many of whom would go on to become professors at Ivy League universities, which in turn also became seedbeds for formal theory.

By the early 1990s, the application of rational choice in political science had grown significantly, with formal theory having a strong—if not dominant—hold on the political science academy in the United States. At this time, 40 percent of the articles published in the world's most prestigious political science journal, the American Political Science Review (APSR), used rational choice theory. By the end of the decade, the first undergraduate political science textbook that was based on formal theory was published.

== Criticism ==
The dominance and rapidly growing popularity of formal theory in the 1990s invited a range of criticisms from within the political science community. Most important in initiating this wave of pushback were Donald Green and Ian Shapiro, who together published their seminal work Pathologies of Rational Choice Theory (1996). In their book, Green and Shapiro argue that:

To date, a large proportion of the theoretical conjectures of rational choice theorists have not been tested empirically. Those tests that have been undertaken have either failed on their own terms or garnered theoretical support for propositions that, on reflection, can only be characterised as banal: they do little more than restate existing knowledge in rational choice terminology.

In October 2000 an anonymous correspondent who called himself "Mr Perestroika", widely believed to be a graduate student in political science, circulated a 'flame-mail' denouncing the subservience of the American Political Science Association (APSA) and its journal APSR to rational choice theory. The original email wrote:

Why are a few men who make poor game-theorists and who cannot for the life-of-me compete with a third grade Economics graduate student---WHY are these men allowed to represent the diversity of methodologies and areas of the world that APSA "purports" to represent?... If these pseudo-economists know their Maths so well--let them present at the University of Chicago's Economics Workshop--I assure you every single political science article will be trashed and thrown into the dustbin... We are in the business of Political Science and not failed Economics.

The email was quickly circulated around and gained traction, developing into the loose-knit Perestroika Movement in political science which sought to dislodge the privileged position of formal theory as the dominant methodological approach in American political science.

Although formal theory has continued to enjoy popularity within the American political science academy, even after the wave of critiques against its approach, it struggled to gain a foothold outside of the United States. Outside of a few schools in Britain, most notably the London School of Economics and the University of Essex, formal theory as an approach to political science never gained serious attention internationally.

== Journals ==
Formal theory scholarship is often published in the "big 3" journals in political science: American Political Science Review, American Journal of Political Science, and Journal of Politics. There are also several political science journals specifically focused on formal theoretic work. Because of the interdisciplinary nature of the subfield, formal theory articles also appear in economics journals.

- Economics & Politics
- Games and Economic Behavior
- Journal of Theoretical Politics
- Public Choice (journal)
- Quarterly Journal of Political Science

== See also ==
- Elite theory
- Iron law of oligarchy
- Public choice theory
- Rational choice theory
- Social choice theory
- Voting systems
- William H. Riker
