= Vian Bakir =

British journalism professor

Academic work
- Discipline: Communication
- Sub-discipline: Journalism, political communication specialist
- Institutions: Bangor University

Vian Bakir is a professor of journalism and political communication at Bangor University in Wales in the United Kingdom who researches political communication, propaganda and national security.

Bakir has explored the ethics of manipulation, particularly the line between acceptable persuasion and unethical influence, as well as the implications of digital manipulation.

In Bakir et al. (2019) she argues that persuasive communications, to avoid being manipulative, should be both informed (with sufficient information provided, and none of it deceptive) and freely chosen (namely, no coercion, such as threats, and no incentivisation, such as subsidies). In Bakir (2020), in the context of Cambridge Analytica's claims of psychographic profiling and targeting for political campaigning, she argues that manipulation of the digital media ecology becomes coercive (i.e. choice limiting) if it significantly modulates what information people are exposed to in order to preclude reflection or deliberation. In Briant and Bakir (2025), she provides the first comprehensive examination of the digital influence industry and how it operates worldwide. In particular, she collates the unethical potential of emerging technologies and new activities in digital influence that have become evident since the seminal case of the Cambridge Analytica and Facebook data harvesting scandal that unfolded across 2018–19.

Bakir has also conceptualised manipulation in the context of emotion profiling. In Bakir and McStay (2022), and Bakir and McStay (2018) she examines the rise of emotion profiling and targeting across social media and other forms of ‘emotional AI’ (i.e. AI that pertains to be able to read and respond to people's emotions), exploring its links with the rise of false information worldwide. For instance, the spread of fake news and false information on social media is algorithmically propelled by the strong emotions that such content arouses. As well as discussing how emotion profiling causes the spread of false information, she evaluates a range of solutions. She concludes that to protect against the rising tide of emotion profiling worldwide, it is necessary to take steps to protect people's mental integrity. In Bakir et al. (2024), in the context of UK adults’ views on emotional AI and emotion profiling, she finds that where emotion profiling is being used covertly to exploit users’ cognitive or affective weaknesses and vulnerabilities’, the British public want strong social protections from such applications of emotional AI. She suggests that given these concerns, regulators should not be timid in advancing a proactive and precautionary regulatory stance that would take priority over enabling innovation in AI.

Among her contributions on the relationship between political communication and contemporary agenda-building, Bakir defined Strategic Political Communication (SPC) as comprising 'political communication that is manipulative in intent, utilizes social scientific techniques and heuristic devices to understand human motivation, human behavior and the media environment in order to inform effectively what should be communicated – encompassing its detail and overall direction – and what should be withheld, with the aim of taking into account and influencing public opinion, and creating strategic alliances and an enabling environment for government policies – both at home and abroad'. Bakir (2010) argues that the era of web-based participatory media and convergence cultures, non-governmental and non-state actors, with their own virtual communities and networks that cut across national borders, use what she calls a 'sousveillant assemblage' to wield discursive power.

Bakir has also written on the subject of how to hold Intelligence elites publicly accountable, detailing many barriers and failures in how civil society does this, but issuing guidelines and retaining some practical optimism that this can be improved.

== Research ==
Bakir has written across four main areas of research:

1. Fake news, disinformation, propaganda and issues of trust in journalism;
2. Dataveillance, surveillance, sousveillance, emotional AI.
3. National and international agenda-building struggles conducted via the media;
4. The security state and public accountability.

Her research in these areas has influenced the discourse and understanding of political audiences across governments and legislatures (European, national); professional public/political communicators (global, UK, Wales); India's Supreme Court; journalists; NGOs; artists and the public.

In 2020 with Andrew McStay, Bakir submitted evidence to the UK Parliament on Electoral Campaigning Transparency.

== Major works ==
Bakir's books include:

- Briant E. & Bakir, V. (eds.) 2025. Routledge Handbook of the Influence Industry. New York: Routledge
- Bakir, V. and A. McStay, 2022. Optimising Emotions, Incubating Falsehoods. Palgrave-Macmillan/Springer.
- Bakir, V. 2018. Intelligence Elites and Public Accountability: Relationships of Influence with Civil Society. London: Routledge.
- Bakir, V. 2013. Torture, Intelligence and Sousveillance in the War on Terror: Agenda–Building Struggles.
- Bakir, V. 2010. Sousveillance, Media and Strategic Political Communication: Iraq, USA, UK. New York: Continuum.
- Bakir, V. & D.Barlow, (eds.) 2007. Communication in the Age of Suspicion: Trust and the Media. Basingstoke: Palgrave-Macmillan.
