= Maxwell McCombs =

American journalism studies scholar (1938–2024)

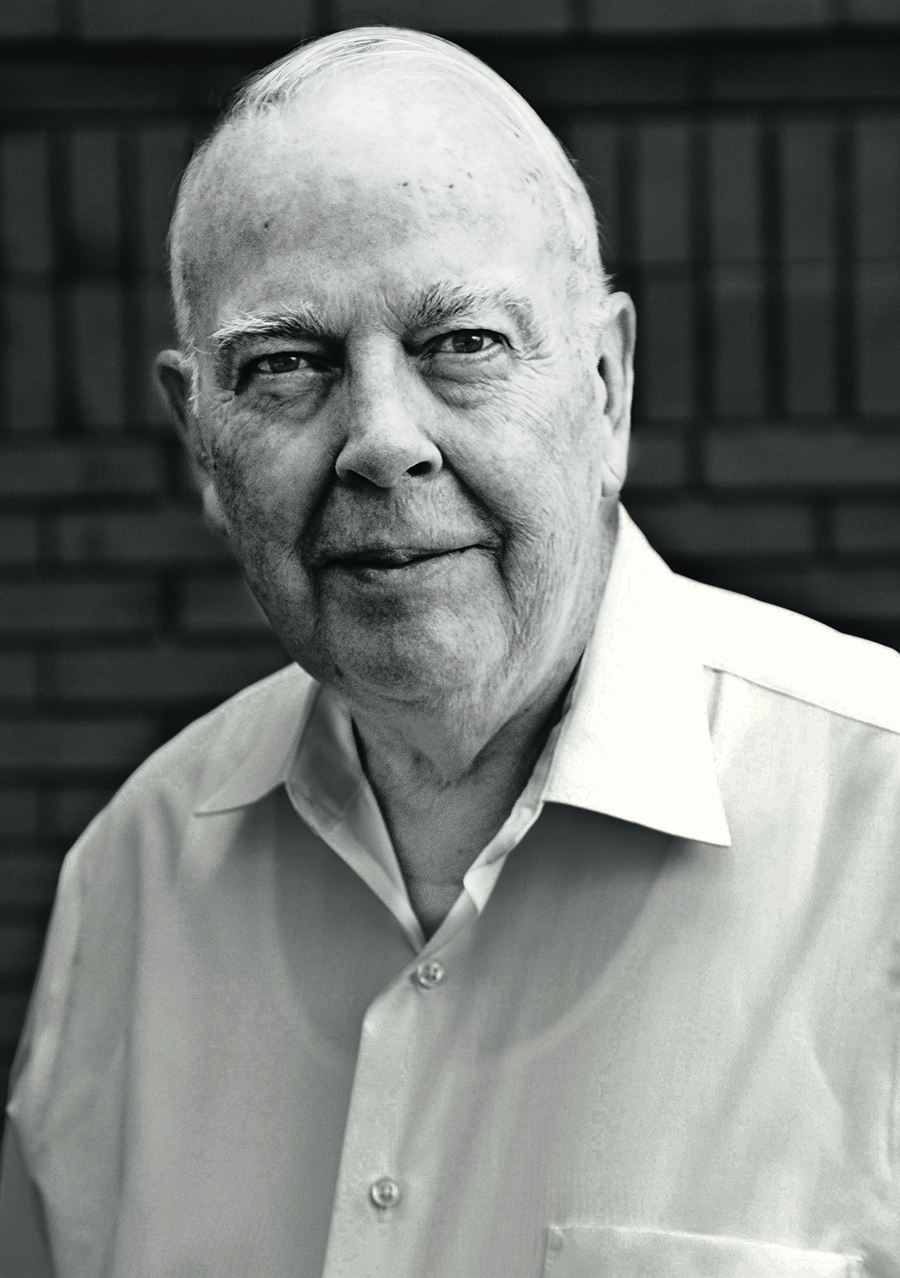
- Born: December 3, 1938; Birmingham, Alabama, U.S.
- Died: September 8, 2024 (aged 85); Austin, Texas, U.S.
- Education: Tulane University; Stanford University
- Known for: Agenda setting theory
- Awards: (with Donald Lewis Shaw) Helen Dinerman Award from the World Association for Public Opinion Research (2011)
- Scientific career
- Fields: Communication studies Journalism; Political communication
- Workplaces: University of North Carolina at Chapel Hill; Syracuse University; University of Texas at Austin
- Thesis: Role of Television in the Acquisition of Language (1966)
- Doctoral students: King Pu-tsung

Maxwell E. McCombs (December 3, 1938 – September 8, 2024) was an American journalism scholar known for his work on political communication. He was the Jesse H. Jones Centennial Chair in Communication Emeritus at the University of Texas at Austin. He is particularly known for developing the agenda setting theory of mass media with Donald Lewis Shaw.

In a 1972 paper, McCombs and Shaw described the results of a study they conducted testing the hypothesis that the news media have a large influence on the issues that the American public considers important. They conducted the study while they were both working at the University of North Carolina at Chapel Hill. The resulting paper, "The Agenda-Setting Function of Mass Media", has since been described as "a classic and perhaps the most cited article in the field of mass communication research in the past 35 years."

McCombs has been described as, along with Shaw, "one of the two founding fathers of empirical research on the agenda-setting function of the press."

== Background ==
McCombs was born to his father Max McCombs and his mother Gertrude McCombs on December 3, 1938, in Birmingham, Alabama. In terms of his socioeconomic background his father worked as a supervisor at an iron production plant and his mother was a registrar at a public school in Birmingham. He grew up in a traditional middle class home. McCombs died at the age of 85 in Austin, Texas on September 4, 2024.

== Honors, awards, and publications ==
McCombs and Shaw were jointly awarded the 2011 Helen Dinerman Award of the World Association for Public Opinion Research. In 2014, McCombs received the Silver Medal from the University of Navarra in Spain, where he has been a visiting professor from 1994. With Shaw, he has also received the Murray Edelman Award from the American Political Science Association.

An article by the University of Texas Moody College of Communication notes that: The concept of network agenda-setting is attributed to McCombs work in his later years. Network agenda-setting is the continuation of agenda-setting theory. This theory explores media networks and how they are broadcast to the public in terms of the issues they report on and the linkage from one issue to another. Net-works shy away from isolated topics. In McComb’s works he discusses “Organizing the extensive literature on agenda setting into six ongoing phases of research that detail the formation of public opinion, this book has been described as the Gray's Anatomy of agenda-setting theory.”
