= The Theory of Political Coalitions =

1962 book by William H. Riker

- Author: William H. Riker
- Subject: Political science
- Publisher: Yale University Press
- Publication date: 1962
- OCLC: 00325635

The Theory of Political Coalitions is an academic book on positive political theory written by the American political scientist William H. Riker and published in 1962. It uses game theory to formalize political theory. In it, Riker deduces the size principle. On its postulates, politicians are proved to form winning, minimal-size coalitions. The work runs contrary to a previous theory by Anthony Downs that they try to maximize their respective votes. Riker supposes that attracting more votes requires resources and that politicians run to win. A rational politician tries to form a coalition that is as large as necessary to win but not larger.

== Use of game theory ==
Out of the varied models of game theory, Riker asserts that those involving the number of players are the most in understanding society [incomplete: the most ___ ?]. In particular, Riker bases his primary examination and discussion of game theory to zero-sum situations involving three-or-more-person games (more easily known as n-player or, as Riker calls it, n-person games). He justifies this on the grounds that in n-person games the main activity of the players is to select not only strategies, but partners. Compared to one or two person games where maximum gain is the only thing sought, n-person games involve the potential for parallelism of interests. Conflict does exist, especially when the game is zero-sum, but there is now also an additional possibility for alliance and collusion.

Riker points to two main concepts devised by John Von Neumann and Oscar Morgenstern as being an important limit on the potential coalitions in a n-person game. These are the characteristic function and the imputation concept. The characteristic function is the statement of the total payment to each coalition possible in the game. Riker points to it as significant as, when comparing the lists of payments to potential coalitions, the least profitable coalitions will not be considered by players. The imputation concept refers to the specific list of payments to each player in a given structure of coalitions. The key thing Riker points out for this concept is that while there is generally a very large number of possible coalitions, only some of these possibilities will be considered by players due to some being more advantageous for the coalition members than others. The importance of this, Riker says, is that, "if one can put limitations on the ... imputations that will be seriously considered by the players, then one also puts limitations on the process of coalition making- inasmuch as imputations are related to particular partitions into coalitions."

== Size principle and minimal size coalitions ==
In his book Riker uses some notions from game theory to derive a fundamental principle concerning the size of coalitions. Specifically, he derived the following statement from the notions examined. "In n-person, zero sum games, where side-payments are permitted, where players are rational, and where they have perfect information, only minimum winning coalitions occur." Riker builds on this to form a descriptive statement, or sociological law as he puts it, about the natural world which embodies his size principle. He states this as, "in social situations similar to n-person, zero-sum games with side-payments, participants create coalitions just as large as they believe will ensure winning and no larger."

In a five-party system, if, after a general election, this representation is given:

	Party A	Party B	Party C	Party D	Party E	
Number of representatives	5	40	26	25	4	Sum: 100

Three winning coalitions are possible:

Party B and C	Party B and D	Party C and D
40+26=66 representatives	40+25=65 representatives	26+25=51 representatives

If it is now presumed that power will be divided according to strength within the coalition, the parties will prefer the largest relative size within the coalition. The result is that the coalition with C and D is the winning coalition. The largest party is thus kept from power.

== Criticism ==
In his article, "On the Size of Winning Coalitions," Harvard University Professor Kenneth Shepsle asserted that "minimum winning coalitions constitute unstable equilibrium points in n-person zero-sum games". This point extends analysis from Robert Butterworth's critique of Riker's size principle. Shepsle's critique is that while "there appear to be forces in the coalition formation process that drive winning coalitions toward minimal size," these forces are unable to keep the coalitions minimal. Shepsle argues that if "the usual assumptions about n-person zero-sum coalition processes are supplemented with assumptions about coalition intentions and capabilities, there are good reasons to expect minimum winning coalitions in all but the most extreme instances."

More general criticism of Riker's size principle has been based on the vagueness of its predictive ability, especially when information is not perfect. Eric Browne, in his article, "Testing Theories of Coalition Formation in the European Context," argues this point. He says that it can be demonstrated that no uniquely favoured proto-coalition (a player who, when in a coalition, makes said coalition more valuable than any other) is produced by the size principle. He therefore argues that Riker's theory results in a position of not being able to make a definitive prediction. He expresses this further by saying. "All we may state is that, of the four possible winning coalitions, one of the three two-party coalitions will form." Additionally, Browne points to the knowledge aspect of Riker's theory as posing a problem. He argues that while the context of governing coalitions "minimizes the problem of perfect information" (meaning that parties know how possible coalitions will benefit them), leaders may not be able to "depend on their parties to vote with perfect cohesion. If they have reason to expect that they will not, we might then expect that greater than minimal winning coalitions will form."

Other criticisms of the size principle have been directed at the validity of its proof and the assumption "that politicians are primarily driven by the intrinsic benefits of office and that they will coalesce with any party out of expediency."
