= Donald Lewis Shaw =

American social scientist (1936–2021)

Donald L. Shaw
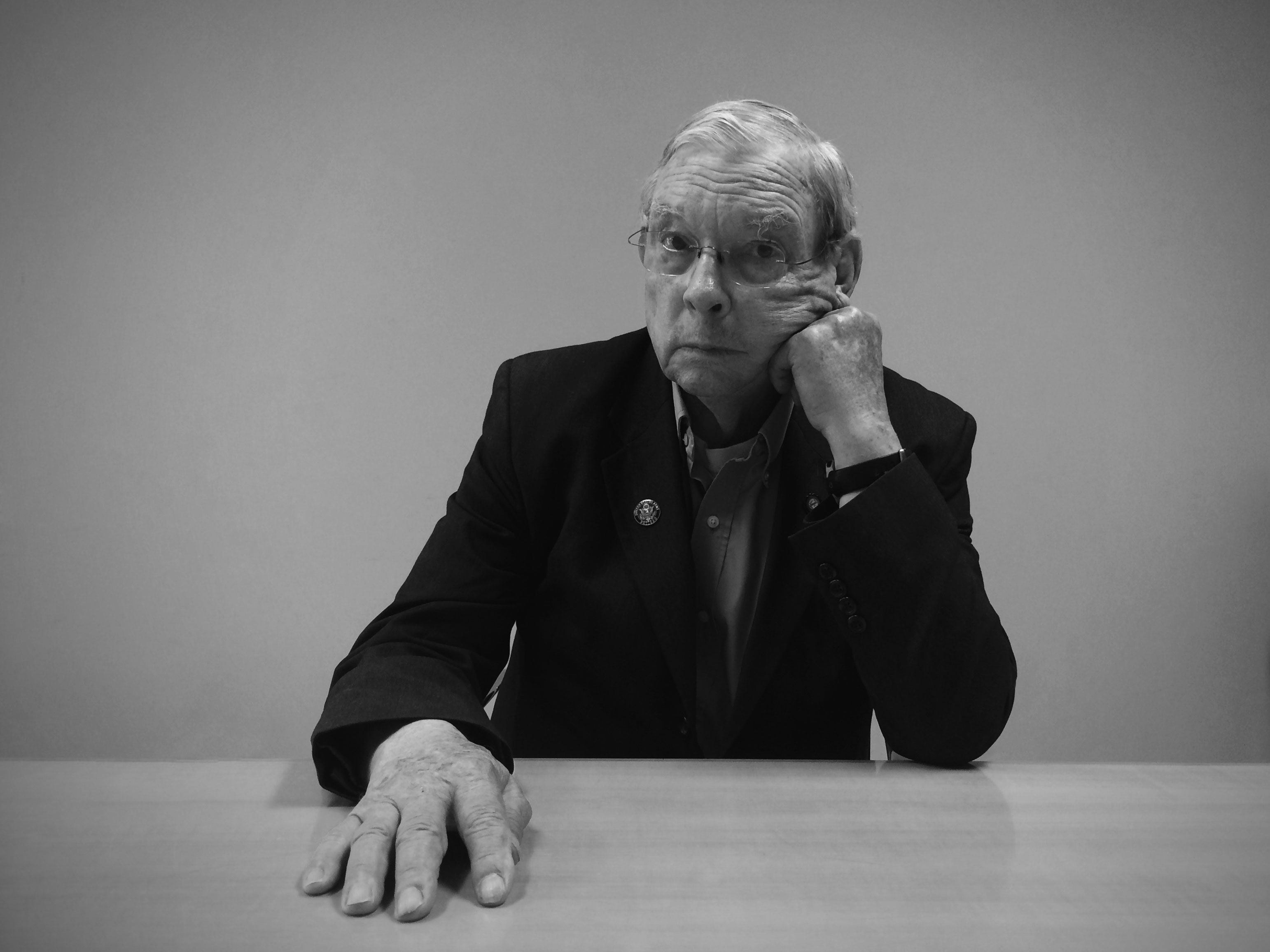
- Shaw in 2015
- Born: October 27, 1936; Raleigh, North Carolina
- Died: October 19, 2021 (aged 84)
- Education: University of North Carolina-Chapel Hill, University of Wisconsin-Madison
- Occupation: Social Scientist
- Years active: 1967-2021
- Known for: Agenda Setting
- Notable work: The Emergence of American Political Issues: The Agenda-Setting Function of the Press

Donald Lewis Shaw (October 27, 1936 – October 19, 2021), one of the two founding fathers of empirical research on the agenda-setting function of the press, was a social scientist and a Kenan professor emeritus at the University of North Carolina at Chapel Hill. He was born to Luther and Lowell Shaw on October 27, 1936, in Raleigh, North Carolina.

Shaw, a retired U.S. Army officer, held a Ph.D. in journalism from the University of Wisconsin and an M.A. and B.A. in journalism from the University of North Carolina at Chapel Hill. Shaw worked for nearly three years as a daily newspaper reporter. As an Army officer, he was the graduate of five major military schools including the U.S. Army War College and the U.S. Naval War college. He also was a visiting professor at seven universities and lectured at more than 20 universities in the United States, Europe, the Middle East, and Asia.

Shaw is best known for his work, with Maxwell McCombs of the University of Texas, on the agenda-setting theory and for his studies of 19th and 20th century American and Southern press history. Shaw began work on the agenda-setting theory in 1966 and was joined by McCombs in 1967, when McCombs came to UNC as a junior professor. During the 1968 presidential election, Shaw and McCombs collected survey data from a random group of Chapel Hill residents. McCombs and Shaw demonstrated that audiences often judge the importance of a news item based on how frequently and prominently it is covered by the media, thus indicating the degree to which the media shapes public opinion. McCombs and Shaw's seminal article, The Agenda-Setting Function of Mass Media, is arguably the most-cited article in the field of mass communication research.

In 1977, Shaw and McCombs published The Emergence of American Political Issues: The Agenda-Setting Function of the Press, which the Journalism and Mass Communication Quarterly listed as one of the top 35 "significant journalism and communication books" of the 20th century. In 1999, Shaw and his colleagues published the first study of audience agendamelding, the process by which individuals mix messages to create personal images of community. Since then, Shaw and his colleagues have published several agendamelding articles. He is the author, or co-author, of 18 books as well as nearly 70 scholarly articles and approximately 50 scholarly book reviews. In 2012, Shaw was inducted into the North Carolina Journalism Hall of Fame.

== Select publications ==
- Handbook of Reporting Methods (1976)
- The Emergence of American Political Issues: The Agenda-Setting Function of the Press (1977)
- Foreign News and the New World Information Order (1984)
- The Rise and Fall of American Mass Media: Roles of Technology and Leadership (1991)
- Advanced Reporting: Discovering Patterns in News Events (1996)
- Communication and Democracy: Exploring the intellectual Frontiers in Agenda-setting theory (1997)
- Dancing with Emily (2012)
- Content is King: News Media Management in the Digital Age (2015)
- Agendamelding: News, Social Media, Audiences, and Civic Community (2019)

== See also ==
Agenda-Setting Theory
