= Kenneth Shepsle =

American political scientist

- Born: September 10, 1945 (age 81)
- Citizenship: United States

Academic background
- Education: University of Rochester; University of North Carolina at Chapel Hill
- Thesis: Essays on risky choice in electoral competition (1970)

Academic work
- Discipline: Political science
- School or tradition: Rochester school
- Institutions: Harvard University; Washington University in St. Louis

Kenneth Shepsle (born September 10, 1945) is an American political scientist who is influential for rational choice scholarship. He is George D. Markham professor of government at Harvard University, and a research associate at the Institute for Quantitative Social Science there. He is a fellow of the American Academy of Arts and Sciences and of the National Academy of Sciences.

As an undergraduate, he majored in mathematics at the University of North Carolina at Chapel Hill. His doctorate is from University of Rochester.
