= Political communication =

Field of study

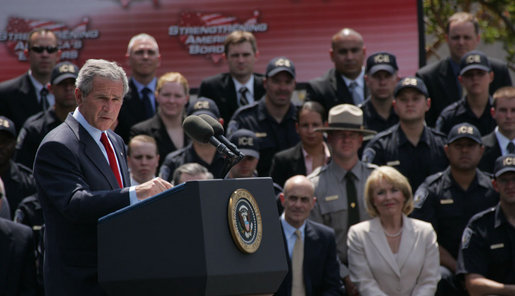
President George W. Bush giving a speech on immigration in Glynco, Georgia.

Political communication is the practice or study of political messaging, e.g. in political campaigns, speeches and political advertising, often within the mass media. As an interdisciplinary subfield it is located between communication studies and political science. Political communication is concerned with ideas such as information flow, political influence, policy making, news, and public opinion. The subfield also focuses on the study of political social media, propaganda, political economy of communication and non-profit organisations that communicate to affect political processes. Modern societal changes that have affected the subfield include the digitization of media, polarization and a movement towards a post-truth media environment.

== History ==
=== Ancient History ===
Political communication has existed since antiquity. During this era it was common for rulers to use symbols and monuments to communicate power and authority to the masses. In ancient Greece, public speeches such as those delivered by Pericles in Athens, played a crucial role in shaping political discourse and rallying public support for war efforts.

During the era of the Roman Empire, political communication took on a more sophisticated form with the use of propaganda, rhetoric, and public spectacles in order to try and influence public opinion. Figures famed for their political communication skills include Cicero.

=== Modern era ===
After the creation of the print media with the dawn of the modern printing press in modern industrial Britain, this led to the ability to create modern mass media in the 20th century, which transformed political communication, giving rise to new forms of propaganda, advertising, and public relations. Political leaders such as Winston Churchill and Franklin. D. Roosevelt utilized radio broadcasts to reach millions of listeners during times of crisis and war. Edward S. Herman notes that the expensive nature of the printing press meant that early on in the technology's existence, labour and co-operative organisations were easily priced out of the press media market due to capital constraints, meaning that corporations obtained an early grip on the market. Herman therefore argues that this meant early on in the mass media of Britain, corporate right-wing voices would self-select editors to run their newspapers, stopping organised working class and left-wing voices from participating in the mass media market.

=== The age of spin ===
During the 1990s and the early 2000s political spin had become common place as a form of political communication, with these political communicators known as spin doctors . For example governments like Tony Blair's in The United Kingdom and George W. Bush were known for this. Tony Blair's Press Secretary Alistair Campbell, who was previously a journalist, had the job of spinning bad situations that showed the British government in a bad light, by using press briefings with the British media. Campbell became an influential and controversial addition to the political communication toolkit of Tony Blair's Labour government in the United Kingdom. This practice became standard in subsequent governments in Western countries like the United Kingdom and the United States, with dedicated 'briefing rooms' whereby members of government address and communicate with the countries' press, which have came to be known as spin rooms.

=== Digital media ===
Today, due to the diversification of media during the digital age, political communication now also includes online platforms like social media, free online news channels on services like YouTube, X (previously Twitter), Meta platforms and online News Websites. This has changed how the public and voters receive their political news and information. For example Barack Obama's presidential campaigns in 2008 and 2012 are notable for mobilizing supporters, as they helped innovate the use of social media to engage voters and raise funds. Volodymyr Zelenskyy's successful 2019 Presidential Campaign also featured heavy usage of social media posts.

Today, Political communication continues to evolve quickly, as new technologies such as AI and big data analytics have begun to reshape how campaigns can target and persuade voters. However, this has led to large concerns regarding misinformation, echo chambers, and online polarization. Recent election manipulation events like the Facebook-Cambridge Analytica scandal have now become an issue. The company was found to have assisted Donald Trump's election campaign by unethically mining user's Facebook data, exemplifying increased levels of distrust of corporate and political institutions by the public.

== Political communication actors ==
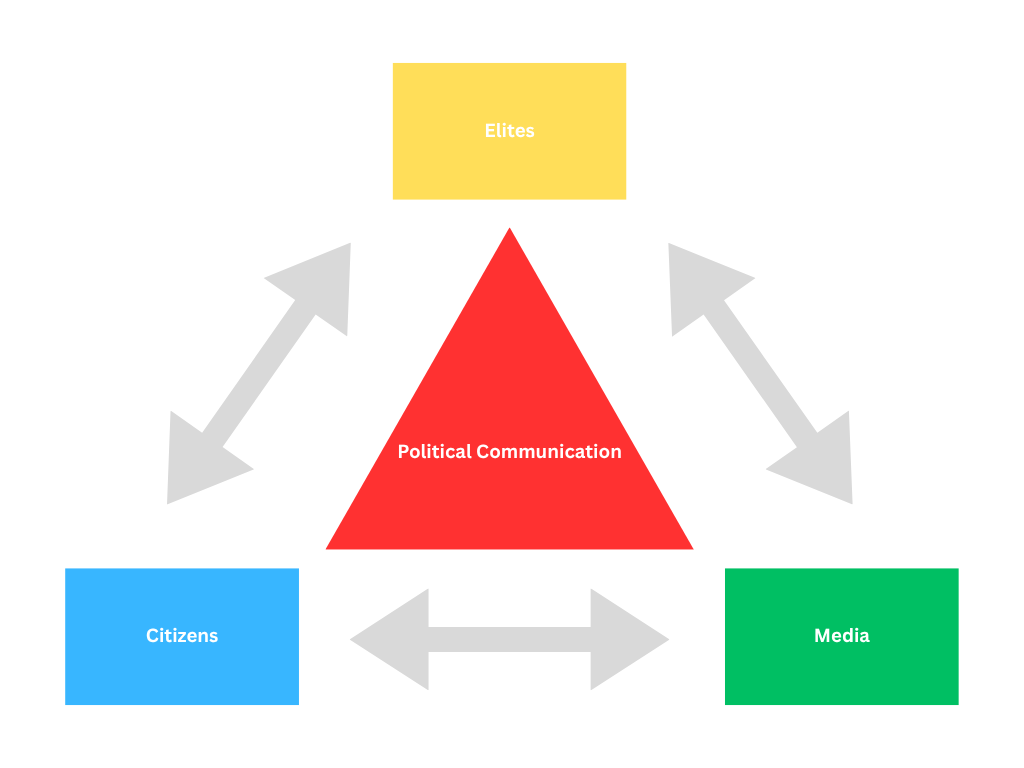
A triangular diagram showing interactions between elites, media and citizens in the political communication process.

There are several actors that can participate in political communication. John Zaller states that there are three key actors within the political communication public environment that compete with each other to obtain their own goals: citizens, journalists (via the news media) and politicians. Specifically Zaller states that there are three key tensions: between the journalists and citizens whereby journalists want to produce news that is too sophisticated for citizens, between politicians and journalists whereby both actors want to control the content of the news, and politicians and the citizens whereby citizens want accountable politicians and politicians may want to dodge that responsibility.

=== Journalists as actors ===
Later Dumdum and Bankston returned to Zaller's macro assertions concerning actors in the political communication process, considering new research concerning how they interact. Media effects can occur between actors like citizens and politicians. Dumdum and Bankston state that empirical research has explored these media effects, showing evidence for agenda-setting, issue framing and priming of citizens. On the other hand they state that journalists (via the news media) can have an effect on political elites by helping to influence which issues they view as important and the strategies such elites must follow, also known as media logic.

=== Political elites as actors ===
Dumdum and Bankston continue stating that empirical research has shown that political elite communications also can have measurable effects on the public e.g. agenda-setting, issue framing and priming. The researchers argue that elites "-connect events and issues to a larger political environment and structure how the public evaluate them and other political phenomena." Further they argue that the media experiences effects from political elites concerning "what to cover and how to cover it."

=== Citizens as actors ===
Lastly, citizens are key within a political communication environment. Dumdum and Bankston argue that they are "the principal actor in traditional democratic theory, and elites are responsive to public opinion, at least on the [public opinion] aggregate, even if the process is mediated through news media." On the other hand the public also affects what and how media covers concerning political phenomena, via public attention on a specific issue. This therefore can have an agenda-setting effect on the media at that time.

== Political messaging ==
Robert E. Denton and Gary C. Woodward, define political communication as concerning the modes and intentions of message senders when attempting to influence the political environment. This includes public discussion (e.g. political speeches, news media coverage, and ordinary citizens' talk) that considers who has authority to sanction the allocation of public resources, who has authority to make decisions, as well as social meaning like what makes someone American.

"...the crucial factor that makes communication 'political' is not the source of a message, but its content and purpose."

== Rhetoric ==
Political communication has long used political persuasion, which is a key subfield for rhetoric studies. Political figures understand the role of the media in gaining the acceptance of voters. For example, political communication delivered through social media tends to be accompanied by social interaction and public opinion.

In political communication, rhetorical strategies such as logos, ethos, and pathos are commonly used to persuade audiences. Techniques include metaphors, narratives, and strategic discourse. These contribute to shaping public perception and opinion. These rhetorical techniques contribute to framing, a process that determines how political issues are presented and understood. Through generic framing in the media, political rhetoric can emphasize conflict (contestation), political competition (strategic-game/horse-race), personal stories(human interest), economic consequences, or moral justifications. These choices shape how the public interprets political events and policies, reinforcing certain viewpoints while downplaying others.

== Strategic political communication ==
Strategic communications concern organisational and group communications designed to further their goals. David L. Swanson and Dan Nimmo define political communication in relation to strategic communications as "the strategic use of communication to influence public knowledge, beliefs, and action on political matters." They emphasize this strategic nature of political communication by highlighting the role of persuasion in political discourse. Brian McNair provides a similar definition when he writes that political communication is "purposeful communication about politics." For Brian McNair, this means that this not only covers verbal or written statements, but also visual representations such as dress attire, make-up, hairstyle or logo design. In other words, it also includes all those aspects that develop a 'political identity' or 'image'. According to Harald Borgebund, the author of Political Communication and the Realities of Democracy, "Political communication is essential in a democratic polity."

In terms of political communication and its relationship to modern agenda building, Vian Bakir defines strategic political communication as comprising "political communication that is manipulative in intent, utilizes social scientific techniques and heuristic devices to understand human motivation, human behavior and the media environment in order to inform effectively what should be communicated – encompassing its detail and overall direction – and what should be withheld, with the aim of taking into account and influencing public opinion, and creating strategic alliances and an enabling environment for government policies – both at home and abroad."

To further expand on why political communication can be viewed as manipulative, Michael Gurevitch and Jay G. Blumler state that "the very structure of political communication involves a division between movers and shakers at the top and bystanders below." Public access television has been one way in which political communication has been combated. Dr. Laura Stein states that "public access [television] has opened up a space for grassroots political communication on television"

=== Abu Ghraib ===
In regards to the Political Strategic Communication in The USA one example is the Bush Administration's torture-for-intelligence policy, initiated after 9/11, which was kept secret for several years. While this secret policy was gradually revealed from 2004 onwards, revealed by the Abu Ghraib torture photos, the Bush administration engaged in strategic political communication to attempt to publicly re-frame and protect its policies. Strategic political communication during the event included both silencing and persuasive discursive activity.

Discursive activity aimed at silencing consisted of plea bargains, censoring Guantánamo detainees' descriptions of their own torture in pre–trial hearings, deals with journalists to censor or withhold information that affected national security, weeding out personal sousveillance of torture online, and suppression of visual sousveillance of torture while court–martials and criminal investigations proceeded. Destruction of videotapes of CIA interrogations and withholding key information from intelligence oversight committees also occurred. Those that were complicit aimed at suppressing this information to minimize public interest and discussion.

Persuasive discursive activity included the propagation and repetition of key messages consistently over time, with the aim of misdirecting public attention from the silence–generating activities. Key Bush Administration messages included: that detainees were evil and dangerous terrorists, that the practice of extraordinary rendition was normal and pragmatic, that interrogation techniques, although were legal, that they were necessary and successful in preventing future acts of terror, and that Guantánamo was a model prison. Key British administration messages initially indicated igonorance of the American intelligence agencies' new strategies, after which intelligence agencies' guidelines were tightened, and then indicated that no direct involvement of British intelligence agencies were involved in extraordinary rendition. Key messages common to both the British and American Administrations were that the Abu Ghraib sousveillance and similar visual evidence involving British soldiers were examples of isolated abuse rather than a torture policy. This being indicated from changes to Army training and interrogation guidance under both the Bush and Blair Administrations. These messages were propagated through a range of discursive activities (including press conferences and media interviews, authorized leaks, real–time reporting, official investigations and public inquiries) and were periodically bolstered by selective public release of once–secret documents. The consistency of key messages over time, together with the offering up of specific evidence, gives the appearance of official disclosure and truth–telling, positioning the public as a force to which political administrations willingly hold themselves accountable.

=== The United Nations ===
According to Jake Sherman and Albert Trithart, "United Nations peace operations often struggle to communicate their messages to the local population and the broader global community." It argued, therefore, that "the outdated public information approach of the United Nations must be transformed into more dynamic communications efforts.", "This required missions to better understand key audiences, make better use of national staff, embrace technology, train leaders in effective communication, proactively engage with local populations, and tailor both the message and means of communication to particular audiences."

=== The Middle East ===
Kai Hafez states that when discussing the Middle East concerning projects like e-projects "supported by a U.S. administration, are at best visionary and without any real practical use". Concerning censorship, Hussein Amin states that "-because many people view censorship as a sign of social responsibility, civil society has a deep distrust of itself. While admitting that political communication in the mass media has diversified and developed some more liberal patterns in recent years". Further when it comes to national identities Nisbet et al., state that "Mass media have long been linked to the historical development and emergence of national identities and the modern nation-state by creating bounded spaces of political communication and discourse".

In cases like the on-going conflict like in Syria, the majority of media formats are censored towards the Middle East in order to avoid further catastrophization of an event, possibly by the West. For example, in Syria, the Rebel Free Syrian Army was created as an opposition to Bashar al-Assad's dictatorship.

== Political economy of communications ==
=== The Propaganda Model ===
During a political economy analysis of the U.S. corporate news media, Edward S. Herman and Noam Chomsky developed a model during the 1980s called the propaganda model. It theorized that the interests of globalized elites in the US were warping the journalistic integrity of the mass media and its attempts to communicate news, to critique modern Western communications. They suggest that the political consent of the electorate would also be damaged by this type of politicized news in the mass media:

"The more elusive or imaginary the foe, the better for manufacturing consent. The picture of the world that's presented to the public has only the remotest relation to reality."

In terms of political communication, the propaganda model is generally used in the context of the globalized American corporate media and how it organically acts in the interests of corporate elites, specifically in an anti-democratic way. Therefore, Herman and Chomsky argue that the interests of the corporate elites are not overly concerned with the democratic rights of citizens and that this creates a new form of propaganda, which has damaging effects on democracies like the United States Government.

== Role of social media ==
Social media has become an increasingly important tool for political communication. For certain demographics it is one of the main platforms from which individuals acquire their news, and allows them to interact with it via commenting and sharing. Social media has dramatically changed the way in which modern political campaigns are run. With more digital native citizens coming into the voting population, social media has become an important medium where politicians can establish themselves and engage with voters. In an increasingly digitized world, new research has shown that social media is becoming increasingly important in electoral politics.

Social media experience relies heavily on the user themselves due to the platforms' algorithms which tailor consumer experience for each user. This results in each person seeing more like-minded news due to the increase in digital social behavior. Additionally, social media has changed politics because it has given politicians a direct medium to give their constituents information and the people to speak directly to the politicians. This informal nature can lead to informational mistakes because it is not being subjected to the same "fact-checking processes as institutional journalism." Initially, this immediacy was celebrated for enabling more authentic, "intimate" ties between politicians and the public, raising hopes that digital technologies would strengthen democratic engagement. Nevertheless, as the hype cycle of political communication demonstrates, such optimism has repeatedly given way to pessimism. Enthusiasm over direct access has been tempered by recognition of risks, including weakened fact-checking, the spread of misinformation, and the partisan manipulation of digital platforms

Social media creates greater opportunity for political persuasion due to the high number of citizens that regularly engage and build followings on social media. The more that a person engages on social media, the more influential they believe themselves to be, resulting in more people considering themselves to be politically persuasive.

== See also ==
- Open government
- Propaganda
- Politainment
- Issue tracking systems in governmental services
- Intelligence cycle
- List of basic political science topics
- Government operations
- Media populism
- Political campaign
- Political Communication (journal)
- Rhetoric
- Technological nationalism
- Torture
- Sousveillance
- Social media
- Agenda-setting
- Aestheticization
- Agenda-setting
- Professionalization
- Dealignment
- Dumbing down
- Framing
- Globalization
- Hegemony
- Manufactured consent
- Populism
- Pseudo-events
- Democracy
- Political media
- Political party
- Public relations
- Pressure groups
- Publicity
- Globalization
