= Rochester school =

The Rochester school was an influential movement in the Political Science Department at the University of Rochester. Among its key figures were William H. Riker and Kenneth Shepsle, who popularised the study of public choice following a large donation from Xerox, a company based in the same city as the university. It preceded and was essential to the behavioral revolution in political science, and is now considered broadly in the mainstream of political methodology.
