= Agenda-setting theory =

Ability of the mass media to influence the public agenda of a society

Agenda-setting theory suggests that the communications media, through their ability to identify and publicize issues, play a pivotal role in shaping the problems that attract attention from governments and international organizations, and direct public opinion towards specific issues. The theory suggests that the politician and journalists can shape public opinion through media by determining what issues are given the most attention, and has been widely studied and applied to various forms of media. The way news stories and topics that impact public opinion are presented is influenced by the media. It is predicated on the idea that most individuals only have access to one source of information on most issues: the news media. Since they establish the agenda, they may affect how important some things are seen to be.

The agenda-setting by media is driven by the media's bias on things such as politics, economy and culture, etc. Audiences consider an issue to be more significant the more media attention it receives (media issue saliency). For instance, even if readers do not have strong feelings about immigration, they might believe that it is a pressing problem at the time if there is consistent journalistic coverage of it over the period of a few months.

The theory has two core assumptions. The first is that it is the media that controls the reality. The media does not report the reality but instead filters and shapes it. The second assumption is that it is the media that gives importance or saliency to its topics as the more likely the media focuses on certain issues, the more likely the public perceive such issue as important and therefore demands action.

The agenda-setting theory can be reflected in the awareness model, priorities model, and salience model. The media's agenda-setting influences public agenda which in turn influences policy agenda building. There have been three theorized levels for agenda-setting theory that have developed over time: first-level, second-level, and third-level.

Gatekeeping: In order to explain how agenda setting functions in the real world it is important to focus on the concept of gatekeeping. Before issues are released to the public and gain traction they must be approved through the editorial decision-making process. The role of an editor can vary but often the "editors are the main gatekeepers of media itself. The news media decides 'what' events to broadcast and show through the media 'gates' on the basis of 'newsworthiness'". This process describes when media professionals who work for news organizations decide which issues will receive the most attention and how much traction as well as which perspectives are included and excluded from the coverage. Gatekeeping is what shapes the media from the very begging and influence issues that become the most accessible to the public.

== Process ==
Agenda-setting occurs through a cognitive process known as "accessibility". Accessibility implies that the frequency and prominence of news media coverage significantly influences the accessibility of specific issues within the audience's memory. When respondents are asked what the most important problem facing the country is, they answer with the most accessible news issue in memory, which is typically the issue the news media focused on the most. The agenda-setting effect does not stem from just one or a few messages but instead is due to the collective impact of a very large number of messages, each of which has different content but all of which target the same general issue.

== History ==
Agenda-setting theory was formally developed by Maxwell McCombs and Donald Lewis Shaw in a study on the 1968 US presidential election, "the Chapel Hill study". McCombs and Shaw demonstrated a strong correlation between one hundred Chapel Hill residents' thought on what was the most important election issue and what the local news media reported was the most important issue. By comparing the salience of issues in news content with the public's perceptions, McCombs and Shaw determined the degree to which the media sways public opinion. The theory also suggests that media has a great influence to their audience by instilling what they should think about, instead of what they actually think. That is, if a news item is covered frequently and prominently, the audience will regard the issue as more important.

Donald L. Shaws and Maxwell E. McCombs noted in their 1972 Chapel Hill study that researchers compared voters’ perceptions of the most relevant campaign issues with an analysis on magazines, newspapers and television reports in order to measure the level of attention each media outlet received.

In conclusion McCombs and Shaw found a strong tie between the issues that voters claimed to be most important and the issues that were presented by the media. This suggested that coverage influenced the perceived importance of the political topics distributed by the media.

=== Early research ===
The history of study of agenda-setting can be traced to the first chapter of Walter Lippmann's 1922 book, Public Opinion. In that chapter, "The World Outside and the Pictures In Our Heads", Lippmann argues that the mass media are the principal connection between events in the world and the images in the minds of the public. Without using the term "agenda-setting", Walter Lippmann was writing about what we today would call "agenda-setting". According to Lippmann, the public responds not to actual events in the environment but to the pseudo-environment, which is a term referring to "the pictures in our heads."

"For the real environment is altogether too big, too complex, and too fleeing for direct acquaintance. We are not equipped to deal with so much subtlety, so much variety, so many permutations and combinations. And although we have to act in that environment, we have to reconstruct it on a simpler model before we can manage with it." The media step in and essentially set the agenda, offering simpler models by which people can make sense of the world.

Following Lippmann's 1922 book, Bernard Cohen observed (in 1963) that the press "may not be successful much of the time in telling people what to think, but it is stunningly successful in telling its readers what to think about. The world will look different to different people," Cohen continues, "depending on the map that is drawn for them by writers, editors, and publishers of the paper they read."

As early as the 1960s, Cohen had expressed the idea that later led to formalization of agenda-setting theory by McCombs and Shaw. The stories with the strongest agenda setting influence tend to be those that involve conflict, terrorism, crime and drug issues within the United States. Those that do not include or involve the United States and politics associate negatively with public opinion.

Although Maxwell McCombs already had some interest in the field, he was exposed to Cohen's work while serving as a faculty member at UCLA, and it was Cohen's work that heavily influenced him, and later Donald Shaw. The concept of agenda setting was launched by McCombs and Shaw during the 1968 presidential election in Chapel Hill, North Carolina. They examined Lippmann's idea of construction of the pictures in our heads by comparing the issues on the media agenda with key issues on the undecided voters' agenda. They found evidence of agenda setting by identifying that salience of the news agenda is highly correlated to that of the voters' agenda. McCombs and Shaw were the first to provide the field of communication with empirical evidence that demonstrated the power of mass media and its influence on the public agenda. The empirical evidence also earned this theory its credibility amongst other social scientific theories.

G. Ray Funkhouser performed a study highly similar to McCombs and Shaw's around the same time the authors were formalizing the theory. McCombs, Shaw, and Funkhouser presented their findings at the same academic conference. Funkhouser's article was published later than McCombs and Shaw's, and Funkhouser does not receive as much credit as McCombs and Shaw for discovering agenda setting. According to Everett Rogers, there are two main reasons for this. First, Funkhouser did not formally name the theory. Second, Funkhouser did not pursue his research much past the initial article. Rogers also suggests that Funkhouser was geographically isolated at Stanford, cut off from interested researchers, whereas McCombs and Shaw had got other people interested in agenda-setting research.

=== Development ===
By comparing and developing the salience of issues in news content with the public's perceptions of the most important election issue, McCombs and Shaw were able to determine the degree to which the media determines public opinion. Since the 1968 "Chapel Hill" study, published in a 1972 edition of Public Opinion Quarterly, more than 400 studies have been published on the agenda-setting function of the mass media, and the theory continues to be regarded as relevant.

== Three models of agenda-setting ==
Three models describe the agenda-setting process:

1. Awareness mode
2. Priorities model
3. Salience model

The research on the effect of agenda-setting compares the salience of issues in news content with the public perceptions of the most important issue. Then it analyses the extent of influence by guidance of the media. There are three models proposed by Max McCombs: the awareness model, the priorities model and the salience model. Most investigations are centered on these three models.

=== Awareness model ===
The awareness model proposes that an issue is on an individual's agenda because they have seen it in the media. If the media does not report on an issue or topic, then it will most likely not be thought about by an individual. For example, if the media reports on Topic X, an individual is more likely to be aware of Topic X over Topic Y.

=== Priorities model ===
The priorities model explicitly describes where priorities lie. The issues the media prioritizes will likely be prioritized by individuals as well. For example, if the media reports on Topic X, an individual will care about Topic X and its updates (even if Topic Y is more pressing, it is not being reported on).

=== Salience model ===
The salience model lies somewhere in between the awareness model and the priorities model. In this model, individuals' agendas do not exactly reflect the media's agendas. However, some issues or topics that are consistently presented in the media will appear at the top of individuals' agendas. For example, if the media reports on Topic X, an individual will care about Topic X to a lesser extent than the media cares.

Most research on agenda-setting are based on the following:

1. the press and the media do not reflect reality; they filter and shape it;
2. media concentration on a few issues and subjects leads the public to perceive those issues as more important than other issues.

== Three types of agenda-setting: Policy-makers, media and audience ==
Research shows that the media agenda, audience agenda and policy agenda influence the agenda setting as described in the following section. Rogers and Dearing describe how following types of agenda setting (dependent variable in research) are influenced by other factors:

1. "Policy agenda-setting" or "Political agenda setting"
2. "Media agenda-setting" or "Agenda building"
3. "Public/Audience agenda-setting"

Studies have shown that what the media decides to expose correlates with their views on things such as politics, economy and culture. Aside from bias, other critics of the news media claim that news in the United States has become a form of entertainment. Instead of providing the public with the information they need, journalists instead strive to fill the publics' appetite for shocking and sensational headlines. Countries that tend to have more political power are more likely to receive media exposure. Financial resources, technologies, foreign trade and money spent on the military can be some of the main factors that explain coverage inequality.

Mass communication research, Rogers and Dearing argue, has focused a great deal on public agenda setting (e.g. McCombs and Shaw, 1972) and media agenda setting, but has largely ignored policy agenda setting, which is studied primarily by political scientists. As such, the authors suggest mass communication scholars pay more attention to how the media and public agendas might influence elite policy makers' agendas (i.e. scholars should ask where the President or members of the U.S. Congress get their news from and how this affects their policies). Writing in 2006, Walgrave and Van Aelst took up Rogers and Dearing's suggestions, creating a preliminary theory of political agenda setting, which examines factors that might influence elite policy makers' agendas.

Three steps of the agenda-setting theory influence how the media presents information to the public and how the media tells the public what to think about. Once the media tells the public what to think about, the more policy is enacted.

=== Media agenda ===
The media agenda refers to the most important consideration of discussed issues in negotiated sources. The result of this agenda directly influences the public agenda, which also influences the policy agenda. However, the power of the media agenda depends on certain factors to include media credibility, conflicting evidence, the extent of shared values between the people and the media, and the public's need for guidance.

There are several criticisms about the way this theory affects the media. One complaint is that "media users are not ideal". This is because sometimes people do not focus on details. The second complaint is that "the effect is weakened for people who have made up their mind". This is also true. Lastly, the complaint is that "media cannot create problems". The problems occur through media but media is not the problem.

=== Public agenda ===
The public agenda is what the media agenda wants the public to think about through the interaction of mass media. This type of agenda influences the public through personal experience and interpersonal communication. The indicators of real-world events directly influence what the public thinks about and the importance of an agenda issue or an event. This agenda interacts with what is considered important by policymakers to create the policy agenda.

Public media has to deal with political communication as well. Agenda-setting theory was "formally developed by McCombs and Shaw (1972) when they studied the US Presidential Election of 1968."

=== Policy agenda ===
The policy agenda is directly related to both the media and public agenda, and is the last step in the agenda setting process. The agenda itself relates to policy and makes reference to the public agenda while it interacts with what policy makers believe.

==== Guidance and orientation ====
A contingency condition of the agenda-setting theory consists of two variables: relevance and uncertainty.

- Relevance is described as a motivation to seek orientation on an issue from the media due to the perception of personal importance that the issue holds for someone.
- Uncertainty is described as how much information people think they have about an issue.
- If people believe what they have is a great deal of information on a specific piece of media information regarding a topic, their uncertainty is low and will not need guidance.
- If people are unsure if they have enough information on a specific piece of media information regarding a topic, they will need more guidance from the medias present agenda. The variables interact with one another to explain deviations from the general principles of the agenda-setting theory.

=== Other considerations ===
==== Effects of media fragmentation and individual consumption patterns ====
Media fragmentation and individual consumption patterns have become vital in understanding how agenda-setting works within today's society.

===== Media fragmentation =====
The idea of a unified public agenda faces increasing challenges with the constant evolution of the media landscape. The rise of diverse news sources and platforms has led to a more fragmented media environment, where people selectively consume content aligning with their interests and beliefs. This fragmentation has significant implications as research indicates agenda diversity, the level of disagreement over what issues are most important, has increased dramatically in recent years. This trend is largely attributed to high-choice media environments which allow individuals to avoid news on topics they find less engaging.

===== Individual media consumption patterns =====
Individual consumption patterns have become increasingly more important in shaping personal agendas. Studies suggest most individual agendas are not consistent with traditional public agendas, emphasizing the need to consider personal influence in the social media era. As a result, agenda-setting has given rise to the "individual agenda", reflecting individual issue saliences rather than collective public agendas. Understanding these dynamics is crucial for policymakers, as the rise of agenda diversity can create ambiguity in interpreting public priorities, complicating the policymaking process.

== Comparison with policy agenda-building ==
The process involves not only active role of media organizations, but also participation of the public as well as policymakers. Rogers and Dearing highlighted the distinction between agenda-setting and agenda-building, emphasizing the dominant role of either media or the public. "Setting" an agenda refers to the effect of the media agenda on society, or transfer of the media agenda to the public agenda, while "building" an agenda includes "some degree of reciprocity" between the mass media and society where both media and public agendas influence public policy.

According to Sun Young Lee and Daniel Riffe, agenda-building theory speculates that the media does not operate within a vacuum. Instead, it is the result of the societal influences that certain powerful groups exert as a subtle form of control. While some scholars have attempted to uncover certain relationships between information sources and the agenda the news media has created, others have probed who sets the media agenda. Journalists have limited time and resources that can contribute to outside sources getting involved in the news media's gatekeeping process. Many sources can contribute to this agenda-building process in a variety of ways, but researchers are particularly interested in how well informational tools like press releases and media kits function within the news media agenda as a gauge of an organization's public relations success.

Berkowitz has implemented an extensive analysis of agenda-setting and agenda-building theories by introducing the terms policy agenda-setting and policy agenda-building. He argues that the term of policy agenda-setting is still appropriate to use when scholars focus solely on the relationship between the media and policymakers. However, when the focus is placed not only on policymakers' personal agendas, but also on the broader salient issues where media represent only one indicator of public sentiment, Berkowitz suggests talking about policy agenda-building.

=== Agenda-building ===
The agenda-building perspective emphasizes the interplay between mass media, policymakers, and social processes, recognizing ongoing mass involvement's influence on the policy-making process. Cobb and Elder assert that while the public can influence the media agenda, they do not significantly shape it; instead, journalists anticipate audience needs when generating story ideas. Journalists can estimate the public issue salience through opinion polls.

Kim and Lee noted that the agenda-setting research on the Internet differs from traditional agenda-setting research with respect that the Internet is in competition with traditional media and has enormous capacity for contents' and users' interactivity.

According to Kim and Lee, agenda-building through the Internet take the following three steps: 1) Internet-mediated agenda-rippling: an anonymous netizen's opinion spreads to the important agenda in the Internet through online main rippling channels such as blogs, personal homepages, and the Internet bulletin boards. 2) agenda diffusion in the Internet: online news or web-sites report the important agenda in the Internet that in turn leads to spreading the agenda to more online publics. 3) Internet-mediated reversed agenda-setting: traditional media report online agenda to the public so that the agenda spread to both offline and online publics.

Several studies provide evidence that the Internet-community, particularly bloggers, can push their own agenda into public agenda, then media agenda, and, eventually, into policy agenda. In the most comprehensive study to date, Wallsten tracked mainstream media coverage and blog discussion of 35 issues during the 2004 presidential campaign. Using time-series analysis, Wallsten found evidence that journalists discuss the issues that bloggers are blogging about. There are also anecdotal pieces of evidence suggesting bloggers exert an influence on the political agenda. For instance, in 2005 Eason Jordan, the chief news executive at CNN, abruptly resigned after being besieged by the online community after saying, according to various witnesses, that he believed the United States military had aimed at journalists in Iraq and killed 12 of them. Similarly, in 2002, Trent Lott had to resign as Senate majority leader due to his inappropriate racist remarks that were widely discussed in the blogosphere.

=== Agenda-setting ===
Some groups have a greater ease of access than others and are thus more likely to get their demands placed on agenda than others. For instance, policymakers have been found to be more influential than the overall group of news sources because they often better understand journalists' needs for reliable and predictable information and their definition of newsworthiness. Government-affiliated news sources have higher success rates in becoming media agenda and have been found by a number of scholars to be the most frequently appearing of sources at the local, state, and national levels. News sources can also provide definitions of issues, thus determining the terms of future discussion and framing problems in particular ways

The relationship of media and policymakers is symbiotic and is controlled by the shared culture of unofficial set of ground rules as journalists need access to official information and policymakers need media coverage; nevertheless the needs of journalists and policymakers are often incompatible because of their different time orientation as powerful sources are at their best in routine situations and react more slowly when crisis or disaster occur. Consequently, policymakers who understand the rules of this culture the best will be most capable of setting their agendas and issue definitions. Simultaneously, media also influences policymakers when government officials and politicians value the amount of media attention given to an issue as an indirect indication of public interest in the issue.

== Academic research ==
=== Review of studies ===
Various critiques have been made of agenda-setting theory:

- Studies tend to aggregate media content categories and public responses into very broad categories, resulting in inflated correlation coefficients.
- The theory seemed to imply that the audience takes a passive position. However, the public is not as passive as the theory assumed. Theorist John Fiske has challenged the view of a passive audience.

=== Additional factors ===
==== Impact of media on audience and quantum of impact on individuals in audience ====
In an attempt to overcome mirror-image effects of agenda-setting that implied direct influence of media agenda on the audience, several scholars proposed that the model of agenda-setting should include individual/collective audience characteristics or real-world conditions that are likely to affect issue importance. They discovered that certain individual and group characteristics are likely to act as contingent conditions of media impact and proposed a model of "audience effects". According to the audience-effects model, media coverage interacts with the audience's pre-existing sensitivities to produce changes in issue concerns. Thus, media effects are contingent on issue-specific audience characteristics.

Another factor that causes variations in the correlation between the media and public agenda is whether an issue is "obtrusive" or "unobtrusive"; i.e., whether it has a high or low issue threshold. Obtrusive, or issues with low threshold, are generally the ones that affect nearly everyone and with which we can have some kind of personal experience (e.g. citywide crime or increases in gasoline prices). This type of issues the problem would be of general concern even without attention from the news media. In regard to unobtrusive issues, this means that the less direct experience people have with an issue, the greater is the news media's influence on public opinion on that issue.

=== Theory development ===
==== Second-level agenda-setting: attribute agenda setting ====
Over time, agenda-setting theory evolved to include additional dimensions outside of the initial object salience level (specific issues, public figures, etc.). A second-level is now included which focuses on how the news media influences public opinion on the attributes of those objects. This is based around the selection of what attributes to present when covering certain issues or people. Balmas and Sheafer (2010) argued that the focus at the first level agenda-setting which emphasizes media's role in telling us "what to think about" is shifted to media's function of telling us "how to think about" at the second level agenda-setting. The second level of agenda-setting considers how the agenda of attributes affects public opinion (McCombs & Evatt, 1995). Furthermore, Ghanem(1997) demonstrated that the certain attributes agendas in the news with low psychological distance, drove compelling arguments for the salience of public agenda. For example, media coverage of a political candidate's experience would be included in the substantive dimension of second-level agenda-setting, whereas the attitude toward the candidate's experience (positive, negative, or neutral) would be included in the affective dimension.

===== Second-level agenda-setting vs. framing =====
There is a debate over whether framing theory should be subsumed within agenda-setting as "second-level agenda-setting". McCombs, Shaw, Weaver and colleagues generally argue that framing is a part of agenda-setting that operates as a "second-level" or secondary effect. Dietram Scheufele has argued the opposite. Scheufele argues that framing and agenda-setting possess distinct theoretical boundaries, operate via distinct cognitive processes (accessibility vs. attribution), and relate to different outcomes (perceptions of issue importance vs. interpretation of news issue).

One example that helps illustrate the effects of framing involves president Nixon's involvement in the watergate scandal. According to a study conducted by Lang and Lang, the media coverage at first belittled the watergate scandal and the President's involvement. It was not until the story was framed as one of the highest political scandals in US history that the public opinion changed. This event depicts how the media personnel have a great deal of power in persuading the public's opinions. It also suggests that framing is a form of gatekeeping, similar to the agenda setting theory.

According to Weaver, framing and second-level agenda setting have the following characteristics:

Similarities are

1. Both are more concerned with how issues or other objects are depicted in the media than with which issues or objects are more or less prominently reported.
2. Both focus on most salient or prominent aspects of themes or descriptions of the objects of interest.
3. Both are concerned with ways of thinking rather than objects of thinking

Differences are

1. Framing does seem to include a broader range of cognitive processes – moral evaluations, causal reasoning, appeals to principle, and recommendations for treatment of problems – than does second-level agenda-setting (the salience of attributes of an object).
  Scheufele and Tewksbury argue that "framing differs significantly from these accessibility-based models [i.e., agenda setting and priming]. It is based on the assumption that how an issue is characterized in news reports can have an influence on how it is understood by audiences;" the difference between whether we think about an issue and how we think about it. Framing and agenda setting differ in their functions in the process of news production, information processing and media effects.
2. News production: Although "both frame building and agenda building refer to macroscopic mechanisms that deal with message construction rather than media effects", frame building is more concerned with the news production process than agenda building. In other words, "how forces and groups in society try to shape public discourse about an issue by establishing predominant labels is of far greater interest from a framing perspective than from a traditional agenda-setting one."
3. News processing: For framing and agenda-setting, different conditions seem to be needed in processing messages to produce respective effects. Framing effect is more concerned with audience attention to news messages, while agenda setting is more concerned with repeated exposure to messages.
4. Locus of effect: Agenda-setting effects are determined by the ease with which people can retrieve from their memory issues recently covered by mass media, while framing is the extent to which media messages fit ideas or knowledge people have in their knowledge store.

Based on these shared characteristics, McCombs and colleagues recently argued that framing effects should be seen as the extension of agenda setting. In other words, according to them, the premise that framing is about selecting "a restricted number of thematically related attributes" for media representation can be understood as the process of transferring the salience of issue attributes (i.e., second-level agenda setting). That is, according to McCombs and colleagues' arguments, framing falls under the umbrella of agenda setting.

==== Third-level agenda-setting: network agenda setting model ====
The most recent agenda-setting studies explore "the extent to which the news media can transfer the salience of relationships among a set of elements to the public". That is, researchers assume that the media can not only influence the salience of certain topics in public agenda, but they can also influence how the public relate these topics to one another. Based on that, Guo, Vu and McCombs (2012) bring up a new theoretical model called network agenda setting model, which they refer to as the third-level agenda-setting. This model shows that "the news media can bundle sets of objects or attributes and make these bundles of elements salient in the public's mind simultaneously". In other words, elements in people's mind are not linear as traditional approaches indicate. Instead, they are interconnected with each other to make a network-like structure in one's mind, and if the news media always mention two elements together, the audience will "perceive these two elements as interconnected".

===== Dimension of emotion =====
According to the theory of affective intelligence, "emotions enhance citizen rationality". It argues that emotions, particularly negative ones, are crucial in having people pay attention to politics and help shape their political views. Based on that, Renita Coleman and H. Denis Wu (2010) study whether the TV portrayals of candidates impacts people's political judgment during the 2004 U.S. presidential Election. They find that apart from the cognitive assessment, which is commonly studied before, emotion is another critical dimension of the second-level affects in agenda-setting. Three conclusions are presented: the media's emotional-affective agenda corresponds with the public's emotional impressions of candidates; negative emotions are more powerful than positive emotions; and agenda-setting effects are greater on the audiences' emotions than on their cognitive assessments of character traits.

==== Hierarchy of effects theory ====
Coleman and Wu (2009) emphasized the similarities between the hierarchy of effects theory and agenda-setting theory, and how the latter can be used to analyze the former. The hierarchy of effects theory has three components: knowledge, attitude, and behavior, also known as "learn, feel, do." The first level of agenda-setting, such as a policy issue gaining public attention, corresponds to the "knowledge" component of the hierarchy of effects theory. The second level of agenda-setting, such as how the public views or feels about a policy issue, corresponds to the "attitude" component. Coleman and Wu's study is not so much focused on the order of these components, but instead on which component, knowledge (level one) and attitude (level two), has a greater effect on public behavior.

== Application ==
=== In the United States ===
==== Use of Twitter in political agenda-setting ====
Agenda setting theory has been particularly useful in the analysis of politicians' use of social media in the United States. A 2016 study of several thousand tweets from U.S. Governors used the first two levels of agenda-setting theory (issue level and framing) in order to better understand how politicians used Twitter as a platform. The research found that Democrats and Republicans used Twitter in nearly equal amounts to communicate their agendas, but Democrats were not as aligned in the agendas they prioritized. A later study found that newspapers and Twitter have a reciprocal relationship when it comes to predicting national policy issues during elections.

==== Non-political application ====
McCombs and Shaw originally established agenda-setting within the context of a presidential election and there have been numerous studies regarding agenda setting and politics. However, more recently scholars have been studying agenda setting in the context of brands. The theory can also be applied to commercial advertising, business news and corporate reputation, business influence on federal policy, legal systems, trials, roles of social groups, audience control, public opinion, and public relations.

- Agenda-setting in business communication: Corporate ranking systems have an agenda setting effect; when a business is highly ranked in these systems they are often displayed in the news media, which in turn keeps them in the minds of the public.
- Agenda-setting in advertising: Ghorpade demonstrated media's agenda-setting can "go beyond the transfer of silence to the effect of intended behavior" and is thus relevant to advertising.
- Agenda-setting in interpersonal communication: Those who rely on mass media for news influence those who mostly rely on interpersonal communication in regards to agendas. One study found that even those who rely on interpersonal communication for their news still share the same agenda that is prolific in the news media due to peers disseminating that agenda.
- Agenda-setting in health communication: Ogata Jones, Denham and Springston (2006) studied the mass and interpersonal communication on breast cancer screening practice and found that mass media is essential in "setting an agenda for proactive health behaviors". Women who were directly or indirectly exposed to news articles about breast cancer tended to conduct more frequent screenings than those had not read such articles. Additional research shows that effectively using social media platforms encourages health promotion and intervention as opposed to the traditional communicative strategies.
- Agenda setting and non-profit organizations: A study done in 2013 on the correlation between media coverage of natural disasters, the public's attention to the disaster, and donations to non-profit organizations for disaster relief showed a strong positive correlation between media coverage and public response to the disaster.

=== Outside the U.S. ===
==== Europe ====
In Europe, agenda-setting theory has been applied in a similar way to research in the United States. McCombs and Maxwell also investigated agenda-setting theory in the context of the 1995 regional and municipal elections in Spain.

==== China ====
Guoliang, Shao and Bowman found that agenda-setting effects in China are not as strong as in the Western world.

Another study found that in modern China, internet public opinion has emerged as a rival agenda-setting power to traditional media.

==== Japan ====
In an analysis of the policy-making process concerning temporary labor migration to Japan, researchers observed how migrant advocacy organizations influence public opinion through agenda setting, priming and framing, which had a limiting effect on the impact of other interest groups.

==== Saudi Arabia ====
A 2015 study found that social media is influential in the setting of the public agenda due to widespread dissemination and facilitation of the agendas of individuals.

=== Future research topics ===
==== Empowerment-of-masses and decentralizing impact of Internet ====
The advent of the Internet and social networks give rise to a variety of opinions concerning agenda-setting effects online. Some have claimed that the power of traditional media has been weakened. Others think that the agenda-setting process and its role have continued on the Internet, specifically in electronic bulletin boards. Popular handles on social media sites such as Twitter can choose what they want their followers to see. Users can also choose which accounts they want to follow and news they want to see on any social media platform. While some theorize that the rise of social media will bring a downfall to journalists' ability to set the agenda, there is considerable scholarship to counterbalance this form of thinking.

Traditional media such as newspapers and broadcast television are "vertical media" in which authority, power and influence come from the "top" and flow "down" to the public. Nowadays vertical media is undergoing rapid decline with the growing of "horizontal media" – new media enables everyone to become a source of information and influence, which means the media is "distributed horizontally instead of top-down".

==== Agenda-melding ====
Agenda-melding focuses on how individuals join groups and blend their agendas with the agendas of the group. Groups and communities represent a "collected agenda of issues" and "one joins a group by adopting an agenda". Now with the ease of access to media, people form their own agendas and then find groups that have similar agendas that they agree with.

The advances in technology have made agenda-melding accessible for people to develop because there is a wide range of groups and individual agendas. The Internet makes it possible for people all around the globe to find others with similar agendas and collaborate with them. In the past agenda setting was limited to general topics and it was geographically bound because travel was limited.

==== Agenda-cutting ====
One concept in the context of agenda-setting theory is the concept of agenda-cutting. Colistra defines agenda-cutting as the attempt to direct attention away from relevant issues "(1) by placing an item low on the news agenda (burying it), (2) by removing it from agenda once it is there, or (3) by completely ignoring it by never placing it on the agenda in the first place". Agenda-cutting is mainly seen to occur to news issues that are significant and controversial. Agenda-cutting needs to be motivated by the deliberate intention to drop a news issue from the agenda; a case of news omission does not qualify for agenda-cutting but rather constitutes a result of news selection (which tries to differentiate between the relevant and the irrelevant).

Despite being first mentioned in the 1980s by Mallory Wober and Barrie Gunter, agenda-cutting has only been sporadically taken up in scholarly research. One reason for the academic neglect of this concept is seen in the fact that there have been only few empirical investigations on the one hand, while no sufficient theoretical basis has been established on the other. First steps towards conceptualizing and operationalizing agenda-cutting have been put forward by Buchmeier.

Other studies shed light on the editorial processes in the newsroom which potentially lead to agenda-cutting. There are two non-profit media watchdog organizations whose mission is to draw attention to neglected and censored issues in the news: Project Censored in the US and INA (Initiative News Enlightenment) in Germany.

== See also ==
- Cognitive and research related concepts
  - Availability heuristic, "easily recallable example" bias
  - Framing effect, cognitive bias created by how options have been phrased
  - Hypodermic needle model, intended message directly received and accepted by intended recipient
  - Intertrial priming, accumulated effect of one stimuli impacts response to subsequent stimuli
  - Schema, cognitive though pattern which categorizes and links information
  - Cultivation theory, long-term effects of TV
- Political agenda
  - Overton window, range of policies politically acceptable to mainstream population
  - Policy by press release, influencing public policy by making press releases
  - Military–industrial–media complex, corrupt nexus which manipulates
  - Politico-media complex, corrupt nexus of policy builders and setters
  - Spin, public relation propaganda e.g. political bullshit
- Media related topics
  - Digital journalism
  - Media bias
  - News values, criteria for deciding which and how to report news
  - Racial bias in criminal news
  - Sensationalism
  - Yellow journalism, profit-driven ethicsless eye-catching news reporting
- Generic topics
  - Business communication
  - Marketing
  - Mass hysteria
  - Sociology
