= Agenda building =

Transfer of concerns to politicians

Agenda building describes the ongoing process by which various groups attempt to transfer their interests to be the interests of public policymakers. Conceptualized as a political science theory by Cobb and Elder in 1971, "the agenda-building perspective...alerts us to the importance of the environing social processes in determining what occurs at the decision-making stage and what types of policy outcomes will be produced.” It focuses on the relationship between society and policy maker.

Classic democratic theory focused on the assumption that calls on “public policymakers to advance the interests of civically engaged constituents, by an autonomous press” (i.e. classic theory focuses on the policy makers and media), however, it failed to account for points at which a larger society of stakeholders could define the range of alternatives available for policy making.

== Key assumptions ==
Agenda building assumes that the problems to which the government can give its attention are limited; and that what constitutes a policy problems is a matter of definition, dependent on beliefs and values, not just simple facts.

=== Other assumptions ===
- Process, not product: Agenda status is frequently fluid, and the status of an issue is developed through an elaborate competition between groups and how they jockey for control the range of issues acceptable for the agenda, either by attempting to force issues onto the agenda or to repel them, and to define and redefine how the issue is portrayed.
- Competition for attention: Competing actors/groups actively promote an issue or attributes of the issue that favor their interests to obtain the attention of a decision maker. Policy makers can only address what they know and care about. But “signals” from the media, constituents, special interests, etc. come into play, and attempt to alert and inform the policy maker
- Mutual influence between actors: The influence between actors (press, general public, issue publics, interest groups, elites, decision makers) does not flow in one direction, rather, it's a web of overlapping mutual influences.
- Different agendas: There are two kinds of agendas: institutional (policy dockets) and systemic (that which merits the attention of the public). More discrepancy between agendas means more societal conflict, as the space between what is important to the public widens between what is being addressed by policymakers.
- Bias in the sphere of influence: Some groups and individuals have more power to build the agenda. Bias exists because of differences in skills, access, education, socioeconomic status, ethnicity, etc. Elites, for example, generally have more power to influence the agenda.
- Issues typically stem from small groups: If the group wants to challenge the status quo, it behooves them to expand the issue to the public, or keep it out of the public to avoid attention from the opposition.
- Issue characteristics: Different issues have different characteristics that impact its place on the agenda, for example, issues that have previously been established enter the agenda with less resistance.

=== Key hypotheses ===
Scholars applying the agenda-building approach to research questions frequently identify the sources of the agenda building and the compare the resulting discourse to the sender's message, whether it is media coverage or policy. For example, Nisbet, Brossard, & Kroepsch, tracked media coverage; results showed that the George W. Bush administration was successful in driving coverage of the stem cell research controversy.

=== Major stages ===
Cobb, Ross & Ross proposed four primary steps in agenda building:

1. Initiation, the issue or controversy must be articulated in some terms.
2. Specification, a stakeholder group makes specific demands (e.g. policy).
3. Expansion, stakeholder groups seek to gain the attention of decision makers and to define the issue in terms favorable to the group.
4. Entrance, when the issue enters the formal agenda of the decision makers.

=== Compared to agenda setting ===
Agenda building, a concept found both in political science and communication scholarship, is distinct from, yet related to, agenda setting. However, the terms are frequently ill-defined: Berkowitz suggests, for example, applying the term agenda setting to situations regarding the effect of the media on the public and applying policy agenda building to situations that regard the perceptions of policymakers and how these perceptions are formed.

== Types of agendas ==
Scholars generally agree on the basic principles of agenda building, but as also noted above, the terminology is not agreed upon. Denham proposes a direction-specific typology to studying agenda building, and he uses the terms 1) policy agenda building, 2) media agenda-building, 3) public agenda building, and 4) intermedia agenda building. In all types, media is a key player.

1. Policy agenda building (group -> media -> policy). Direct lobbying of policymakers certainly occurs, however, groups often marshal the power of the media to mobilize a larger public and force issues onto the public agenda. For example, anti-abortion groups presented President George W. Bush with an agenda that included a ban on fetal stem cell research; media attention spiked as the struggle between competing groups (anti-abortion and pro-research) played out in the media. Greenpeace and a coalition of farming groups stopped trials of a genetically modified eggplant in the Philippines, however, pro-trial groups are active as well: Filipino newspapers have published stories featuring farmers calling for the technology to be commercialized and biology students calling for the ban to be overturned.
2. Media agenda building (constraints -> media-> policy) Many forces shape the media agenda; for example, journalistic routines (e.g. journalists rely on certain sources, often repeatedly), the need to produce daily content, organizational culture, fiscal constraints, etc. Perhaps particularly due to the increased constraints on journalistic practices, scholars of agenda building have paid particular attention to the public relations aspects of agenda building; concerted efforts on the part of public relations functions can impact news coverage, which can impact policy. For example, Berkowitz. tracked local and national TV and newspaper coverage, finding that more than 70% of TV news featured information found in press releases and from official sources. Public relations efforts by then-presidential candidates Barack Obama and John McCain were key determinants of media coverage abroad.
3. Public agenda setting (media -> public -> policy). When the media alerts the public to an issue (frequently through investigative reporting). Lang and Lang traced the power of the Washington Post Watergate investigation that led to President Nixon’s resignation; various media covered the issue, and soon the scandal was a daily headline, alarming the public into action.
4. Intermedia agenda building (media-> media-> public and/or policymaker). Media outlets look to each other for cues regarding what to cover. For example, The New York Times influences other media outlets.

Missing from Denhams’s typology is an account of how policymakers directly use media to build their own agendas (policymaker -> media -> public). Political actors need journalists to spread their message just as much as journalists need stories to write. Cook calls this “the negotiation of newsworthiness;” together journalists and sources (and occasionally others) interact to determine what is covered in the press, and how that content is presented. Policymakers hold a particular structural advantage in promoting their interests, particularly because they are reliable sources of news.

== Agenda building in the digital age ==
Regardless of agenda-building type, modern scholarship is beginning to expand the scope of what is considered media, and how the expanded universe of media will impact agenda building. Popular interactive platforms such as blogs, Facebook, and Twitter have become the conduit for the large-scale public interaction. The increased role of citizens signals a new direction for agenda-building research, given that the Internet has distributed the means of information production and fragmented the information environment, marking a shift in the power from legacy media to build monolithic agendas to anyone with the ability to get online.

Several studies show that agenda building effects occur in the digital age. YouTube influenced coverage of California's Proposition 8, and, possibly, impacted the referendum. Parmalee focused on agenda-setting and Twitter by interviewing journalists; he found that Twitter is a regular part of their routine. Wallsten compared media coverage and blog discussion; results showed that journalists concerns matched blogger concerns. Jacobson found that comments on Rachel Maddow's Facebook page influenced the broadcast. In the scientific context, Runge, Brossard, Scheufele, & Xenos found that social media played a key role in defining the "pink slime" issue, and the industry had to defend what they normally call “lean finely textured beef.”

There is also anecdotal evidence of digital agenda building:

- One of the first examples of digital agenda-building concerns the resignation of Trent Lott. In 2002, Lott resigned Senate majority leader due to racist comments that he made at Strom Thurmond's birthday party. Bloggers took up the issue, forced the mainstream media to do so, which eventually forced Lott to resign.
- Mitt Romney’s “47%”. Scout Pouty, a bartender, posted a video on YouTube that showed Romney dismissing “47% of Americans” who he alleged were over relying on the government. It was picked up by smaller news organizations, but later, mainstream media covered the story, and while Romney's comments may have been taken out of context, they nonetheless damaged the campaign.
- Michele Landis Dauber, an attorney present at the sentencing of Brock Turner, facilitated the sharing of the victim's impact statement with BuzzFeed, which eventually led to wide coverage in the mainstream media and the attention of prominent political figures. The judge in the case, Aaron Persky, is facing recall and now presides over civil, rather than criminal, cases.

=== Algorithms ===
Scholars are now starting to address what agenda building means, and what impact it has, when both machines and human beings set the agenda. Algorithms, such as the ranking algorithms in use at Facebook, apply previous online behavior to predict future interests to serve personalized content; the underlying, unseen algorithm manifests itself in the form of what information is presented to the viewer. The impact of algorithmic editorial decision-making, particularly at Facebook, is immense: “...the results of [the] automated linking process shape the social lives and reading habits of more than 1 billion daily active users - one-fifth of the world’s adult population...it can be tweaked to make us happy or sad; it can expose us to new and challenging ideas or insulate us in ideological bubbles." Facebook downplays its role as publisher, but given that Facebook has become a major distributor of news, that platforms such as Facebook are “just the pipes” is an increasingly untenable stance to take.

==== Controversy ====
Algorithmic determinism of news has not been without controversy. For example, Facebook recently came under fire for censoring the “Napalm girl” photo of Phan Thị Kim Phuc (they blamed the algorithm), it conducted an emotional contagion experiment on users without their knowledge, and in 2016 was accused of having a liberal bias by conservative public figures in the US.
