= Lung cancer screening =

Testing asymptomatic patients for lung cancer

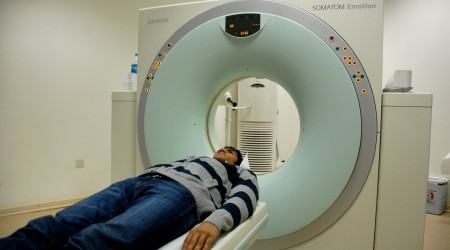
- Computed tomography (CT) scanner, a commonly recommended screening technique
- Purpose: Identify early lung cancers

§ Lung cancer screening refers to cancer screening strategies used to identify early lung cancers before they cause symptoms, at a point where they are more likely to be curable. Lung cancer screening is critically important because of the incidence and prevalence of lung cancer. More than 235,000 new cases of lung cancer are expected in the United States in 2021 with approximately 130,000 deaths expected in 2021. In addition, at the time of diagnosis, 57% of lung cancers are discovered in advanced stages (III and IV), meaning they are more widespread or aggressive cancers. Because there is a substantially higher probability of long-term survival following treatment of localized (60%) versus advanced stage (6%) lung cancer, lung cancer screening aims to diagnose the disease in the localized (stage I) stage. However, lower socioeconomic areas, where income inequality and lower education are social determinants that contribute to preventing adequate lung cancer screening, resulting in a sense of delayed lung cancer screening and treatment, places an additional increase to the mortality rate.

Results from large randomized studies such as the U.S. National Lung Screening trials (NLST) have recently prompted a large number of professional organizations and governmental agencies in the U.S. to recommend lung cancer screening in select populations now. The three main types of lung cancer screening are low-dose, computerized tomographic (LDCT) screening, chest x-rays, and sputum cytology tests. Currently multiple professional organizations, as well as the United States Preventive Services Task Force (USPSTF), the Centers for Medicare and Medicaid Services (CMS) and the European Commission's science advisors concur and endorse low-dose, computerized tomographic screening for individuals at high-risk of lung cancer.

== Findings ==
Most cancers found in lung cancer screening programs arise from solid or part-solid nodules; only very few from non-solid nodules. Most cancers (over 90%) were diagnosed in nodules with baseline volume ≥300 mm3. Larger nodules (≥300 mm3) are more often located in the upper lobes.

== Guidelines ==
Low Dose Chest CT (LDCT) Scan

The definition of who is considered to be at sufficiently high risk to benefit from lung cancer screening varies according to different guidelines.

=== U.S. Preventive Services Task Force ===
The 2021 U.S. Preventive Services Task Force guidelines recommend annual screening for lung cancer with low-dose computed tomography in adults aged 50 to 80 years who have a 20 pack-year smoking history and currently smoke or have quit within the past 15 years. Screening should be discontinued once a person has either not smoked for 15 years, or develops a health problem that substantially limits the person's life expectancy or the ability or willingness to have curative lung surgery.

=== National Comprehensive Cancer Network (NCCN) ===
The National Comprehensive Cancer Network (NCCN) suggests screening for two high risk groups. Group 1 guidelines include 55–77 years of age, 30 or more pack years of smoking and has quit within the past 14 years, and are a current smoker. Group 2 includes those 50 years of age or older, 20 or more pack years of smoking, and other risk factors excluding second-hand smoke.

Other risk factors include:

- contact with specific carcinogens: radon, arsenic, beryllium, cadmium, chromium, nickel, asbestos, coal smoke, soot, silica, or diesel fumes;
- personal history of cancer;
- family history of lung cancer; or
- history of COPD or pulmonary fibrosis.

=== European Commission ===
In 2022, the European Commission's Scientific Advice Mechanism concluded that "there is a strong scientific basis for introducing lung screening for current and ex-smokers using the latest technologies, such as low-dose CT scanning".

== Risks ==
Low-dose CT screening has been associated with falsely positive test results which may result in unneeded treatment. In a series of studies assessing the frequence of false positive rates, results reported that rates ranged from 8-49%. The false-positive rate declined when more screening rounds were performed. Other concerns include radiation exposure, the cost of testing alone, and the cost of follow-up tests and imaging. False reassurance from false negative findings, over-diagnosis, short term anxiety or distress, and increased rate of incidental findings are other risks. The currently used low dose CT scan results in a radiation exposure of about 2 millisieverts (equal to roughly 20 two-view chest x-rays). It has been estimated that radiation exposure from repeated screening studies could induce cancer formation in a small percentage of screened subjects, so this risk should be mitigated by a (relatively) high prevalence of lung cancer in the population being screened.

Psychosocial Considerations

Timing in the lung cancer screening journey can play a vital role in the psychosocial burdens that come to patients. The post screening period, also known as the "waiting period", was found to be a time where patients experienced elevated levels of screening-specific distress as the anticipation post screening led to patients having intrusive thoughts and dread. The waiting time could be considered an initial driver of negative psychosocial burdens before the results are available. However, the time that patients experience the most significant short-term burst of anxiety and cancer-specific distress comes immediately after their results, regardless of whether the results were intermediate, false-positive, or positive. The "short-term" effect used in the studies is defined as lasting a few days to a few months and resolving in long-term follow-ups of 6 months to 1 year post.

Post-screening results that are either negative, indeterminate, positive, or false-positive were found to have different psychosocial effects on patients. Patients who were given normal or negative screening results were shown to have a reduction in their intrusive thoughts, which they initially developed during their waiting period. Patients who were given indeterminate results, which are models that are still under surveillance, were found to experience a short-term increase in distress and anxiety, but these symptoms were commonly resolved after long-term follow-up. False positive and or suspicious results among patients were associated with short-term anxiety and fear, as well as some prolonged psychological distress upon some follow-ups. The common risk factors most likely to experience psychosocial effects during lung cancer screenings were. Females, younger sex, lower education or socioeconomic status; not married or no kids, and those with pre-existing psychosocial distress . However, these findings are inconsistent across studies.

Psychosocial interventions

Though not many, there are a few interventions that can be implemented to reduce the psychosocial burdens from lung cancer screenings. The most common suggestion across studies is to provide clear information to patients, manage expectations, shorten the time between screening and results, and offer structured follow-up that patients most desire. Regarding clear patient information and expectation management, the use of brief pre-screening educational tools, such as a 5-minute video and a handbook, showed promising results in reducing screening-specific distress. In some trials, shared decision-making during pre-test counseling was found to be feasible for reducing short-term worrying. Regarding communication and the shortened time between screening and results, using simpler language with patients about their results, waiting period, and treatment is recommended to help reduce waiting-related distress; however, no psychological benefits were observed. Other recommended interventions, such as stigma-sensitive communication integrated with smoking reduction support, were believed to help with distress and avoidance, but should be further observed. Post-diagnosis, additional interventions could be implemented, such as mindfulness-based psycho-education, which can be beneficial for screen-related distress.

== Attendance ==
Poverty can reduce the numbers of people attending lung cancer screening. A UK study showed that making the screening easily accessible increased take-up. Providing mobile screening units parked in supermarket car parks, for example, in the poorer areas of Manchester was an acceptable way of offering lung checks to high-risk groups such as smokers. A simple test measured obstruction to the flow of air in and out of the lungs. A third of the tests showed airflow obstruction, a sign of chronic obstructive pulmonary disease which is a risk factor for lung cancer and other health conditions.

Stigma associated with lung cancer and smoking can also act as a major barrier to screening. Individuals who currently smoke or have a history of smoking often experience judgment or blame surrounding their perceived responsibility for developing the disease. This perceived stigma can greatly reduce likelihood to participate in screening programs, especially among populations facing socioeconomic disadvantages.

== History ==
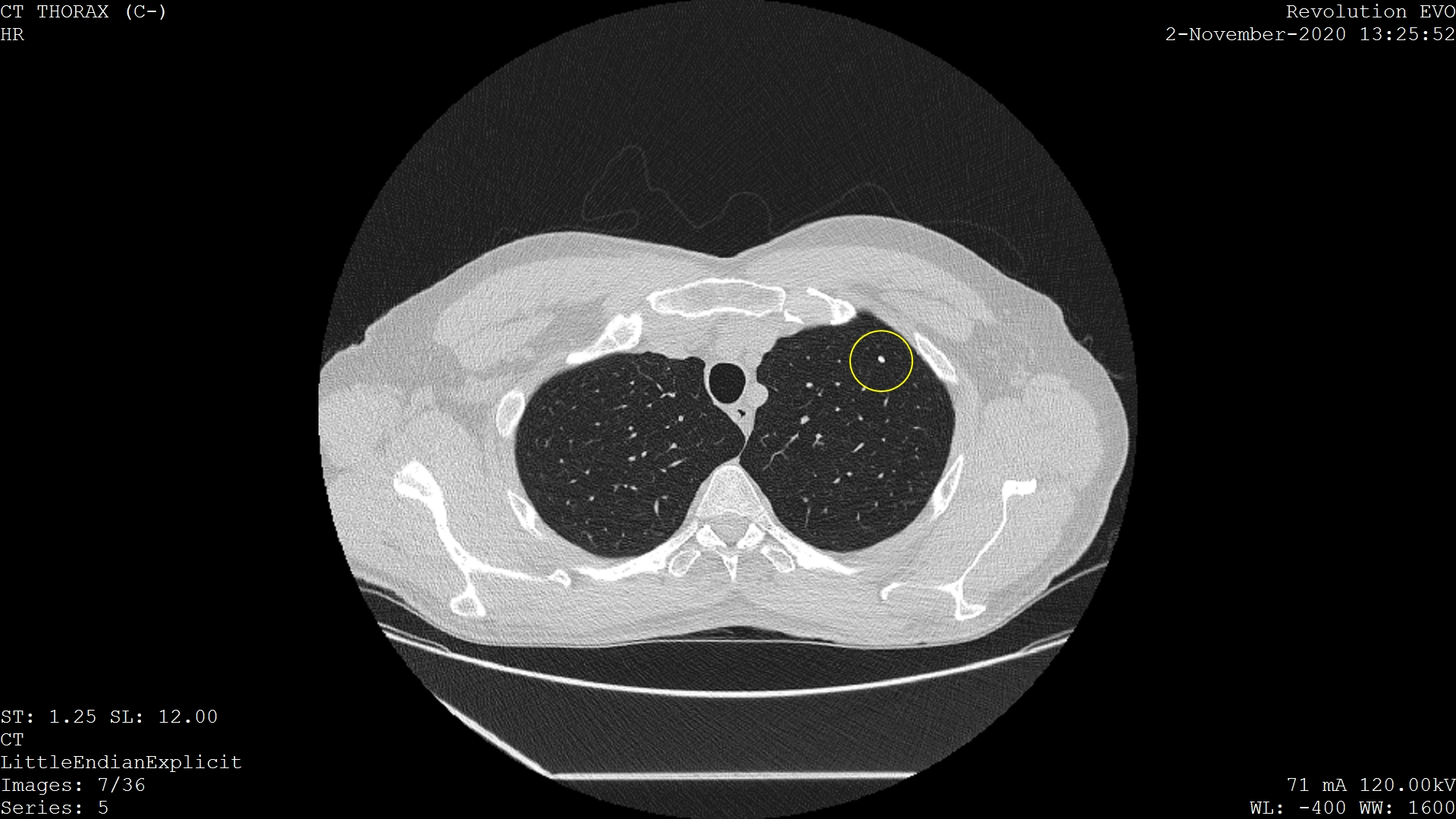
Calcified lung nodule seen on Low Dose Chest CT (circled)

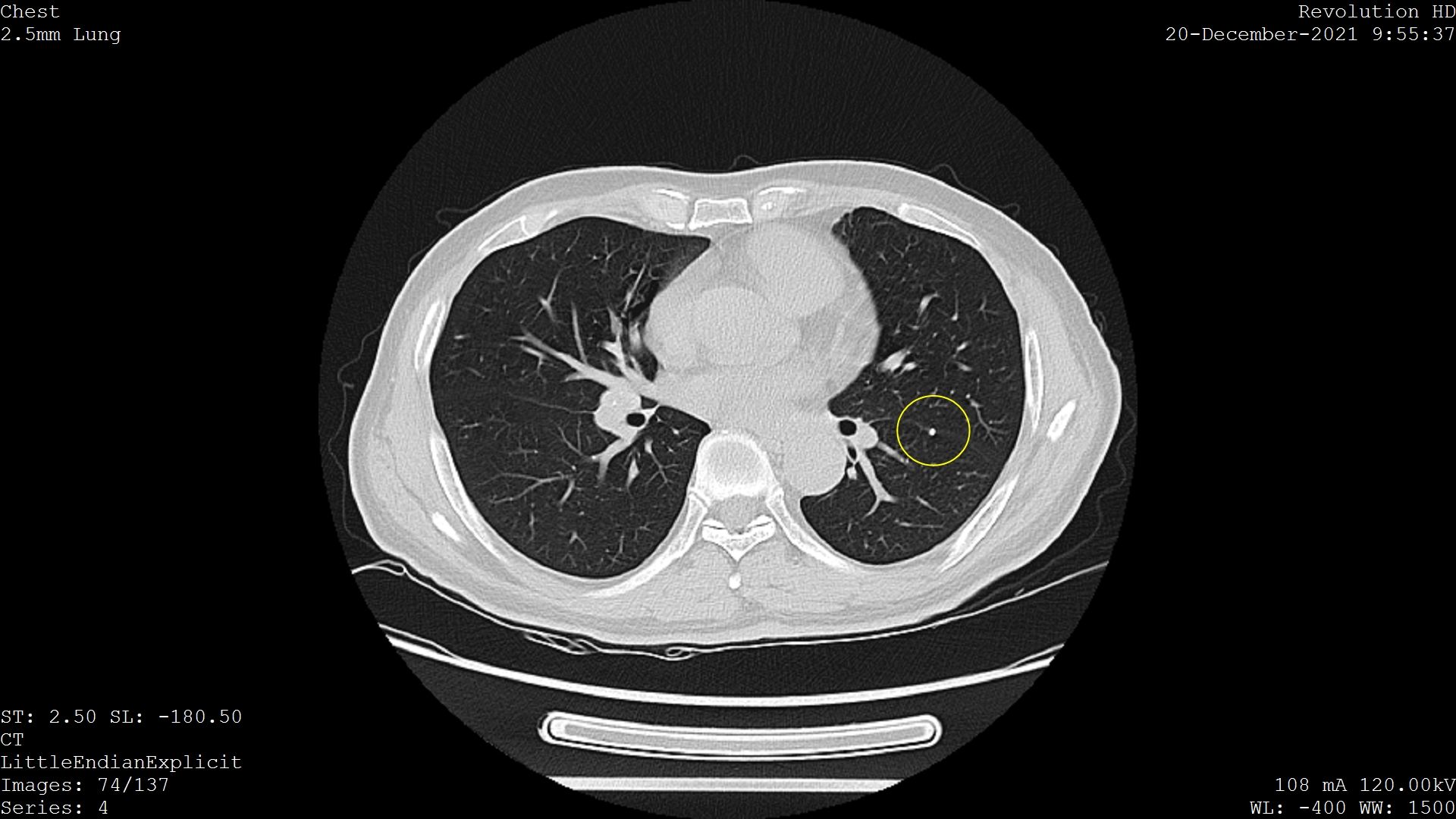
Calcified lung nodule seen on Standard Dose Chest CT (circled)

Systematic examination of lung cancer screening began in the 1970s when the National Cancer Institute (NCI) sponsored clinical trials to examine chest x-rays and sputum cytology at Johns Hopkins, Memorial Sloan-Kettering Cancer Center, and Mayo Clinic. In the Mayo Clinic study, termed "The Mayo Lung Project," researchers randomized over 9,000 male smokers age 45 and older to receive either chest x-ray and sputum screening three times a year, or annual chest x-ray screening. The results showed that more frequent screening resulted in higher resectability rate (more early-stage detection) but made no difference in mortality from lung cancer. Chest x-ray screenings were found to detect 6 times as many new cancers as sputum tests, proving the disutility of sputum tests in lung cancer screening. However, the results from the Mayo Lung Project and the Hopkins and Memorial Sloan-Kettering studies were eventually discredited, due to failure to account for lead time and length time bias. Since none demonstrated reduced lung cancer incidence or mortality between randomized groups, chest x-ray was determined to be an ineffective screening tool.

In the following years, the scientific community shifted its attention to computed tomography (CT). In 1996, results were published of a study of 1369 subjects screened in Japan that revealed that 73% of lung cancers that were missed by chest x-ray were detectable by CT scan. Among the earliest United States-based clinical trials was the Early Lung Cancer Action Project (ELCAP), which published its results in 1999. ELCAP screened 1000 volunteers with low-dose CT and chest x-ray. They were able to detect non-calcified nodules in 23% of patients by CT compared with 7% by chest x-ray. While this trial and a similar trial conducted by Mayo Clinic in 2005 demonstrated that CT was able to detect lung cancer at a higher rate than chest x-ray, both these trials used survival improvement, rather than mortality reduction, as an outcome, and thus were unable to prove that the use of CTs in lung cancer screening was actually impacting the number of people dying from lung cancer.

In 2006, results of CT screening on over 31,000 high-risk patients – an expansion study of the Early Lung Cancer Action Project – was published in The New England Journal of Medicine. In this study, 85% of the 484 detected lung cancers were stage I and thus highly treatable. Historically, such stage I patients would have an expected 10-year survival of 88%. Critics of the I-ELCAP study point out that there was no randomization of patients (all received CT scans and there was no comparison group receiving only chest x-rays) and the patients were not actually followed out to 10 years post-detection (the median followup was 40 months).

In contrast, a March 2007 study in The Journal of the American Medical Association (JAMA) found no mortality benefit from CT-based lung cancer screening. 3,200 current or former smokers were screened for 4 years and offered 3 or 4 CT scans. Lung cancer diagnoses were 3 times as high, and surgeries were 10 times as high, as predicted by a model, but there were no significant differences between observed and expected numbers of advanced cancers or deaths. Additional controversy arose after a 2008 New York Times reported that the 2006, pro-CT scan study in The New England Journal of Medicine had been funded indirectly by the parent company of the Liggett Group, a tobacco company.

In 2011, the National Lung Screening Trial found that CT screening offers benefits over other screenings. This study was recognized for providing supporting evidence for using CT to screen for lung cancer and for encouraging others to reflect on the merits and drawbacks of other types of screening. This trial led to a recommendation in the United States that CT screening be used on people at high risk for developing lung cancer in an effort to detect the cancer earlier and reduce mortality.

=== Development of guidelines ===
After the National Cancer Institute's National Lung Screening Trial publication in 2011, many national organizations revised their guidelines.

The initial findings from the National Lung Institute (NLST) found a 20% reduction in lung cancer-related death for patients who were older and were currently or previously heavy smokers when receiving annual low-dose CT scans, compared to chest x-rays. These findings led to recommendations from the U.S. Preventive Services Task Force (USPSTF) and many other medical organizations .

In December 2013, the U.S. Preventive Services Task Force (USPSTF) changed its long-standing recommendation that there is insufficient evidence to recommend for or against screening for lung cancer to the following: "The USPSTF recommends annual screening for lung cancer with low-dose computed tomography in adults ages 55 to 80 years who have a 30 pack-year smoking history and currently smoke or have quit within the past 15 years. Screening should be discontinued once a person has not smoked for 15 years or develops a health problem that substantially limits life expectancy or the ability or willingness to have curative lung surgery".

Similarly, clinical practice guidelines previously issued by the American College of Chest Physicians (ACCP) in 2007 recommended against routine screening for lung cancer because of a lack of evidence that such screening was effective. The 2013 ACCP guidelines take into account findings from the National Lung Screening Trial and state: "For smokers and former smokers who are age 55 to 74 and who have smoked for 30 pack-years or more and either continue to smoke or have quit within the past 15 years, we suggest that annual screening with low-dose CT (LDCT) should be offered over both annual screening with CXR or no screening, but only in settings that can deliver the comprehensive care provided to National Lung Screening Trial participants (Grade 2B)". The most recent 2021 guidelines divide their seven recommendations into "strong" and "weak" and the evidence behind it as "moderate-quality" and "low-quality". Their one strong recommendation with moderate-quality evidence is: "For asymptomatic individuals age 55 to 77 who have smoked 30 pack years or more and either continue to smoke or have quit within the past 15 years, we recommend that annual screening with low-dose CT should be offered."

Guidelines were released initially in 2012 by the National Comprehensive Cancer Network, an alliance of now 31 cancer centers in the United States. Their consensus guidelines are updated annually. These guidelines support screening as a process, not a single test, and discuss risks and benefits of screening in high risk individuals within a comprehensive multidisciplinary program. Screening is only recommended for individuals defined as high risk meeting specific criteria. More details can be found in their patient guidelines. While lung cancer screening programs have been supported by the NCCN, International Association for the Study of Lung Cancer (IASLC), American Cancer Society, The American Society of Clinical Oncology (ASCO), and other organizations, the costs of screening may not be covered by medical insurance policies, unless the eligibility criteria specified by the Centers for Medicare and Medicaid Services (CMS) are met. As of 2017, usage of lung cancer screening in the U.S. after Medicare agreed to pay for screening and after guidelines were published was low, with the most uptake in the Midwest. In 2017 a task force published a review of evidence and recommendations for advancing implementation.

In 2014, the National Health Service (NHS) of England was re-examining the evidence for screening. In 2019, the NHS implemented the Targeted Lung Health Checks program in order to target those most at risk of lung cancer.

In 2022, the European Union proposed to update its guidelines on cancer screening to take into account new evidence that had emerged since 2016. A comprehensive evidence review by the European Commission's Scientific Advice Mechanism recommended lung cancer screening for current and former smokers, combined with smoking cessation programmes.

== Shared decision-making ==
Shared decision-making involves the introduction of a third party into the patient/physician equation when dealing with decisions regarding lung cancer screening. A 2018 review article found that previous studies recorded less than half of patients being asked about their screening preferences. Lack of information about the benefits and downfalls of screening led to many patients feeling uninformed when making a decision on whether or not to get screened. One of the methods ongoing the most testing is that of decision aids, exist to inform the patient on all of their options and to help them come to a consensus on what their stance might be. These aids range from online surveys to videos, some examples include "shouldiscreen.com" and the "Lung Cancer Screening Decision Aid" (LuCaS Da). The aids help people make informed decisions for their care that also take their personal values and beliefs into consideration. With shouldiscreen.com specifically, 97% of people who used the aid reported that it was helpful in deciding whether or not to get screened for lung cancer. The results also showed that patients had increased levels of knowledge about screening and less internal conflict after completing the aid. These aids not only work to improve patients' understanding of the screening process, but also takes pressure off of the medical professionals as a third-party source of knowledge.
