= Epidemiology of cancer =

Study of factors in cancer causes and treatments

Age-adjusted death rate from cancer per 100,000 inhabitants, 2004: no data less than 55 55–80 80–105 105–130 130–155 155–180 180–205 205–230 230–255 255–280 280–305 more than 305

Age adjusted, new cases of cancer, 2017

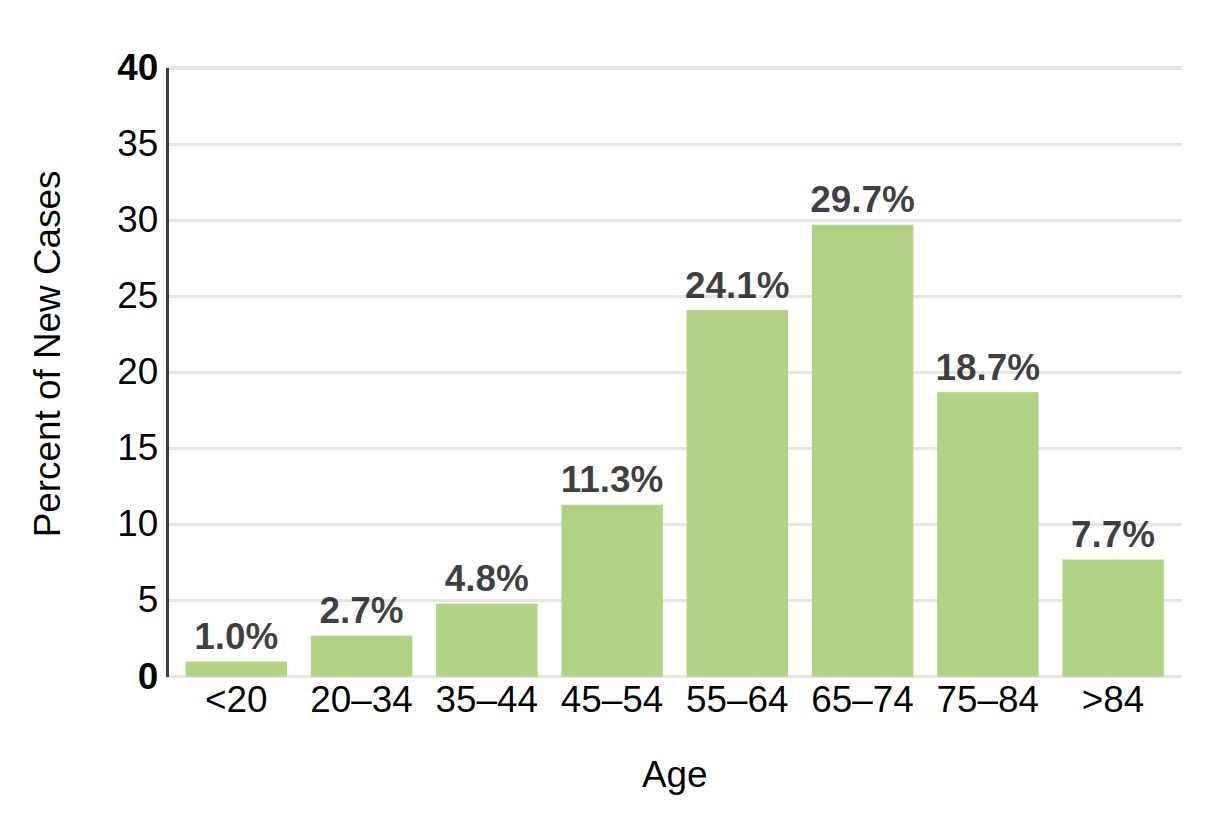
The percent of new US cancer cases by age, 2023

The epidemiology of cancer is the study of the factors affecting cancer, as a way to infer possible trends and causes. The study of cancer epidemiology uses analysis of the incidence and distribution patterns with determinants of health and disease conditions in a defined population to find the cause of cancer and to identify and develop improved treatments.

This area of study must contend with problems of lead time bias and length time bias. Lead time bias is the concept that early diagnosis may artificially inflate the survival statistics of a cancer, without really improving the natural history of the disease. Length bias is the concept that slower growing, more indolent tumors are more likely to be diagnosed by screening tests, but improvements in diagnosing more cases of indolent cancer may not translate into better patient outcomes after the implementation of screening programs. A related concern is overdiagnosis, the tendency of screening tests to diagnose diseases that may not actually impact the patient's longevity. This problem especially applies to prostate cancer and PSA screening.

Some cancer researchers have argued that negative cancer clinical trials lack sufficient statistical power to discover a benefit to treatment. This may be due to fewer patients enrolled in the study than originally planned.

== Organizations ==
State and regional cancer registries are organizations that abstract clinical data about cancer from patient medical records. These institutions provide information to state and national public health groups to help track trends in cancer diagnosis and treatment. One of the largest and most important cancer registries is Surveillance Epidemiology and End Results (SEER), administered by the US Federal government.

Health information privacy concerns have led to the restricted use of cancer registry data in the United States Department of Veterans Affairs and other institutions. The American Cancer Society predicts that approximately 1,690,000 new cancer cases will be diagnosed and 577,000 Americans will ultimately die of cancer in 2012.

== Studies ==
Observational epidemiological studies that show associations between risk factors and specific cancers mostly serve to generate hypotheses about potential interventions that could reduce cancer incidence or morbidity. Randomized controlled trials then test whether hypotheses generated by epidemiological studies and laboratory research actually result in reduced cancer incidence and mortality. In many cases, findings from observational epidemiological studies are not confirmed by randomized controlled trials.

== Risk factors ==
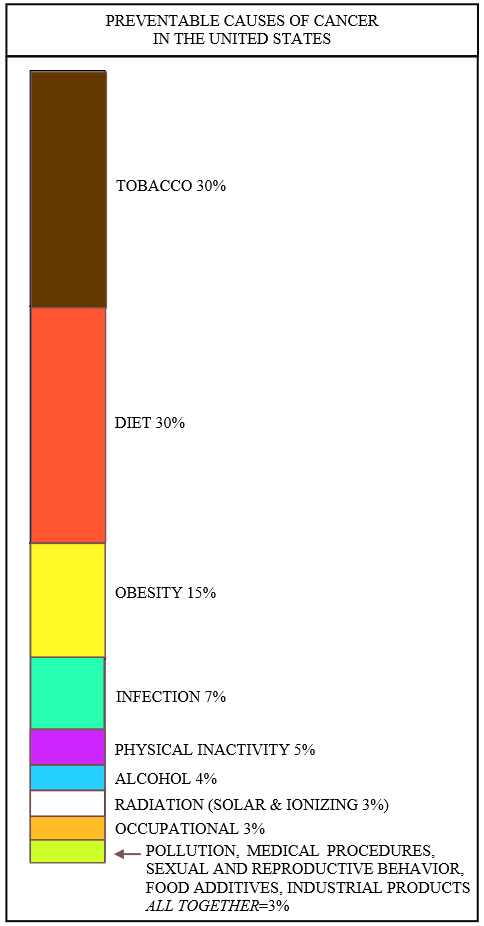
The approximate relative levels of the preventable causes of cancer in the United States, taken from the article Cancer prevention

According to the National Cancer Institute the factor which corresponds mostly to a positive probability of cancer is increasing age. A The Lancet survey published 2022 found the most risk causing factor was tobacco consumption by smoking.

Although the age-related increase in cancer risk is well-documented, the age-related patterns of cancer are complex. Some types of cancer, like testicular cancer, have early-life incidence peaks, for reasons unknown. Besides, the rate of age-related increase in cancer incidence varies between cancer types with, for instance, prostate cancer incidence accelerating much faster than brain cancer. It has been proposed that the age distribution of cancer incidence can be viewed as the distribution of probability to accumulate the required number of driver events by the given age.

Over a third of cancer deaths worldwide (and about 75-80% of cancers in the United States) are due to potentially modifiable risk factors. The leading modifiable risk factors worldwide are:

- tobacco smoking, which is strongly associated with lung cancer, mouth, and throat cancer;
- drinking alcohol, which is associated with a small increase in oral, esophageal, breast, liver and other cancers;
- a diet low in fruit and vegetables,
- physical inactivity, which is associated with increased risk of colon, breast, and possibly other cancers
- obesity, which is associated with colon, breast, endometrial, and possibly other cancers
- sexual transmission of human papillomavirus, which causes cervical cancer and some forms of anal cancer, vaginal cancer, vulvar cancer, penile cancer, rectal cancer, and oropharyngeal cancer.

Other lifestyle and environmental factors known to affect cancer risk (either beneficially or detrimentally) include the use of exogenous hormones (e.g., hormone replacement therapy causes breast cancer), exposure to ionizing radiation and ultraviolet radiation, and certain occupational and chemical exposures. A Western diet is associated with increased exposure of the gastrointestinal tract to bile acids that are produced by the body to digest fatty foods. Bile acids are likely endogenous etiologic agents in gastrointestinal cancer.

Every year, at least 200,000 people die worldwide from cancer related to their workplace. Millions of workers run the risk of developing cancers such as pleural and peritoneal mesothelioma from inhaling asbestos fibers, or leukemia from exposure to benzene at their workplaces. Currently, most cancer deaths caused by occupational risk factors occur in the developed world. It is estimated that approximately 20,000 cancer deaths and 40,000 new cases of cancer each year in the U.S. are attributable to occupation.

== Rates and mortality ==
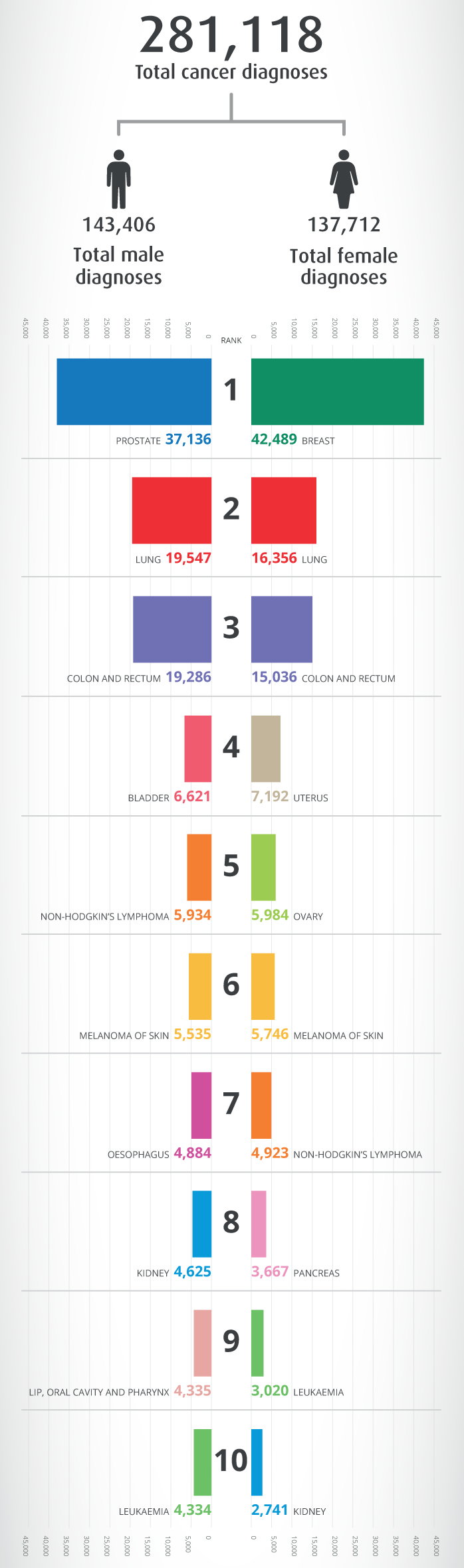
New cancer diagnosis in England, 2012

In the U.S. cancer is second only to cardiovascular disease as the leading cause of death; in the UK it is the leading cause of death. In many developing countries cancer incidence, insofar as this can be measured, appears much lower, most likely because of the higher death rates due to infectious disease or injury. With the increased control over malaria and tuberculosis in some Third World countries, incidence of cancer is expected to rise. In the Eastern Mediterranean region, for example, in 2008, cancer incidence was expected to increase by 100% to 180% in the next 15 years due to increases in life expectancy, an increasing proportion of elderly people, and the successful control of childhood disease. This is termed an epidemiologic transition in epidemiological terminology.

Cancer epidemiology closely mirrors risk factor spread in various countries. Hepatocellular carcinoma (liver cancer) is rare in the West but is the main cancer in China and neighbouring countries, most likely due to the endemic presence of hepatitis B and aflatoxin in that population. Similarly, with tobacco smoking becoming more common in various Third World countries, lung cancer incidence has increased in a parallel fashion.

=== India ===
In 2015, more than 1,300 Indians died every day due to cancer. Between 2012 and 2014, the mortality rate due to cancer increased by approximately 6%. In 2012, there were 478,180 deaths out of 2,934,314 cases reported. In 2013 there were 465,169 deaths out of 3,016,628 cases. In 2014, 491,598 people died in out of 2,820,179 cases. In 2013, the incidence and mortality of cancer is highest in the north-eastern region of India. In 2015, breast cancer was the most common, and stomach cancer was the leading cause of death by cancer. In 2015, breast cancer and lung cancer killed the most women and men respectively.

=== Canada ===
In 2007, cancer was the number one cause of death, contributing to 29.6% of all deaths in Canada. The second highest cause of death was cardiovascular diseases, resulting in 21.5% of deaths. In 2011, prostate cancer was the most common form of cancer among males (about 28% of all new cases) and breast cancer the most common in females (also about 28% of all new cases).

The leading cause of death in both males and females is lung cancer, which contributes to 26.8% of all cancer deaths. Statistics indicate that between the ages of 20 and 50 years, the incidence rate of cancer is higher amongst women whereas after 50 years of age, the incidence rate increases in men. Predictions by the Canadian Cancer Society indicate that with time, there will be an increase in the rates of incidence of cancer for both males and females.

=== United States ===
In 2008, cancer was responsible for 25% of all US deaths, with 30% of these from lung cancer. In 2008, the most commonly occurring cancer in men was prostate cancer, at about 25% of new cases. In 2008, amongst women, breast cancer was the most commonly occurring cancer, with about 25% of cancer diagnoses. Cancer can occur in children and adolescents, but it is uncommon, with about 150 cases per million in the U.S., with leukemia being the most common. In the first year of life, the incidence is about 230 cases per million in the U.S., with the most common being neuroblastoma. From 2004 to 2008, the US overall age-adjusted incidence of cancer was approximately 460 per 100,000 men and women per year.

In 2008, cancer was responsible for about 25% of all US deaths. The statistics below are estimates for the U.S. in 2008, and may vary substantially in other countries. They exclude basal and squamous cell skin cancers, and carcinoma in situ in locations other than the urinary bladder. As seen, breast/prostate cancer, lung cancer and colorectal cancer are responsible for approximately half of cancer incidence. The same applies for cancer mortality, but with lung cancer replacing breast/prostate cancer as the main cause.

In 2016, an estimated 1,685,210 new cases of cancer will be diagnosed in the United States and 595,690 people will die from the disease.

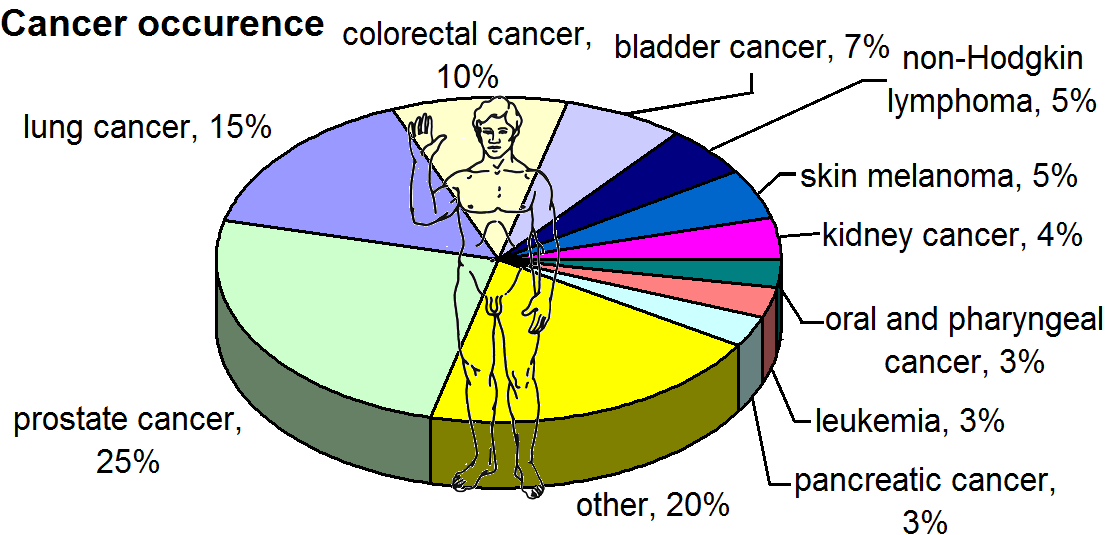
The most common cancers in US males, by occurrence, 2008

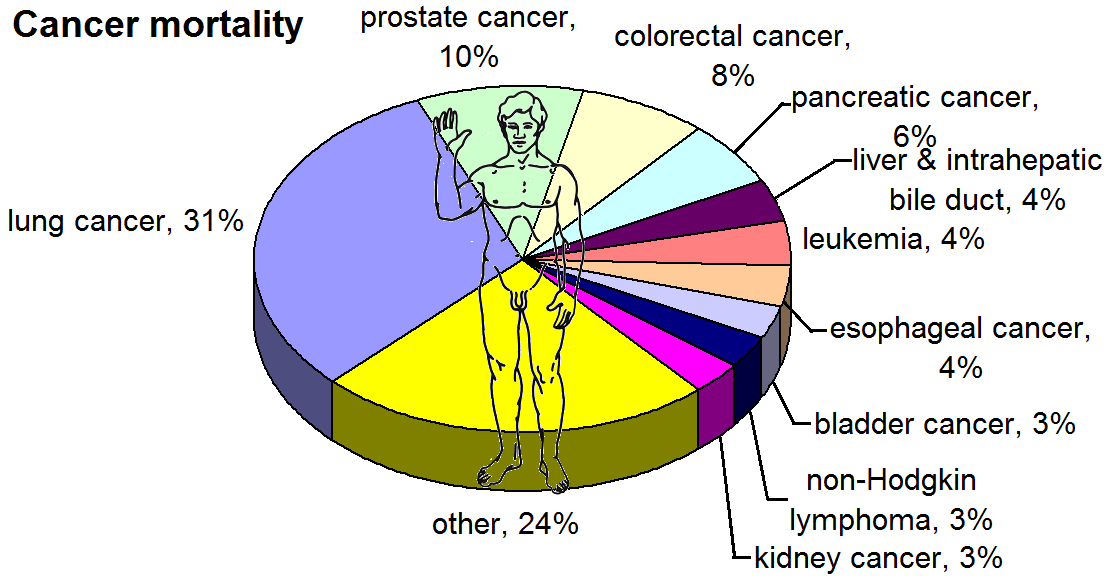
In US males, by mortality, 2008
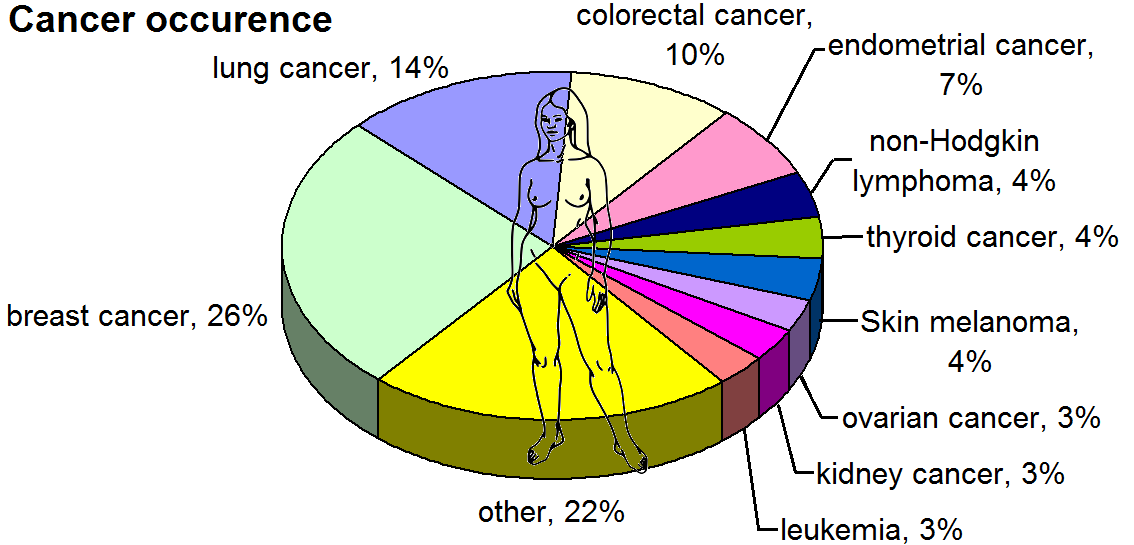
In US females, by occurrence, 2008

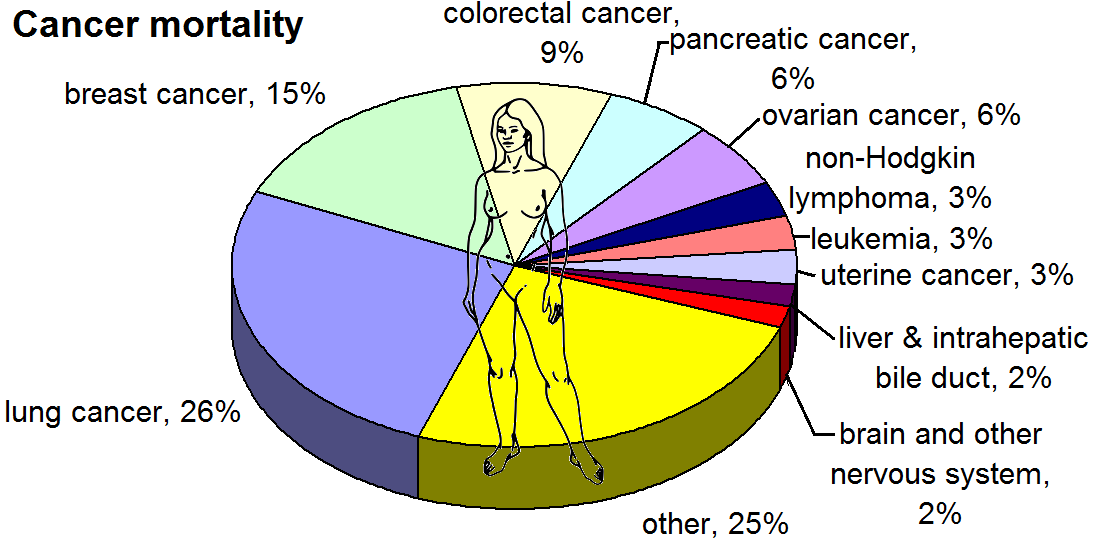
In US females, by mortality, 2008

Male		Female	
Most common, by occurrence, 2008.	Most common, by mortality, 2008.	Most common, by occurrence, 2008.	most common, by mortality, 2008.
prostate cancer (25%)	lung cancer (31%)	breast cancer (26%)	lung cancer (26%)
lung cancer (15%)	prostate cancer (10%)	lung cancer (14%)	breast cancer (15%)
colorectal cancer (10%)	colorectal cancer (8%)	colorectal cancer (10%)	colorectal cancer (9%)
bladder cancer (7%)	pancreatic cancer (6%)	endometrial cancer (7%)	pancreatic cancer (6%)
non-Hodgkin lymphoma (5%)	liver & intrahepatic bile duct (4%)	non-Hodgkin lymphoma (4%)	ovarian cancer (6%)
skin melanoma (5%)	leukemia (4%)	thyroid cancer (4%)	non-Hodgkin lymphoma (3%)
kidney cancer (4%)	esophageal cancer (4%)	Skin melanoma (4%)	leukemia (3%)
oral and pharyngeal cancer (3%)	bladder cancer (3%)	ovarian cancer (3%)	uterine cancer (3%)
leukemia (3%)	non-Hodgkin lymphoma (3%)	kidney cancer (3%)	liver & intrahepatic bile duct (2%)
pancreatic cancer (3%)	kidney cancer (3%)	leukemia (3%)	brain and other nervous system (2%)
other (20%)	other (24%)	other (22%)	other (25%)

=== Incidence of a second cancer in survivors ===
In 2003, in the developed world, one in three people developed cancer during their lifetimes. If all cancer patients survived and cancer occurred randomly, the normal lifetime odds of developing a second primary cancer (not the first cancer spreading to a new site) would be one in nine. However, cancer survivors have an increased risk of developing a second primary cancer, and the odds in 2003 were about one in 4.5. About half of these second primaries can be attributed to the normal one-in-nine risk associated with random chance.

The increased risk is believed to be primarily due to the same risk factors that produced the first cancer, such as the person's genetic profile, alcohol and tobacco use, obesity, and environmental exposures, and partly due, in some cases, to the treatment for the first cancer, which might have included mutagenic chemotherapeutic drugs or radiation. Cancer survivors may be more likely to comply with recommended screening, and may be more likely than average to detect cancers.

== Children ==
In 2008, childhood cancer and cancer in adolescents was rare, at about 150 cases per million yearly in the US. In 2008, leukemia, usually acute lymphoblastic leukemia, was the most common cancer in children aged 1–14 in the U.S., followed by the central nervous system cancers, neuroblastoma, Wilms' tumor, and non-Hodgkin's lymphoma. Childhood cancers increased 19% between 1975 and 1990, mainly due to an increased incidence in acute leukemia. Since 1990, incidence rates have decreased.

== Infants ==
The age of peak incidence of cancer in children occurs during the first year of life, in infants. The average annual incidence in the United States, 1975–1995, was 233 per million infants. Several estimates of incidence exist. According to SEER, in the United States in 1999:

- Neuroblastoma comprised 28% of infant cancer cases and was the most common malignancy among these young children, at 65 cases per million infants.
- The leukemias as a group, at 41 per million infants, represented the next most common type of cancer, comprising 17% of all cases.
- Central nervous system malignancies comprised 13% of infant cancer, with an average annual incidence rate of nearly 30 per million infants.
- The average annual incidence rates for malignant germ cell and malignant soft tissue tumors were essentially the same, at 15 per million infants. Each comprised about 6% of infant cancer.

Teratoma, a germ cell tumor, is often cited as the most common tumor in this age group, but most teratomas are surgically removed while still benign, hence not necessarily cancer. Prior to the widespread routine use of prenatal ultrasound examinations, the incidence of sacrococcygeal teratomas diagnosed at birth was 25 to 29 per million births.

Female and male infants have essentially the same overall cancer incidence rates, a notable difference compared to older children.

In 1999, White infants had higher cancer rates than Black infants. Leukemias accounted for a substantial proportion of this difference. The average annual rate for white infants, at 48.7 per million, was 66% higher than for black infants, at 29.4 per million.

Relative survival for infants is very good for neuroblastoma, Wilms' tumor and retinoblastoma, and fairly good (80%) for leukemia, but not for most other types of cancer.

== See also ==
- List of countries by cancer rate
- Epidemiology of breast cancer
- Incidentaloma, a symptom-free tumor that is found accidentally and whose treatment may be unimportant

General:

- Cancer cluster
- Cancer research
- Genetic epidemiology
