= Selection bias =

Bias in a statistical analysis due to non-random selection

Selection bias is the bias introduced by the selection of individuals, groups, or data for analysis in such a way that the association between exposure and outcome among those selected for analysis differs from the association among those eligible. It typically occurs when researchers condition on a factor that is influenced both by the exposure and the outcome (or their causes), creating a false association between them. Selection bias encompasses several forms of bias, including differential loss-to-follow-up, incidence–prevalence bias, volunteer bias, healthy-worker bias, and nonresponse bias.

== Types of bias ==
=== Sampling bias ===
Selection bias illustration by fish and net with large holes

Sampling bias is systematic error due to a non-random sample of a population, causing some members of the population to be less likely to be included than others, resulting in a biased sample, defined as a statistical sample of a population (or non-human factors) in which all participants are not representative of the entire population due to factors beyond random chance. It is mostly classified as a subtype of selection bias, sometimes specifically termed sample selection bias, but some classify it as a separate type of bias.

A distinction of sampling bias (albeit not a universally accepted one) is that it undermines the external validity of a test (the ability of its results to be generalized to the rest of the population), while selection bias mainly addresses internal validity for differences or similarities found in the sample at hand. In this sense, errors occurring in the process of gathering the sample or cohort cause sampling bias, while errors in any process thereafter cause selection bias.

Examples of sampling bias include self-selection, pre-screening of trial participants, discounting trial subjects/tests that did not run to completion and migration bias by excluding subjects who have recently moved into or out of the study area, length-time bias, where slowly developing disease with better prognosis is detected, and lead time bias, where disease is diagnosed earlier for participants than in comparison populations, although the average course of disease is the same.

=== Time interval ===
- Early termination of a trial at a time when its results support the desired conclusion.
- A trial may be terminated early at an extreme value (often for ethical reasons), but the extreme value is likely to be reached by the variable with the largest variance, even if all variables have a similar mean.

=== Exposure ===
- Susceptibility bias
  - Clinical susceptibility bias, when one disease predisposes for a second disease, and the treatment for the first disease erroneously appears to predispose to the second disease. For example, postmenopausal syndrome gives a higher likelihood of also developing endometrial cancer, so estrogens given for the postmenopausal syndrome may receive a higher than actual blame for causing endometrial cancer.
  - Protopathic bias, when a treatment for the first symptoms of a disease or other outcome appear to cause the outcome. It is a potential bias when there is a lag time from the first symptoms and start of treatment before actual diagnosis. It can be mitigated by lagging, that is, exclusion of exposures that occurred in a certain time period before diagnosis.
  - Indication bias, a potential mixup between cause and effect when exposure is dependent on indication, e.g. a treatment is given to people in high risk of acquiring a disease, potentially causing a preponderance of treated people among those acquiring the disease. This may cause an erroneous appearance of the treatment being a cause of the disease.

=== Data ===
- Partitioning (dividing) data with knowledge of the contents of the partitions, and then analyzing them with tests designed for blindly chosen partitions.
- Post hoc alteration of data inclusion based on arbitrary or subjective reasons, including:
  - Cherry picking, which actually is not selection bias, but confirmation bias, when specific subsets of data are chosen to support a conclusion (e.g. citing examples of plane crashes as evidence of airline flight being unsafe, while ignoring the far more common example of flights that complete safely. See: availability heuristic)
  - Rejection of bad data on (1) arbitrary grounds, instead of according to previously stated or generally agreed criteria or (2) discarding "outliers" on statistical grounds that fail to take into account important information that could be derived from "wild" observations.

=== Studies ===
- Selection of which studies to include in a meta-analysis (see also combinatorial meta-analysis).
- Performing repeated experiments and reporting only the most favorable results, perhaps relabelling lab records of other experiments as "calibration tests", "instrumentation errors" or "preliminary surveys".
- Presenting the most significant result of a data dredge as if it were a single experiment (which is logically the same as the previous item, but is seen as much less dishonest).

=== Attrition ===
Attrition bias is a kind of selection bias caused by attrition (loss of participants), discounting trial subjects/tests that did not run to completion. It is closely related to the survivorship bias, where only the subjects that "survived" a process are included in the analysis or the failure bias, where only the subjects that "failed" a process are included. It includes dropout, nonresponse (lower response rate), withdrawal and protocol deviators. It gives biased results where it is unequal in regard to exposure and/or outcome. For example, in a test of a dieting program, the researcher may simply reject everyone who drops out of the trial, but most of those who drop out are those for whom it was not working. Different loss of subjects in intervention and comparison group may change the characteristics of these groups and outcomes irrespective of the studied intervention.

Lost to follow-up, is another form of Attrition bias, mainly occurring in medicinal studies over a lengthy time period. Non-Response or Retention bias can be influenced by a number of both tangible and intangible factors, such as; wealth, education, altruism, initial understanding of the study and its requirements. Researchers may also be incapable of conducting follow-up contact resulting from inadequate identifying information and contact details collected during the initial recruitment and research phase.

=== Observer selection ===
Philosopher Nick Bostrom has argued that data are filtered not only by study design and measurement, but by the necessary precondition that there has to be someone doing a study. In situations where the existence of the observer or the study is correlated with the data, observation selection effects occur, and anthropic reasoning is required.

An example is the past impact event record of Earth: if large impacts cause mass extinctions and ecological disruptions precluding the evolution of intelligent observers for long periods, no one will observe any evidence of large impacts in the recent past (since they would have prevented intelligent observers from evolving). Hence there is a potential bias in the impact record of Earth. Astronomical existential risks might similarly be underestimated due to selection bias, and an anthropic correction has to be introduced.

=== Volunteer bias ===
Self-selection bias or a volunteer bias in studies offer further threats to the validity of a study as these participants may have intrinsically different characteristics from the target population of the study. Studies have shown that volunteers tend to come from a higher social standing than from a lower socio-economic background. Furthermore, another study shows that women are more probable to volunteer for studies than men. Volunteer bias is evident throughout the study life-cycle, from recruitment to follow-ups. More generally speaking volunteer response can be put down to individual altruism, a desire for approval, personal relation to the study topic and other reasons.

=== Malmquist bias ===
Malmquist bias in observational astronomy is a bias caused by the limit of the detector sensitivity. Because the apparent luminosity decreases for the distant objects, at a greater distance, only brighter objects can be observed. This will create the false correlation between the distance and the luminosity.

== Mitigation ==
In the general case, selection biases cannot be overcome with statistical analysis of existing data alone, though Heckman correction may be used in special cases. An assessment of the degree of selection bias can be made by examining correlations between exogenous (background) variables and a treatment indicator. However, in regression models, it is correlation between unobserved determinants of the outcome and unobserved determinants of selection into the sample which bias estimates, and this correlation between unobservables cannot be directly assessed by the observed determinants of treatment.

When data are selected for fitting or forecast purposes, a coalitional game can be set up so that a fitting or forecast accuracy function can be defined on all subsets of the data variables.

== Related issues ==
Selection bias is closely related to:

- Publication bias or reporting bias, the distortion produced in community perception or meta-analyses by not publishing uninteresting (usually negative) results, or results which go against the experimenter's prejudices, a sponsor's interests, or community expectations.
- Confirmation bias, the general tendency of humans to give more attention to whatever confirms our pre-existing perspective; or specifically in experimental science, the distortion produced by experiments that are designed to seek confirmatory evidence instead of trying to disprove the hypothesis.
- Exclusion bias, results from applying different criteria to cases and controls in regards to participation eligibility for a study/different variables serving as basis for exclusion.

== See also ==
- Berkson's paradox – Tendency to misinterpret statistical experiments involving conditional probabilities
- Black swan theory – Theory of response to surprise events
- Cherry picking – Fallacy of incomplete evidence
- Frequency illusion – Kind of cognitive bias
- Funding bias – Tendency of a scientific study to support the interests of its funder
- List of cognitive biases
- Participation bias – Type of bias
- Publication bias – Higher probability of publishing results showing a significant finding
- Reporting bias – Bias in the reporting of information
- Sampling bias – Bias in the sampling of a population
- Sampling probability – Theory relating to sampling from finite populations
- Selective exposure theory – Theory within the practice of psychology
- Self-fulfilling prophecy – Prediction that causes itself to become true
- Survivorship bias – Statistical error resulting from focusing on successes over failures
