= Ilana Gareen =

American epidemiologist

Ilana Francesca Gareen
- Education: University of California, Los Angeles; Vassar College; Yale University
- Scientific career
- Workplaces: Brown University
- Thesis: Three applications in reproductive and perinatal epidemiology : use of intrauterine device and pelvic inflammatory disease : maternal age and cesarean delivery : and neonatal outcomes of cesarean delivery (1997)

Ilana F Gareen is an American epidemiologist who is a professor at Brown University. Her research considers the development and implementation of new imaging technologies. She was co-chair of the National Lung Screening Trial.

== Early life and education ==
Gareen completed her undergraduate degree in bioethics at Vassar College. She moved to Yale University for a Master's in Public Health, where she studied the prevalence of HIV/AIDS in New York City inmates. After her graduate studies, she worked as a research associate at Cornell University, focusing on epidemiology. She earned her doctorate at University of California, Los Angeles, where she investigated reproductive and perinatal epidemiology.

== Research and career ==
Gareen joined Brown University as a research fellow in 1997, was made assistant professor in 1999 and full professor in 2025. She develops strategies for diagnostic imaging, with a focus on patient outcomes and quality of life.

Gareen was co-chair of the National Lung Screening Trial. She looked at how significant incidental finding detection impacted patient morbidity. Her research has shown that 30% of low dose CT scans contain significant incidental findings, and 90% of them were considered reportable. The most common were emphysema, coronary artery calcium and masses. The National Lung Screening Trial demonstrated that screening with low dose CT scans reduced lung cancer mortality compared to chest radiography. CT scans are much more costly than X-rays, but have a better impact on quality of life.

== Selected publications ==
- Denise R Aberle; Amanda M Adams; Christine D Berg; et al. (4 August 2011). "Reduced lung-cancer mortality with low-dose computed tomographic screening". The New England Journal of Medicine. 365 (5): 395–409. doi:10.1056/nejmoa1102873. ISSN 0028-4793. PMC 4356534. PMID 21714641. Wikidata Q28241954.
- William C Black; Ilana F Gareen; Samir S Soneji; et al. (1 November 2014). "Cost-effectiveness of CT screening in the National Lung Screening Trial". The New England Journal of Medicine. 371 (19): 1793–1802. doi:10.1056/nejmoa1312547. ISSN 0028-4793. PMC 4335305. PMID 25372087. Wikidata Q35104187.
- Gil D Rabinovici; Constantine Gatsonis; Charles Apgar; et al. (1 April 2019). "Association of Amyloid Positron Emission Tomography With Subsequent Change in Clinical Management Among Medicare Beneficiaries With Mild Cognitive Impairment or Dementia". JAMA. 321 (13): 1286–1294. doi:10.1001/jama.2019.2000. ISSN 0098-7484. PMC 6450276. PMID 30938796. Wikidata Q92784324.
