= Yu Shen =

Chinese-American biostatistician

Yu Shen is a Chinese and American biostatistician whose research interests include the integration of clinical data with randomized controlled trials, survival analysis, health economics, and cancer screening. She is the Oestmann Family Foundation Chair for Cancer Research in the Department of Biostatistics at the University of Texas MD Anderson Cancer Center.

== Education and career ==
Shen majored in mathematics at East China Normal University, graduating in 1984. After a 1990 master's degree in mathematics from the University of Notre Dame, she completed her Ph.D. in biostatistics in 1994 at the University of Washington. Her doctoral dissertation, Estimation of Survival Distribution in Heterogeneous Samples and Assessment of Treatment Effects, was supervised by Thomas R. Fleming.

After postdoctoral research at the University of Washington and Fred Hutchinson Cancer Center, she has been affiliated with the University of Texas MD Anderson Cancer Center since 1995. She previously held the title of Conversation with a Living Legend Professor, starting in 2014, before taking her present title as Oestmann Family Foundation Chair for Cancer Research. As well as her position at the Anderson Center, she also holds adjunct faculty affiliations at Texas A&M University, Rice University, and the University of Texas Health Science Center at Houston.

== Recognition ==
Shen was elected as a Fellow of the American Statistical Association in 2007. In 2024, she was named a Fellow of the Institute of Mathematical Statistics, "for novel contributions to the methodology of complex survival data analysis, adaptive clinical trial designs, and cancer screening data modeling; for substantial collaboration impacting on the practice of medicine and public health recommendations".
