= Lagging (epidemiology) =

Excluding the exposure shortly before an outcome

In epidemiology, lagging (or exposure lagging) means excluding the exposure in a time period before registration of an outcome. It may be motivated by that the actual outcome had actually occurred before the registration of it, and that the last exposure before registration did not contribute to the case.

For example, when studying risk factors of cancer, the cancer process may have been triggered long before actual diagnosis of cancer, and that therefore any exposure to risk factors in the lag time between may be unimportant.

It can be used to mitigate protopathic bias, that is, when a treatment for the first symptoms of a disease or other outcome appear to cause the outcome. Protopathic bias is a potential bias when there is a lag time from the first symptoms and start of treatment before actual diagnosis.
