= List of countries by cancer rate =

This is a list of countries by cancer rate, as measured variously by the number of new cancer cases (frequency), or death rate (mortality), per 100,000 population among countries, and dependencies.

== Rates of cancer ==
In many developing countries cancer incidence, insofar as this can be measured, appears much lower, most likely because of the higher death rates due to infectious disease or injury. With the increased control over malaria and tuberculosis in some Third World countries, incidence of cancer is expected to rise. This is termed an epidemiologic transition in epidemiological terminology.

== Cancer incidence ==
=== Overall ===
Notes: NMSC = non-melanoma skin cancer. Rates are age-standardised.

Overall global cancer incidence (2022)
Country	Including NMSC		Excluding NMSC	
Country	Number	Rate	Number	Rate
Australia	212,332	462.5	151,529	322.4
New Zealand	38,157	427.3	27,551	299.9
Denmark	48,840	374.7	43,964	349.8
United States	2,380,189	367.0	1,832,550	303.6
Norway	40,305	357.9	37,449	340.3
Canada	292,098	345.9	232,074	292.4
Ireland	31,242	344.7	26,884	307.0
Netherlands	132,319	341.4	116,224	312.4
France	483,568	339.0	435,114	316.6
Hungary	66,340	336.7	62,509	321.2
Belgium	81,132	324.7	72,680	301.7
Croatia	28,809	313.4	27,512	306.1
Sweden	69,261	310.0	61,794	288.9
United Kingdom	454,954	307.8	417,481	290.6
Slovenia	14,402	305.1	13,719	296.0
Portugal	69,567	294.6	66,600	286.3
Switzerland	58,330	292.7	48,153	255.2
Cyprus	6,198	292.3	5,921	283.6
Latvia	11,458	288.9	11,082	280.6
Lithuania	16,413	287.9	16,119	284.8
New Caledonia	1,149	287.6	1,123	281.5
Italy	436,242	284.5	407,240	272.4
Slovakia	30,913	283.3	29,273	271.8
Estonia	8,050	282.5	7,817	277.0
Malta	2,855	282.5	2,738	275.9
Czech Republic	65,676	280.9	61,107	267.5
Uruguay	16,817	279.9	15,664	262.7
Finland	37,660	276.9	35,274	265.9
Romania	104,661	276.5	100,471	267.8
Spain	278,729	274.6	264,528	265.5
Germany	605,805	274.2	529,955	250.4
Luxembourg	3,440	273.3	2,983	245.2
Belarus	46,402	273.2	45,019	266.9
Iceland	1,777	268.3	1,663	255.4
Japan	1,005,157	267.1	992,806	264.8
Poland	208,900	262.8	202,037	256.8
Greece	65,703	258.7	63,176	253.8
Austria	50,682	258.5	45,525	241.7
Guadeloupe	2,123	253.9	2,042	245.1
Serbia	42,039	250.4	40,596	244.3
Russia	635,560	248.1	614,275	240.9
Israel	30,438	245.8	30,234	244.3
Samoa	400	240.0	400	240.0
Montenegro	2,739	238.0	2,510	221.1
Mongolia	6,699	235.8	6,651	234.0
South Korea	237,701	234.7	232,963	230.9
Moldova	14,816	232.2	13,377	212.0
Singapore	25,250	231.1	24,801	227.3
French Polynesia	877	228.1	877	228.1
Puerto Rico	13,778	226.6	13,173	215.7
Turkey	240,013	225.9	231,784	218.6
Martinique	2,057	224.2	1,975	215.6
Bulgaria	32,812	222.0	31,485	215.5
Cuba	49,688	220.8	45,705	204.6
Bosnia and Herzegovina	14,265	218.6	13,765	212.3
Argentina	133,420	215.8	129,689	210.7
Brazil	627,193	214.4	591,660	203.7
Zimbabwe	17,725	208.0	17,312	203.1
North Macedonia	7,563	206.9	7,235	199.7
Barbados	1,120	205.3	1,104	202.2
French Guiana	589	204.3	563	195.5
South Africa	111,321	203.4	100,897	183.6
Réunion	3,015	203.1	3,014	203.0
China	4,824,703	201.6	4,775,419	199.7
Armenia	9,520	201.6	9,397	199.1
Ukraine	155,239	199.9	150,687	195.5
Jamaica	7,500	199.6	7,429	197.7
Georgia	13,689	197.5	13,184	192.2
World	19,976,499	196.9	18,741,966	186.5
Namibia	3,453	193.5	3,222	179.1
Bahamas	955	192.7	937	189.0
Paraguay	13,783	192.2	13,380	186.7
Brunei	925	192.2	902	187.2
Chile	59,876	188.7	57,082	181.5
Papua New Guinea	12,190	188.7	11,491	175.1
Trinidad and Tobago	3,931	186.7	3,918	186.1
Philippines	188,976	185.4	187,806	184.2
Venezuela	62,947	184.8	58,613	173.4
Costa Rica	13,325	177.7	11,817	159.3
Colombia	117,620	177.6	114,573	173.7
Fiji	1,601	174.8	1,593	173.9
Peru	72,827	173.8	69,765	167.7
Suriname	1,119	169.5	1,103	167.0
Lebanon	13,034	168.8	12,690	164.6
Guam	412	167.2	412	167.2
Dominican Republic	20,171	167.0	19,887	164.8
Saint Lucia	448	166.8	448	166.8
Egypt	150,578	166.1	148,639	163.9
North Korea	61,533	166.1	61,212	165.2
Kazakhstan	36,225	162.3	34,116	153.3
Albania	8,019	160.8	7,702	155.5
Malawi	19,846	159.5	19,475	156.3
Zambia	15,296	159.5	15,037	156.9
Panama	8,353	154.9	8,110	151.1
Laos	9,101	154.5	8,993	152.5
Thailand	183,541	154.4	180,337	152.0
Uganda	35,968	154.4	35,539	152.5
Ecuador	30,888	152.7	29,613	147.1
Jordan	12,328	152.6	12,164	150.4
Azerbaijan	18,503	152.3	18,176	149.6
Palestine	5,030	152.3	4,978	150.8
Vietnam	180,480	150.8	179,123	149.7
Morocco	63,609	149.8	63,110	148.7
Kenya	44,726	149.1	44,065	146.9
Iran	137,198	149.0	133,121	144.5
Bolivia	17,579	143.8	16,811	138.7
Guyana	1,225	142.5	1,223	142.3
Malaysia	51,650	142.1	51,133	140.7
Algeria	64,713	141.2	63,306	138.2
Haiti	13,860	141.1	13,753	140.0
Mexico	207,154	140.9	198,533	135.6
Tanzania	44,931	140.1	44,070	137.7
Mauritius	2,888	140.0	2,795	135.8
Mali	15,151	139.9	14,842	137.0
Syria	21,926	138.6	21,505	135.7
Cambodia	19,795	138.3	19,516	136.3
Côte d’Ivoire	21,352	137.0	21,083	135.4
Indonesia	408,661	136.9	400,820	134.2
Iraq	37,382	136.6	36,982	134.9
Myanmar	77,603	135.5	76,043	132.7
Tunisia	20,551	135.4	20,095	132.4
Eswatini	1,108	135.3	1,073	131.2
Solomon Islands	684	134.8	681	134.2
Angola	24,607	133.5	24,085	131.2
Nicaragua	8,409	133.5	8,242	130.8
Libya	8,171	132.3	8,099	131.0
Mozambique	26,578	128.8	25,741	125.0
Burundi	7,997	128.2	7,873	126.2
Honduras	10,815	128.0	10,663	126.2
El Salvador	9,799	127.1	9,600	124.9
Cameroon	19,564	126.0	19,260	124.1
Kyrgyzstan	7,266	125.8	7,040	121.2
Burkina Faso	14,538	125.2	14,308	123.1
Turkmenistan	6,807	122.7	6,561	117.9
Guatemala	17,801	121.8	17,304	118.8
Somalia	10,681	121.0	10,423	118.1
Ghana	27,385	120.4	27,054	119.0
Chad	10,185	118.1	10,141	117.8
Madagascar	21,297	117.4	20,693	114.5
Guinea	8,777	116.3	8,558	113.5
Lesotho	2,027	115.5	1,969	112.1
Botswana	2,317	115.4	2,222	110.6
Liberia	3,873	115.2	3,796	113.0
Belize	409	114.7	375	105.5
Gabon	1,875	114.4	1,842	112.3
Senegal	11,841	113.9	11,561	111.2
Bahrain	1,383	113.8	1,373	113.1
Nigeria	127,763	113.6	124,735	111.1
Uzbekistan	35,900	112.7	35,498	111.3
Kuwait	4,347	111.4	4,327	110.9
Vanuatu	250	108.2	250	108.2
Togo	5,491	107.5	5,292	104.0
Equatorial Guinea	926	107.7	910	105.8
Sri Lanka	33,243	106.9	32,829	105.6
Comoros	619	106.8	599	104.1
Afghanistan	24,275	106.2	23,750	103.5
Pakistan	185,748	105.6	180,938	102.7
Bangladesh	167,256	105.6	166,093	104.9
Oman	4,045	105.3	3,991	103.7
Mauritania	3,274	105.3	3,202	103.1
Maldives	479	105.3	471	103.0
United Arab Emirates	5,526	105.1	5,445	103.4
Sao Tome and Principe	144	104.9	143	104.2
Ethiopia	80,334	104.5	77,790	101.1
DR Congo	52,612	103.0	52,049	101.9
Benin	7,496	102.6	7,365	101.1
Central African Republic	2,690	101.8	2,656	100.6
Guinea-Bissau	1,170	100.3	1,141	98.0
Eritrea	2,463	99.8	2,403	97.4
South Sudan	6,874	99.4	6,737	97.4
India	1,413,316	98.5	1,401,721	97.7
Sudan	28,586	95.6	28,076	93.9
Tajikistan	6,467	91.7	6,366	90.0
Djibouti	805	90.7	787	88.7
Bhutan	638	87.6	630	86.5
Saudi Arabia	28,113	87.1	27,768	85.8
Cape Verde	435	87.0	423	84.5
Timor-Leste	828	84.5	820	83.5
Niger	11,593	83.7	11,263	81.3
Rwanda	7,122	83.2	6,966	81.4
Yemen	16,525	83.1	16,260	81.5
Qatar	1,733	82.4	1,719	81.7
Nepal	22,008	81.6	21,766	80.7
Congo	2,727	80.7	2,717	80.5
The Gambia	1,196	79.2	1,192	78.9
Sierra Leone	1,918	35.9	1,915	35.9

=== Male and female ===
Global cancer incidence in males and females (2022)
Country	Male				Female			
Country	Including NMSC		Excluding NMSC		Including NMSC		Excluding NMSC	
Country	Number	Rate	Number	Rate	Number	Rate	Number	Rate
Australia	116,363	514.3	80,960	344.4	95,969	415.2	70,569	303.8
New Zealand	20,562	473.4	14,766	325.4	17,595	386.3	12,785	277.3
United States	1,283,898	401.7	930,417	312.1	1,096,291	341.7	902,133	299.6
Hungary	34,250	395.9	32,450	377.2	32,090	298.8	30,059	285.5
Denmark	25,826	394.0	23,038	363.4	23,014	361.2	20,926	340.8
Lithuania	9,245	391.3	9,091	386.4	7,168	224.0	7,028	221.9
Ireland	17,252	386.9	14,407	333.2	13,990	307.5	12,477	283.5
France	263,339	386.4	234,479	355.1	220,229	301.0	200,635	285.5
Norway	21,733	383.6	20,189	362.7	18,572	337.6	17,260	322.5
Croatia	15,607	367.3	14,957	356.8	13,202	277.0	12,555	271.4
Canada	153,660	365.9	119,086	298.6	138,438	441.8	112,988	289.8
Latvia	5,908	364.0	5,754	354.9	5,550	249.4	5,328	241.4
Belarus	24,933	360.5	24,321	351.9	21,469	223.6	20,698	218.5
Estonia	4,214	356.4	4,091	347.9	3,836	237.9	3,726	234.4
Netherlands	69,570	350.8	60,845	317.4	62,749	336.2	55,379	310.6
Belgium	43,645	350.8	38,869	322.0	37,487	306.6	33,811	287.9
Slovakia	16,698	346.8	15,956	332.8	14,215	238.0	13,317	228.6
Slovenia	7,838	343.7	7,463	331.3	6,564	275.5	6,256	268.9
Portugal	37,865	342.7	36,152	331.0	31,702	258.5	30,448	252.6
Guadeloupe	1,312	340.2	1,271	328.5	811	184.2	771	177.7
Sweden	37,869	334.8	33,658	309.3	31,392	289.1	28,136	271.4
Romania	57,311	330.8	54,859	318.5	47,350	238.1	45,612	232.3
Switzerland	31,996	329.9	26,188	282.9	26,334	260.2	21,965	230.8
United Kingdom	242,245	327.7	217,526	302.7	212,709	292.5	199,955	281.9
New Caledonia	631	325.3	616	317.9	518	256.9	507	252.1
Uruguay	8,579	322.3	7,919	299.1	8,238	253.2	7,745	240.2
Spain	158,410	319.9	149,854	307.1	120,319	238.0	114,674	232.1
Czech Republic	35,033	317.5	32,448	299.5	30,643	254.9	28,659	244.6
Italy	232,150	312.1	213,092	293.8	204,092	264.1	194,148	256.8
Japan	580,535	309.8	573,914	306.9	424,622	234.2	418,892	232.5
Poland	109,365	307.0	106,060	299.1	99,535	233.6	95,977	229.1
Germany	323,545	306.5	278,113	274.7	282,260	249.0	251,842	231.2
Malta	1,529	299.8	1,444	288.9	1,326	271.6	1,294	268.0
Moldova	7,985	295.3	7,329	271.8	6,831	189.4	6,048	172.3
Greece	36,564	295.0	35,194	289.0	29,139	231.3	27,982	227.2
Finland	19,737	294.9	18,471	281.4	17,923	266.7	16,803	257.5
Serbia	22,910	289.9	22,062	281.1	19,129	219.6	18,534	215.7
Cyprus	3,070	289.9	2,926	279.3	3,128	300.1	2,995	292.9
Russia	301,496	288.5	292,425	280.2	334,064	230.8	321,850	224.3
Austria	27,321	287.6	24,442	265.3	23,361	235.7	21,083	223.5
Luxembourg	1,742	285.8	1,510	253.9	1,698	267.2	1,473	242.1
Mongolia	3,499	280.4	3,479	278.7	3,200	202.0	3,172	200.1
Turkey	132,476	273.7	127,227	263.1	107,537	192.2	104,557	187.5
Iceland	909	271.7	847	257.2	868	266.8	816	255.0
Martinique	1,175	266.9	1,137	258.0	882	189.5	838	181.1
Puerto Rico	7,486	266.6	7,170	254.2	6,292	199.7	6,003	189.8
Montenegro	1,415	261.9	1,282	239.6	1,324	221.1	1,228	208.3
Armenia	5,046	257.5	4,984	254.4	4,474	163.9	4,413	161.9
Bulgaria	17,515	253.9	16,812	245.6	15,297	203.2	14,673	198.0
South Korea	128,045	252.5	126,189	249.0	109,656	228.5	106,774	224.6
Bosnia and Herzegovina	7,841	251.7	7,575	243.9	6,424	194.2	6,190	189.2
French Guiana	341	250.5	325	239.3	248	163.6	238	157.2
Israel	14,746	250.3	14,646	248.7	15,692	244.1	15,588	242.7
Réunion	1,770	248.7	1,770	248.7	1,245	163.9	1,244	163.8
Cuba	26,892	247.4	24,558	226.8	22,796	199.1	21,147	187.0
French Polynesia	477	247.1	477	247.1	400	211.2	400	211.2
Georgia	7,253	246.8	6,996	239.2	6,436	165.5	6,188	161.6
Samoa	191	242.1	191	242.1	209	246.3	209	246.3
Brazil	319,711	240.1	298,124	224.7	307,482	197.6	293,536	190.5
North Macedonia	4,259	239.8	4,011	227.8	3,304	180.5	3,224	177.4
Ukraine	75,825	236.4	73,902	231.0	79,414	182.1	76,785	178.3
Singapore	13,342	235.9	13,070	231.2	11,908	231.0	11,731	228.2
South Africa	52,379	232.4	46,446	204.5	58,942	190.4	54,451	175.8
Argentina	65,040	231.8	62,734	224.2	68,380	208.7	66,955	205.4
Barbados	578	224.5	568	219.7	542	190.7	536	189.2
Chile	32,800	221.7	31,026	210.9	27,076	165.1	26,056	160.6
Namibia	1,540	221.4	1,404	199.4	1,913	183.1	1,818	173.5
Bahamas	477	214.4	465	208.7	478	177.6	472	175.7
World	10,311,610	212.6	9,566,825	198.6	9,664,889	186.3	9,175,144	178.9
China	2,533,906	209.6	2,510,278	207.7	2,290,797	197.0	2,265,141	195.2
Zimbabwe	6,505	202.5	6,334	197.4	11,220	220.5	10,978	215.7
Jamaica	3,713	202.5	3,674	200.3	3,787	197.4	3,755	195.8
Venezuela	31,374	201.6	28,836	185.7	31,573	174.5	29,777	166.5
Paraguay	6,966	199.8	6,710	192.4	6,817	187.6	6,670	183.9
Saint Lucia	265	199.3	265	199.3	183	136.6	183	136.6
Trinidad and Tobago	1,969	195.5	1,961	194.6	1,962	182.1	1,957	181.7
Suriname	571	195.0	563	192.4	548	154.8	540	152.5
North Korea	29,398	187.5	29,255	186.6	32,135	155.0	31,957	154.2
Dominican Republic	10,735	186.7	10,593	184.4	9,436	150.5	9,294	148.3
Costa Rica	6,808	185.5	5,954	162.6	6,517	173.5	5,863	159.3
Guam	221	185.0	221	185.0	191	155.6	191	155.6
Philippines	83,064	184.6	82,394	183.1	105,912	192.5	105,412	191.6
Kazakhstan	16,947	184.4	16,207	176.1	19,278	152.2	17,909	142.6
Colombia	56,224	183.3	54,462	178.0	61,396	175.3	60,111	172.3
Papua New Guinea	5,389	181.7	5,021	166.6	6,801	197.8	6,470	185.6
Azerbaijan	9,901	181.2	9,685	177.4	8,602	131.8	8,491	130.0
Vietnam	95,358	177.1	94,680	175.9	85,122	132.3	84,443	131.4
Albania	4,587	176.9	4,396	170.3	3,432	147.7	3,306	143.5
Egypt	73,611	175.1	72,519	172.4	76,967	161.1	76,120	159.3
Brunei	396	171.7	383	165.9	529	216.0	519	211.6
Lebanon	6,593	170.8	6,368	165.0	6,441	170.2	6,322	167.3
Iran	76,441	168.4	73,512	162.0	60,757	129.1	59,609	126.6
Laos	4,579	167.9	4,527	166.0	4,522	143.9	4,466	142.0
Palestine	2,506	165.5	2,472	163.6	2,524	142.6	2,506	141.6
Peru	33,724	164.6	32,090	157.4	39,103	185.7	37,675	180.5
Zambia	6,433	162.6	6,295	159.5	8,863	164.8	8,742	162.6
Thailand	90,333	161.6	88,596	158.7	93,208	150.6	91,741	148.6
Haiti	7,028	161.3	6,979	160.2	6,832	127.8	6,774	126.7
Tunisia	11,441	159.4	11,176	155.8	9,110	115.3	8,919	113.1
Panama	4,156	158.3	4,029	154.0	4,197	154.3	4,081	151.0
Uganda	15,459	156.2	15,265	154.5	20,509	157.7	20,274	155.8
Cambodia	9,171	152.9	9,019	150.3	10,624	130.0	10,497	128.4
Morocco	30,737	150.8	30,478	149.5	32,872	150.3	32,632	149.2
Libya	4,070	150.8	4,023	149.0	4,101	120.1	4,076	119.3
Fiji	654	150.3	649	149.0	947	201.1	944	200.4
Jordan	5,694	149.9	5,601	147.3	6,634	157.6	6,563	155.7
Chad	5,605	147.4	5,582	147.0	4,580	94.4	4,559	94.1
Myanmar	35,822	147.2	35,019	143.7	41,781	129.8	41,024	127.4
Ecuador	13,890	143.3	13,245	137.0	16,998	163.5	16,368	158.4
Kyrgyzstan	3,371	143.3	3,284	138.3	3,895	117.6	3,756	113.5
Syria	10,179	142.7	9,889	138.5	11,747	136.9	11,616	135.3
Mexico	95,954	141.3	90,818	134.1	111,200	141.8	107,715	138.1
Malaysia	24,892	137.9	24,568	136.1	26,758	148.0	26,565	147.0
Nicaragua	3,763	136.4	3,646	132.0	4,646	133.7	4,596	132.4
Indonesia	188,395	135.5	184,093	132.2	220,266	141.6	216,727	139.3
Malawi	7,415	135.0	7,243	131.4	12,431	184.9	12,232	181.8
Kenya	16,349	133.1	16,031	130.7	28,377	168.1	28,034	166.0
Tanzania	18,215	132.8	17,890	130.9	26,716	151.1	26,180	148.3
Angola	10,684	132.3	10,351	129.3	13,923	137.3	13,734	135.7
Iraq	15,824	132.0	15,603	130.0	21,558	144.1	21,379	142.7
Honduras	5,051	131.2	4,968	129.0	5,764	127.7	5,695	126.2
Algeria	29,387	130.6	28,561	127.1	35,326	152.2	34,745	149.8
Guyana	537	130.1	535	129.7	688	157.7	688	157.7
Côte d’Ivoire	9,795	130.0	9,673	128.6	11,557	143.7	11,410	142.1
Mauritius	1,269	130.0	1,219	125.0	1,619	152.6	1,576	149.0
Bolivia	7,692	129.6	7,331	124.2	9,887	159.4	9,480	154.6
Turkmenistan	3,047	128.8	2,940	123.8	3,760	121.4	3,621	116.7
El Salvador	4,205	126.5	4,118	124.1	5,594	128.4	5,482	126.3
Sao Tome and Principe	77	124.5	76	123.1	67	90.3	67	90.3
Burundi	3,370	123.5	3,317	121.7	4,627	134.6	4,556	132.5
Bangladesh	94,922	120.8	94,208	119.9	72,334	89.5	71,885	89.0
Guatemala	7,783	119.6	7,562	116.5	10,018	124.7	9,742	121.8
Mozambique	10,219	115.4	9,879	111.9	16,359	141.4	15,862	137.5
Solomon Islands	279	114.8	277	114.0	405	154.4	404	154.1
Botswana	941	114.1	893	108.4	1,376	119.4	1,329	115.3
Mali	5,554	113.9	5,409	111.0	9,597	164.5	9,433	161.6
Cameroon	7,986	113.3	7,825	111.2	11,578	139.9	11,435	138.2
Uzbekistan	16,035	112.9	15,813	111.2	19,865	114.6	19,685	113.5
Burkina Faso	5,556	112.5	5,498	111.6	8,982	138.5	8,810	135.6
Oman	2,473	111.5	2,436	109.8	1,572	107.0	1,555	105.6
Sri Lanka	15,733	110.6	15,491	108.8	17,510	106.0	17,338	105.1
Belize	188	110.1	169	99.5	221	118.2	206	110.3
Guinea	3,155	108.9	3,050	105.9	5,622	124.0	5,508	121.3
Cape Verde	214	108.6	207	104.5	221	78.3	216	76.8
Benin	3,468	108.2	3,399	106.7	4,028	101.3	3,966	99.7
Lesotho	725	108.1	699	103.1	1,302	130.4	1,270	127.6
Eswatini	344	107.8	332	104.4	764	173.6	741	168.8
Maldives	248	107.1	242	103.7	231	111.3	229	110.2
Ghana	11,398	106.2	11,191	104.6	15,987	135.2	15,863	134.1
Bahrain	654	105.5	646	104.5	729	137.4	727	137.0
Togo	2,396	105.4	2,285	101.6	3,095	111.1	3,007	107.9
Madagascar	8,500	104.9	8,226	102.0	12,797	130.7	12,467	127.7
Afghanistan	11,239	103.6	10,984	100.9	13,036	110.7	12,766	108.0
Liberia	1,548	102.9	1,508	100.6	2,325	128.8	2,288	126.7
DR Congo	23,033	100.1	22,772	99.1	29,579	107.8	29,277	106.8
Pakistan	87,568	99.5	84,755	96.2	98,180	111.8	96,183	109.4
Senegal	4,270	99.0	4,140	96.3	7,571	126.9	7,421	124.2
Kuwait	2,120	97.8	2,108	97.3	2,227	139.1	2,219	138.6
India	691,178	97.1	684,166	96.1	722,138	100.8	717,555	100.2
Central African Republic	1,075	96.7	1,059	95.2	1,615	110.0	1,597	108.8
Gabon	742	96.4	726	94.3	1,133	134.6	1,116	132.6
Somalia	3,998	95.4	3,878	92.5	6,683	145.9	6,545	142.8
Vanuatu	105	94.0	105	94.0	145	121.7	145	121.7
Nigeria	48,096	93.9	46,686	91.5	79,667	133.3	78,049	130.7
Equatorial Guinea	410	93.7	401	91.6	516	128.0	509	126.3
Comoros	237	92.9	227	90.0	382	122.0	372	119.5
Tajikistan	2,949	92.7	2,880	90.1	3,518	92.0	3,486	91.1
Rwanda	3,287	91.7	3,231	90.2	3,835	79.7	3,735	77.6
Mauritania	1,266	91.4	1,230	89.2	2,008	120.0	1,972	117.7
Bhutan	356	90.5	350	88.8	282	84.5	280	83.9
South Sudan	2,857	89.8	2,794	87.8	4,017	109.7	3,943	107.7
Guinea-Bissau	428	87.4	415	85.4	742	112.7	726	110.3
United Arab Emirates	2,607	86.4	2,552	84.5	2,919	157.8	2,893	156.4
Congo	1,171	84.2	1,168	84.0	1,556	82.3	1,549	82.0
Nepal	9,792	81.6	9,684	80.7	12,216	80.7	12,082	79.8
Saudi Arabia	14,745	81.0	14,535	79.7	13,368	100.4	13,233	99.2
East Timor	373	80.8	369	79.9	455	89.6	451	88.7
Sudan	11,326	80.6	11,079	78.7	17,260	109.7	16,997	108.1
Eritrea	910	78.7	883	76.3	1,553	119.7	1,520	117.1
Yemen	7,213	77.8	7,053	75.7	9,312	89.2	9,207	88.0
Ethiopia	27,713	75.8	26,588	72.7	52,621	131.8	51,202	128.1
Gambia	520	74.7	518	74.4	676	83.1	674	82.8
Niger	4,910	74.2	4,745	71.7	6,683	92.8	6,518	90.5
Djibouti	311	71.6	302	69.6	494	111.3	485	109.2
Qatar	1,093	70.7	1,085	70.2	640	119.7	634	118.5
Sierra Leone	874	39.3	873	39.3	1,044	34.7	1,042	34.7

== Cancer mortality ==
=== Overall ===
Overall global cancer mortality (2022)
Country	Including NMSC		Excluding NMSC	
Country	Number	Rate	Number	Rate
Mongolia	4,929	181.5	4,923	181.3
Zimbabwe	11,739	144.0	11,599	142.1
Hungary	32,482	143.7	32,245	142.9
Poland	119,992	133.1	118,982	132.4
Romania	56,216	132.5	55,627	131.5
Serbia	23,881	128.4	23,646	127.5
Uruguay	8,980	128.3	8,933	127.8
Samoa	208	126.3	208	126.3
Slovakia	15,166	125.7	15,043	124.9
Croatia	13,854	125.7	13,737	125.1
Lithuania	8,349	125.0	8,294	124.5
Belarus	22,644	123.5	22,529	123.0
Latvia	5,872	122.9	5,808	122.1
Moldova	8,148	122.8	8,099	122.1
South Africa	64,547	122.5	63,646	120.8
French Polynesia	481	122.3	481	122.3
Montenegro	1,535	121.4	1,521	120.6
Papua New Guinea	7,200	119.8	6,933	114.3
Malawi	13,979	117.9	13,802	116.0
Slovenia	6,898	116.7	6,836	116.0
Armenia	5,861	116.7	5,824	116.1
Jamaica	4,632	116.6	4,623	116.4
Turkey	129,672	116.1	129,099	115.6
Bosnia and Herzegovina	8,590	116.1	8,512	115.2
Estonia	4,086	114.4	4,049	113.8
Bulgaria	18,794	114.2	18,623	113.4
North Korea	42,789	113.9	42,644	113.5
Uganda	24,629	113.9	24,440	112.9
Barbados	738	113.3	737	113.2
New Caledonia	467	113.2	466	113.0
Namibia	1,940	113.0	1,873	108.4
Philippines	113,369	112.9	112,831	112.4
North Macedonia	4,364	112.5	4,312	111.4
Georgia	8,459	111.7	8,238	109.6
Cyprus	2,837	111.5	2,806	110.6
Singapore	13,277	110.8	13,248	110.5
Russia	311,729	110.5	310,160	110.0
Cuba	27,724	110.2	27,304	108.9
Laos	6,215	109.9	6,176	109.1
Zambia	9,770	109.2	9,694	108.2
Bahamas	552	109.2	552	109.2
Portugal	33,762	109.0	33,503	108.4
Egypt	95,275	107.7	94,069	106.3
France	190,612	106.7	189,466	106.3
Denmark	17,204	106.5	17,111	106.1
Brunei	464	104.6	464	104.6
Kenya	29,317	104.0	29,091	103.2
Czech Republic	28,071	103.8	27,882	103.2
Netherlands	49,790	103.2	49,653	103.0
Argentina	70,251	102.7	69,824	102.2
Mali	10,678	102.4	10,541	100.9
Ukraine	84,153	101.1	83,582	100.6
Guam	267	101.1	267	101.1
Greece	32,385	100.6	32,223	100.3
New Zealand	11,301	100.2	11,111	99.0
Germany	253,170	99.7	251,875	99.4
Cambodia	13,799	99.3	13,682	98.4
Vietnam	120,184	99.0	119,694	98.7
Ireland	10,438	98.7	10,310	97.7
Burundi	5,760	98.7	5,707	97.6
Burkina Faso	10,998	98.5	10,903	97.4
Fiji	865	98.5	863	98.0
United Kingdom	181,807	98.3	180,294	97.6
Palestine	3,011	98.0	2,995	97.4
Myanmar	54,841	97.1	54,218	95.9
Tanzania	29,743	97.1	29,467	96.2
Trinidad and Tobago	2,221	96.8	2,216	96.7
China	2,574,176	96.5	2,560,612	96.0
Iran	87,247	96.5	86,711	95.9
Canada	100,465	96.4	99,555	95.7
Mozambique	19,020	96.3	18,723	94.5
Somalia	8,038	95.5	7,886	93.6
Réunion	1,580	95.2	1,579	95.2
Italy	193,706	94.2	192,227	93.7
Côte d’Ivoire	14,143	93.6	14,043	92.9
Thailand	118,829	93.4	117,760	92.6
Azerbaijan	11,314	93.2	11,226	92.5
Guadeloupe	952	93.0	951	93.0
Belgium	29,005	92.4	28,875	92.1
Lebanon	7,307	92.3	7,178	90.8
Haiti	9,014	92.2	8,972	91.8
Kazakhstan	20,686	92.1	20,534	91.5
Dominican Republic	11,744	92.0	11,653	91.4
Norway	13,393	91.8	13,323	91.5
World	9,743,832	91.7	9,674,416	91.1
Suriname	626	91.5	626	91.5
Brazil	278,835	91.3	275,762	90.4
Venezuela	31,737	91.3	31,072	89.5
Austria	22,381	91.3	22,206	90.9
Libya	5,316	91.1	5,291	90.6
Syria	13,848	91.0	13,647	89.6
Albania	4,955	90.5	4,900	89.8
Chile	31,440	90.1	31,154	89.5
Angola	15,541	90.0	15,446	89.5
Paraguay	6,581	89.9	6,497	88.9
Spain	115,590	88.8	114,808	88.4
Eswatini	697	88.8	686	87.1
Guinea	6,363	87.5	6,271	86.2
Cameroon	12,798	87.3	12,686	86.5
Malaysia	31,633	86.3	31,420	85.7
Chad	7,257	86.2	7,248	86.1
Morocco	36,947	85.9	36,754	85.5
Sweden	25,569	85.2	25,461	85.0
Bolivia	11,015	85.1	10,908	84.4
Australia	51,884	84.6	51,126	83.6
Iraq	21,536	84.4	21,428	83.9
Jordan	6,458	84.3	6,412	83.6
Liberia	2,730	84.0	2,699	82.9
Madagascar	14,270	83.6	14,034	82.2
Honduras	7,011	83.3	6,965	82.7
Israel	12,855	83.2	12,715	82.6
Iceland	669	83.2	669	83.2
Kyrgyzstan	4,672	82.8	4,622	81.8
Ghana	17,944	82.6	17,838	82.1
French Guiana	233	82.6	233	82.6
Indonesia	242,988	82.5	240,537	81.7
Turkmenistan	4,456	82.5	4,420	81.8
Peru	35,934	82.4	35,550	81.6
United States	605,761	82.3	600,970	81.8
Lesotho	1,411	82.0	1,389	80.6
Senegal	8,134	81.6	8,025	80.4
Malta	1,036	81.6	1,033	81.4
Colombia	56,719	81.4	56,048	80.6
Tunisia	12,580	80.2	12,450	79.4
Central African Republic	2,023	79.9	2,003	79.0
Finland	13,445	79.8	13,389	79.6
Martinique	886	79.3	885	79.3
Switzerland	19,420	78.8	19,266	78.4
Afghanistan	16,923	78.7	16,712	77.5
Japan	426,278	78.6	425,025	78.5
Algeria	35,778	77.7	35,347	76.8
Luxembourg	1,093	77.3	1,089	77.1
South Korea	97,615	77.0	97,268	76.8
Nicaragua	4,822	76.8	4,782	76.1
Guinea-Bissau	849	76.5	838	75.3
South Sudan	5,081	76.3	5,010	75.1
DR Congo	37,575	76.2	37,318	75.6
Saint Lucia	223	76.1	223	76.1
Ecuador	16,158	76.0	15,903	74.9
Costa Rica	6,072	75.3	5,994	74.5
Comoros	418	75.3	416	74.9
Puerto Rico	5,796	75.0	5,746	74.5
Mauritania	2,234	74.8	2,207	73.8
Bangladesh	116,598	74.7	116,062	74.3
Nigeria	79,542	74.6	78,311	73.4
Solomon Islands	365	74.6	365	74.6
Ethiopia	54,698	74.5	53,461	72.6
Togo	3,605	74.0	3,527	72.3
Eritrea	1,724	72.5	1,697	71.3
Equatorial Guinea	589	72.1	583	71.2
Benin	5,069	71.6	5,018	70.9
Uzbekistan	22,071	71.5	21,928	71.0
Guatemala	10,369	71.1	10,207	70.1
Guyana	612	70.2	612	70.2
Pakistan	118,631	69.8	116,294	68.4
Gabon	1,094	69.5	1,088	69.0
Sao Tome and Principe	90	68.0	90	68.0
Vanuatu	151	67.8	151	67.8
Bhutan	480	67.2	478	66.8
Djibouti	572	66.7	564	65.7
Mauritius	1,469	66.6	1,469	66.6
Oman	2,261	66.3	2,249	65.8
Niger	8,806	66.1	8,628	64.7
Botswana	1,277	66.1	1,258	65.0
Panama	3,770	65.7	3,740	65.3
El Salvador	5,292	64.7	5,239	64.2
India	916,827	64.4	911,793	64.0
Sudan	18,504	64.4	18,216	63.3
Tajikistan	4,225	63.9	4,203	63.5
Yemen	11,854	63.7	11,726	62.9
Mexico	96,210	63.5	95,165	62.9
Gambia	899	62.7	899	62.7
Kuwait	1,968	60.2	1,967	60.1
Belize	211	59.9	211	59.9
Rwanda	4,887	59.4	4,833	58.7
Sri Lanka	19,145	59.0	18,992	58.5
Maldives	241	58.8	241	58.8
Bahrain	607	58.6	607	58.6
Cape Verde	285	58.3	285	58.3
East Timor	517	55.4	517	55.4
Nepal	14,704	55.3	14,600	54.9
United Arab Emirates	2,283	54.4	2,264	53.9
Congo	1,732	52.9	1,729	52.8
Saudi Arabia	13,399	46.2	13,312	45.8
Qatar	782	46.2	781	46.1
Sierra Leone	1,334	25.5	1,334	25.5

=== Male and female ===
Global cancer mortality in males and females (2022)
Country	Male				Female			
Country	Including NMSC		Excluding NMSC		Including NMSC		Excluding NMSC	
Country	Number	Rate	Number	Rate	Number	Rate	Number	Rate
Mongolia	2,719	227.5	2,717	227.3	2,210	145.5	2,206	145.2
Belarus	13,564	192.7	13,508	191.9	9,080	79.4	9,021	79.1
Hungary	17,355	187.9	17,237	186.8	15,127	112.2	15,008	111.6
Lithuania	4,639	181.6	4,615	180.9	3,710	88.7	3,679	88.4
Romania	32,830	179.0	32,475	177.4	23,386	96.1	23,152	95.5
Latvia	3,160	178.5	3,130	177.1	2,712	89.5	2,678	89.0
Moldova	4,847	177.5	4,820	176.5	3,301	84.7	3,279	84.3
Poland	65,742	172.8	65,245	171.8	54,250	104.3	53,737	103.8
Croatia	8,129	172.0	8,079	171.2	5,725	91.9	5,658	91.4
Turkey	82,446	168.3	82,146	167.7	47,226	75.8	46,953	75.5
Uruguay	4,920	168.1	4,888	167.2	4,060	101.4	4,045	101.3
Slovakia	8,393	166.9	8,339	165.9	6,773	95.9	6,704	95.3
Estonia	2,201	164.7	2,187	163.9	1,885	82.9	1,862	82.4
Serbia	13,570	161.0	13,436	159.7	10,311	101.9	10,210	101.3
Armenia	3,244	160.3	3,227	159.5	2,617	87.0	2,597	86.5
Russia	164,172	153.0	163,399	152.3	147,557	84.9	146,761	84.6
French Polynesia	296	152.0	296	152.0	185	94.2	185	94.2
Georgia	4,636	151.7	4,511	148.3	3,823	84.5	3,727	83.2
Bosnia and Herzegovina	5,051	151.2	5,008	150.1	3,539	87.9	3,504	87.3
Montenegro	847	149.7	840	148.6	688	98.8	681	98.2
Portugal	19,510	148.8	19,382	148.1	14,252	77.5	14,121	77.1
Bulgaria	10,763	148.8	10,659	147.7	8,031	88.0	7,964	87.5
Slovenia	3,876	147.3	3,844	146.3	3,022	92.6	2,992	92.1
South Africa	30,653	146.3	30,098	143.6	33,894	110.6	33,548	109.4
Samoa	111	144.7	111	144.7	97	113.7	97	113.7
Ukraine	47,415	144.4	47,126	143.6	36,738	73.7	36,456	73.3
North Korea	22,385	143.2	22,321	142.8	20,404	93.9	20,323	93.5
North Macedonia	2,607	143.1	2,571	141.3	1,757	86.2	1,741	85.6
Zimbabwe	4,376	142.3	4,320	140.2	7,363	150.9	7,279	149.0
New Caledonia	273	139.8	272	139.5	194	90.8	194	90.8
France	106,921	135.7	106,262	135.1	83,691	82.8	83,204	82.5
Cyprus	1,574	134.8	1,550	133.0	1,263	92.6	1,256	92.3
Namibia	897	134.0	856	126.6	1,043	103.4	1,017	100.5
Cuba	15,854	133.1	15,592	131.1	11,870	91.2	11,712	90.3
Laos	3,544	132.9	3,525	132.2	2,671	89.4	2,651	88.6
Vietnam	71,385	132.6	71,141	132.2	48,799	72.7	48,553	72.4
Singapore	7,659	131.4	7,643	131.1	5,618	92.9	5,605	92.6
Czech Republic	15,488	129.9	15,370	129.1	12,583	82.8	12,512	82.5
Greece	19,120	129.7	19,020	129.3	13,265	76.4	13,203	76.3
Philippines	56,863	129.3	56,557	128.6	56,506	102.0	56,274	101.6
China	1,629,288	127.5	1,622,045	127.0	944,888	67.8	938,567	67.4
Egypt	51,692	127.4	50,988	125.6	43,583	92.2	43,081	91.1
Guam	153	125.8	153	125.8	114	80.9	114	80.9
Réunion	955	125.1	955	125.1	625	70.4	624	70.3
Barbados	381	124.9	381	124.9	357	104.5	356	104.4
Kazakhstan	11,365	123.9	11,287	123.0	9,321	71.6	9,247	71.2
Argentina	36,588	123.6	36,312	122.8	33,663	88.7	33,512	88.4
Jamaica	2,423	122.9	2,417	122.6	2,209	110.6	2,206	110.5
Azerbaijan	6,601	122.8	6,541	121.7	4,713	71.0	4,685	70.6
Cambodia	7,150	121.9	7,085	120.7	6,649	83.4	6,597	82.7
Denmark	9,124	119.7	9,064	119.1	8,080	95.9	8,047	95.7
Guadeloupe	533	119.4	533	119.4	419	73.5	418	73.5
Bahamas	266	119.2	266	119.2	286	103.3	286	103.3
Germany	137,826	118.7	137,070	118.2	115,344	83.9	114,805	83.7
Papua New Guinea	3,274	118.6	3,127	112.2	3,926	122.2	3,806	117.5
Palestine	1,676	117.5	1,663	116.5	1,335	81.5	1,332	81.3
Spain	69,442	117.2	68,969	116.6	46,148	65.3	45,839	65.1
Netherlands	27,172	116.7	27,087	116.4	22,618	92.3	22,566	92.2
Albania	3,049	116.6	3,014	115.5	1,906	66.3	1,886	65.9
Uganda	10,708	116.3	10,619	115.3	13,921	115.5	13,821	114.5
Myanmar	27,518	114.9	27,200	113.5	27,323	85.1	27,018	84.2
Suriname	340	114.8	340	114.8	286	76.1	286	76.1
Libya	2,920	113.6	2,903	113.0	2,396	74.4	2,388	74.1
Italy	103,859	113.3	103,029	112.6	89,847	79.0	89,198	78.6
New Zealand	6,065	112.6	5,939	110.7	5,236	90.0	5,172	89.2
Thailand	65,100	112.4	64,523	111.5	53,729	78.2	53,237	77.6
Belgium	16,045	111.7	15,974	111.3	12,960	76.6	12,901	76.4
United Kingdom	97,129	111.3	96,123	110.3	84,678	87.6	84,171	87.3
Iran	50,713	110.8	50,367	110.1	36,534	81.4	36,344	80.9
Zambia	4,121	110.7	4,077	109.4	5,649	113.1	5,617	112.4
South Korea	61,059	110.6	60,927	110.3	36,556	51.0	36,341	50.8
Canada	52,714	110.4	52,127	109.3	47,751	85.0	47,428	84.6
World	5,427,827	109.8	5,390,596	109.0	4,313,548	76.9	4,283,820	76.4
French Guiana	138	109.7	138	109.7	95	63.6	95	63.6
Austria	12,167	109.5	12,069	108.8	10,214	76.7	10,137	76.4
Ireland	5,463	109.1	5,384	107.6	4,975	90.0	4,926	89.4
Trinidad and Tobago	1,169	109.1	1,166	108.9	1,052	89.1	1,050	89.0
Chile	16,897	107.8	16,727	106.8	14,543	77.6	14,427	77.2
Brazil	146,702	107.7	144,948	106.5	132,133	79.4	130,814	78.8
Tunisia	7,761	106.6	7,680	105.5	4,819	57.5	4,770	57.0
Haiti	4,595	106.2	4,576	105.7	4,419	82.6	4,396	82.1
Kyrgyzstan	2,454	105.9	2,431	104.5	2,218	68.0	2,191	67.2
Brunei	229	105.6	229	105.6	235	104.2	235	104.2
Morocco	21,155	105.0	21,056	104.5	15,792	70.5	15,698	70.1
Venezuela	16,346	104.6	15,964	102.2	15,391	82.5	15,108	81.2
Chad	3,937	104.4	3,932	104.3	3,320	71.7	3,316	71.6
Syria	7,217	103.7	7,077	101.5	6,631	80.5	6,570	79.8
Norway	6,855	102.1	6,826	101.7	6,538	83.5	6,497	83.2
Lebanon	3,950	101.1	3,861	98.9	3,357	85.8	3,317	85.0
Japan	240,823	100.7	240,225	100.5	185,455	61.3	184,800	61.2
Dominican Republic	6,176	100.4	6,131	99.7	5,568	85.8	5,522	85.2
Australia	29,368	100.2	28,848	98.6	22,516	71.2	22,278	70.7
Paraguay	3,532	99.8	3,487	98.6	3,049	81.8	3,010	81.0
Malawi	5,231	98.8	5,148	96.7	8,748	137.0	8,654	135.3
Kenya	11,314	98.4	11,212	97.6	18,003	112.8	17,879	112.0
Tanzania	12,796	97.2	12,702	96.4	16,947	100.1	16,765	98.9
Puerto Rico	3,212	96.1	3,179	95.3	2,584	59.9	2,567	59.7
Malta	570	96.1	568	95.9	466	69.7	465	69.6
Burundi	2,431	95.3	2,409	94.3	3,329	103.4	3,298	102.2
Finland	7,272	95.2	7,238	94.9	6,173	67.8	6,151	67.6
Turkmenistan	2,183	94.6	2,163	93.7	2,273	74.8	2,257	74.3
Jordan	3,453	94.5	3,425	93.6	3,005	75.5	2,987	75.0
Indonesia	128,740	93.9	127,403	92.9	114,248	73.9	113,134	73.1
Martinique	459	93.3	459	93.3	427	68.5	426	68.4
United States	320,641	93.2	317,177	92.3	285,120	73.6	283,793	73.3
Malaysia	16,980	93.1	16,845	92.4	14,653	79.9	14,575	79.5
Israel	6,500	92.9	6,434	92.2	6,355	75.5	6,281	74.9
Sweden	13,208	92.4	13,139	92.0	12,361	80.0	12,322	79.8
Switzerland	10,592	92.3	10,504	91.8	8,828	67.6	8,762	67.3
Iraq	10,403	91.9	10,335	91.2	11,133	79.5	11,093	79.2
Angola	6,998	91.5	6,936	90.7	8,543	90.7	8,510	90.2
Burkina Faso	4,344	91.1	4,327	90.7	6,654	106.7	6,576	105.3
Iceland	349	90.8	349	90.8	320	77.0	320	77.0
Côte d’Ivoire	6,684	90.5	6,627	89.7	7,459	96.8	7,416	96.1
Saint Lucia	132	89.5	132	89.5	91	63.4	91	63.4
Mali	4,209	89.1	4,147	87.7	6,469	115.1	6,394	113.5
Bangladesh	68,591	87.8	68,216	87.3	48,007	60.9	47,846	60.7
Colombia	27,816	87.6	27,440	86.5	28,903	76.9	28,608	76.3
Luxembourg	576	87.4	573	87.0	517	68.9	516	68.8
Mozambique	7,391	87.3	7,244	84.9	11,629	104.8	11,479	103.3
Honduras	3,364	85.5	3,334	84.7	3,647	82.6	3,631	82.3
Guinea	2,432	85.0	2,387	83.4	3,931	90.3	3,884	89.1
Costa Rica	3,246	84.9	3,194	83.7	2,826	67.6	2,800	67.1
Nicaragua	2,306	84.0	2,278	82.9	2,516	72.2	2,504	71.9
Algeria	18,809	82.7	18,543	81.6	16,969	73.1	16,804	72.5
Afghanistan	8,362	81.0	8,258	79.8	8,561	77.5	8,454	76.4
Fiji	324	80.3	323	79.7	541	117.0	540	116.6
Peru	16,790	79.8	16,590	78.9	19,144	86.2	18,960	85.6
Cameroon	5,312	79.7	5,253	78.8	7,486	95.8	7,433	95.0
Bolivia	4,958	79.5	4,904	78.7	6,057	91.2	6,004	90.7
Benin	2,470	79.4	2,444	78.7	2,599	67.6	2,574	66.9
Madagascar	6,048	78.9	5,937	77.3	8,222	89.2	8,097	87.8
Sao Tome and Principe	48	78.6	48	78.6	42	60.1	42	60.1
Somalia	3,104	78.1	3,032	76.1	4,934	112.6	4,854	110.6
Lesotho	507	78.0	496	75.4	904	90.9	893	90.0
Ghana	8,088	77.6	8,022	77.0	9,856	87.8	9,816	87.4
Uzbekistan	10,743	77.5	10,669	77.0	11,328	67.3	11,259	66.9
Liberia	1,137	76.6	1,122	75.6	1,593	91.9	1,577	90.8
Central African Republic	821	76.5	811	75.5	1,202	85.2	1,192	84.4
Ecuador	7,658	75.9	7,537	74.8	8,500	77.1	8,366	76.1
Eswatini	231	75.9	226	74.1	466	110.9	460	109.1
Cape Verde	149	75.7	149	75.7	136	48.8	136	48.8
DR Congo	16,827	75.2	16,700	74.6	20,748	78.6	20,618	78.1
Oman	1,510	75.2	1,501	74.6	751	57.4	748	57.2
Togo	1,623	74.7	1,583	73.1	1,982	74.4	1,944	72.8
Senegal	3,111	74.2	3,063	73.0	5,023	88.1	4,962	86.9
Bhutan	280	72.4	278	71.7	200	61.2	200	61.2
Mauritius	715	71.5	715	71.5	754	63.9	754	63.9
Panama	1,963	71.0	1,947	70.4	1,807	61.9	1,793	61.5
Solomon Islands	166	70.8	166	70.8	199	78.4	199	78.4
Tajikistan	2,149	70.7	2,135	70.2	2,076	58.3	2,068	58.1
Botswana	552	70.2	542	68.9	725	64.8	716	63.9
South Sudan	2,143	69.8	2,109	68.5	2,938	83.3	2,901	82.1
Vanuatu	77	69.8	77	69.8	74	65.2	74	65.2
Pakistan	58,934	68.8	57,456	67.0	59,697	70.8	58,838	69.7
Maldives	150	68.5	150	68.5	91	48.8	91	48.8
Nigeria	32,905	68.4	32,271	67.0	46,637	81.4	46,040	80.3
Guatemala	4,544	68.4	4,465	67.3	5,825	73.6	5,742	72.7
Guinea-Bissau	323	67.9	318	66.8	526	84.3	520	83.2
Sri Lanka	9,820	67.8	9,724	67.1	9,325	52.6	9,268	52.3
Mauritania	908	67.4	896	66.5	1,326	82.6	1,311	81.6
Rwanda	2,324	67.0	2,304	66.4	2,563	55.8	2,529	54.9
India	470,055	66.5	466,780	66.0	446,772	62.6	445,013	62.4
Mexico	46,415	66.5	45,831	65.7	49,795	61.4	49,334	61.0
Comoros	167	65.9	165	65.0	251	85.2	251	85.2
El Salvador	2,290	65.1	2,268	64.5	3,002	64.6	2,971	64.1
Equatorial Guinea	279	64.7	275	63.5	310	82.6	308	81.9
Guyana	271	64.7	271	64.7	341	76.6	341	76.6
Gambia	440	64.4	440	64.4	459	61.0	459	61.0
Yemen	5,515	63.8	5,419	62.5	6,339	64.5	6,307	64.1
Niger	4,048	63.3	3,958	61.8	4,758	69.1	4,670	67.6
Gabon	480	62.8	477	62.3	614	76.8	611	76.3
Belize	106	62.2	106	62.2	105	57.2	105	57.2
Congo	815	59.2	814	59.2	917	50.3	915	50.2
Bahrain	312	59.1	312	59.1	295	62.8	295	62.8
Eritrea	652	59.0	641	57.8	1,072	84.9	1,056	83.6
East Timor	262	59.0	262	59.0	255	53.0	255	53.0
Sudan	8,001	58.7	7,839	57.3	10,503	69.7	10,377	68.8
Nepal	6,936	58.1	6,881	57.6	7,768	52.5	7,719	52.2
Kuwait	1,098	58.0	1,097	58.0	870	65.9	870	65.9
Ethiopia	19,731	56.5	19,200	54.7	34,967	91.4	34,261	89.3
Djibouti	237	56.3	233	55.2	335	78.1	331	77.0
United Arab Emirates	1,283	48.7	1,268	48.1	1,000	70.3	996	70.1
Saudi Arabia	8,050	48.4	7,992	47.9	5,349	45.0	5,320	44.7
Qatar	527	40.2	526	40.1	255	61.8	255	61.8
Sierra Leone	633	27.7	633	27.7	701	24.7	701	24.7

== Cancer frequency ==
This is a list of countries by cancer frequency, as measured by the number of new cancer cases per 100,000 population among countries, based on the 2018 GLOBOCAN statistics and including all cancer types (some earlier statistics excluded non-melanoma skin cancer). The numbers are age standardized and data is only available for 50 countries and territories, the majority in Europe, North America and Oceania. In some cases, there are significant differences between the sexes; for example, while Canada is 11th highest overall, it is 21st in men and 5th in women.

Country	Cancer rate
Australia	468.0
New Zealand	438.1
Ireland	373.7
Hungary	368.1
United States	352.2
Belgium	345.8
France	344.1
Denmark	340.4
Norway	337.8
Netherlands	334.1
Canada	334.0
France (New Caledonia)	324.2
United Kingdom	319.2
South Korea	313.5
Germany	313.1
Switzerland	311.0
Luxembourg	309.3
Serbia	307.9
Slovenia	304.9
Latvia	302.2
Slovakia	297.5
Czech Republic	296.7
Sweden	294.7
Italy	290.6
Croatia	287.2
Lithuania	285.8
Estonia	283.3
Greece	279.8
Spain	272.3
Finland	266.2
Uruguay	263.4
Belarus	260.7
Portugal	259.5
Iceland	257.8
France (Guadeloupe)	254.6
United States (Puerto Rico)	254.5
Moldova	254.2
Poland	253.8
Cyprus	250.8
France (Martinique)	250.8
Malta	249.4
Singapore	248.9
Japan	248.0
Austria	247.7
Barbados	247.5
France (French Guiana)	247.0
Bulgaria	242.8
Lebanon	242.8
France (French Polynesia)	240.6

== See also ==
- Epidemiology of cancer
- List of countries by life expectancy
