= Denise Aberle =

American radiologist and oncologist

Denise R. Aberle
- Occupation: MD

Academic background
- Education: MD, 1979, University of Kansas School of Medicine

Denise R. Aberle is an American radiologist and oncologist. As a professor of radiology in the David Geffen School of Medicine at UCLA and a professor of bioengineering in the UCLA Henry Samueli School of Engineering and Applied Science, Aberle was elected a member of the National Academy of Medicine and Fellow of the American Institute for Medical and Biological Engineering.

== Early life and education ==
Aberle completed her medical degree from the University of Kansas School of Medicine and completed her fellowship at the University of California, San Francisco.

== Career ==
Upon completing her residency and fellowship, Aberle joined the faculty at the David Geffen School of Medicine at UCLA. While working there, she was also named to lead the National Lung Screening Trial (NLST) in 2011. Her research team found that administering CT scans for high-risk patients saved their lives, pushing for more support for CT scans for bladder cancer survivors. She followed this up by publishing the first annual screening examinations NLST in 2013, showing that low-dose CT scans could detect early-stage lung cancer at a faster rate than chest X-ray. In recognition of her work with the NLST, she received the 2014 Clinical Research Achievement Award from Clinical Research Forum.

As a professor of radiology in the David Geffen School of Medicine at UCLA and a professor of bioengineering in the UCLA Henry Samueli School of Engineering and Applied Science, Aberle was the principal investigator of a project to develop liquid biopsy tools for testing individuals who could have lung cancer. In recognition of her work, she was also elected a Fellow of the American Institute for Medical and Biological Engineering.

In 2019, Aberle was elected a member of the National Academy of Medicine for "leading the American College of Radiology Imaging Network in the National Cancer Institute–sponsored National Lung Screening Trial, in which low-dose CT screening was shown to reduce mortality from lung cancer by 20% compared with chest radiographic screening." She also received the International Association for the Study of Lung Cancer’s Joseph W. Cullen Prevention/Early Detection Award for her "lifetime contributions to the prevention of lung cancer or other thoracic malignancies."
