= Cancer screening =

Method to detect cancer

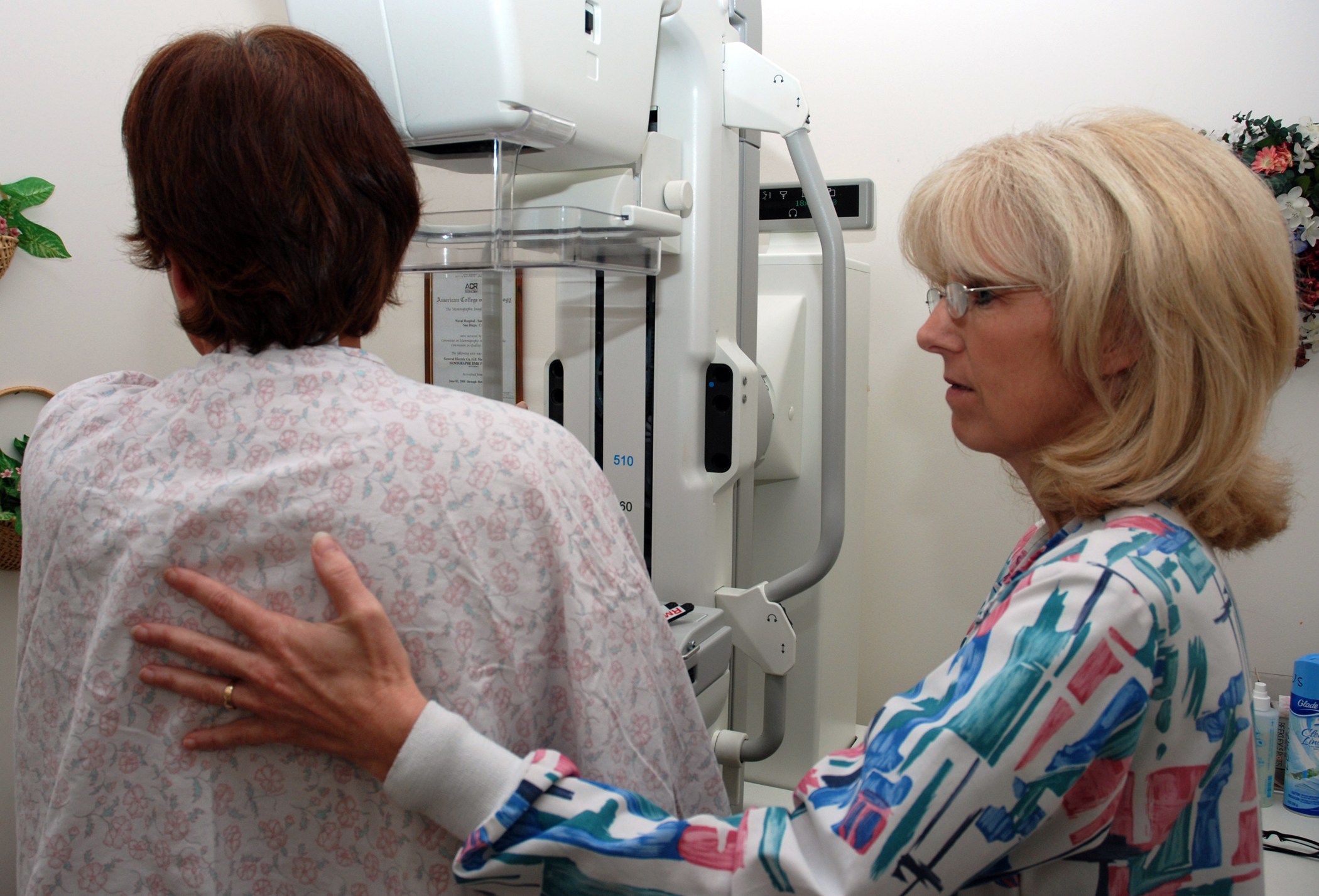
- A person preparing for breast cancer screening by mammography
- Purpose: Detection of cancer prior to onset of symptoms (via several tests/imaging)

Cancer screening is the process of detecting cancer before symptoms appear, involving various methods such as blood tests, urine tests, DNA tests, and medical imaging. The purpose of screening is early cancer detection, to make the cancer easier to treat and to extend life expectancy. In 2019, cancer was the second leading cause of death globally; more recent data is pending due to the COVID-19 pandemic.

Universal screening, also known as mass screening or population screening, involves the screening of individuals within certain age and gender groups, aiming to screen the population for particular cancers or cancer risk factors. Selective screening, also known as targeted screening, identifies individuals with a higher risk of developing cancer, including individuals with a family history (genetic risk) of cancer or individuals engaging in high-risk behaviors such as smoking.

The act of cancer screening plays a pivotal role in both preventing cancer and providing early diagnosis, contributing to increased success rates in treatment and ultimately extending life expectancy. Controversy arises when it is not clear whether the benefits of the screening outweigh the risks associated with the screening procedure, as well as the subsequent diagnostic tests and cancer treatments. Cancer screening is susceptible to producing both false negative and false positive results, underlining the importance of considering the possible errors in the screening process. Additionally, cancer screening can lead to overtreatment if the screening identifies a tumor that is ultimately benign (non-cancerous).

== Medical uses ==
Early detection of cancer is the main advantage of cancer screening, it gives the patient a better chance of surviving or even preventing the cancer. Screening can also help relieve the public burden cancer has on society both financially and socially. The EU's Beating Cancer Plan wishes to make sure that 90% of the population with sufficient risk is screened for breast, cervical and colorectal cancer; around 1.3 million people die from cancer in the EU each year.

== Risks ==
Several factors are considered to determine whether the benefits outweigh the associated risks and costs of cancer screening. Cancer screening trials have demonstrated only a minimal decline in cancer related deaths, and the evaluation of risks to benefits remains an important in determining the overall effectiveness of the cancer screening program.

- While many screening tests (such as the fecal occult blood test or PSA test) are non-invasive, mammography (breast cancer screening) involves ionizing radiation exposure. The breast is highly radiation sensitive, and it receives an approximate dose of 2.6 milligrays per mammography screening. There is however no evidence or research indicating that mammography screening itself directly causes cancer. Additionally, procedures like colonoscopy conducted with sedation, carry a potential risk of perforation.
- Overdiagnosis occurs when cancers or tumors are detected that would never pose harm to an individual. Breast cancer, prostate cancer, and colorectal cancer are examples of cancer types that are prone to overdiagnosis. The consequences of overdiagnosis and overtreatment resulting from cancer screening can lead to a decline in quality of life, due to the adverse effects of unnecessary medication and hospitalization.
- The accuracy of a cancer screening test relies on its sensitivity, and low sensitivity screening tests can overlook cancers. Additionally, a test lacking specificity can incorrectly indicate cancer in a healthy individual. All cancer screening tests generate both false-positive and false-negative results, with a tendency to yield more false positives.
- False-negative tests may provide a false sense of reassurance, possibly leading to a bad prognosis if the cancer is diagnosed at a later stage, despite the utilization of surgeries, therapies, and other treatments.
- The impact of early cancer detection and the treatment outcomes vary, as there are instances where even with available treatment, early detection may not enhance the overall survival. If the cancer screening does not change the treatment outcome, the screening only prolongs the time the individual lived with the knowledge of their cancer diagnosis. This phenomenon is called lead-time bias. A useful screening program reduces the number of years of potential life lost and disability-adjusted life years lost. However, recent studies suggest that in many cases, early detection of cancer increases the likelihood of survival.
- The extent to which a cancer is treatable depends on various factors, including the individual's life expectancy or if the individual is in the end stages of an existing chronic condition. In these cases, ignoring a cancer diagnosis can contribute to a better quality of life. If the cancer diagnosis would not lead to a change in care, cancer screening would not result in a positive outcome for the individual. Overdiagnosis in this case occurs, for example, in patients with end-stage renal disease and a study recommend against cancer screening for such patients.
- For older patients, discussing whether screening is appropriate based on their life expectancy can be uncomfortable for both doctor and patient. Avoiding these conversations can lead to inappropriate screening. Some studies showed that cancer center websites tended to omit information about age cutoffs, along with other information about the downsides of unnecessary screenings.

== Attendance ==
To detect cancer at an early stage, all eligible people need to participate in screenings. However, certain barriers affect attendance rates among disadvantaged individuals, such as those on low incomes, those with mental health disorders, and ethnic minorities.

A 2019 study indicated that individuals with mental health disorders are nearly 25% less likely to attend cancer screening appointments. Among them, women with schizophrenia have the lowest screening rates. Even those with common mood disorders, such as anxiety and depression, are less likely to attend compared the general population. The lower attendance rates are believed to contribute to the earlier mortality of people with mental health disorders.

In 2019, a study indicated that women with mental health disorders in Northern Ireland were less likely to participate in screening for breast cancer in comparison to women without mental health disorders. The documented attendance rate persisted even after accounting for variables, such as marital status and social deprivation.

A study published in 2020 reported that individuals from minority ethnic communities are also less likely to participate cancer screening initiatives. The study showed that British-Pakistani women encountered cultural and language barriers and were not aware that breast cancer screening do not take place in a female-only environment. In the UK, women of South Asian heritage display the lowest likelihood of participating in breast cancer screening. Further studies is still necessary to identify the specific barriers for the different South Asian communities.

Deprivation has been recognised as an additional factor contributing to the decrease of individuals attending cancer screening. A UK study indicated that making cancer screening easily accessible increased attendance. Providing mobile screening units parked in supermarket car parks, for example in the poorer areas of Manchester, was a viable approach for offering lung checks to high-risk groups (such as smokers). A simple test measured obstruction to the airflow in and out of the lungs. A third of the tests revealed airflow obstruction, indicating chronic obstructive pulmonary disease (COPD), a risk factor for lung cancer and various other health conditions.

== By type ==
=== Breast cancer ===
Breast cancer is the most common cancer for women. Screening is done to detect the disease early in asymptomatic women, in an attempt to achieve an earlier diagnosis and lower mortality. Different screening tests are used for breast cancer screening, including clinical and self-examination of the breasts, mammography, and magnetic resonance imaging (MRI). Mammography is the standard method for breast cancer screening. This method is reported to give a 40% reduction in the risk of dying from the disease. Breasts with less fat and more fibrous tissue are known as dense breasts, they are a risk factor for breast cancer. The tissue makes it harder to find tumors while doing a mammogram, therefore MRI screening is proposed to supplement the mammogram in these patients.

Like other cancers there are advantages and disadvantages to screening for breast cancer, with risks of harm by overdiagnosis, a possibility of radiation-induced cancer and false positives. From organized programmes it is estimated that 20% of women with 10 screens from ages 50 to 70 will get a false positive result, less than 5% of these cases will result in further invasive treatment. Radiation-induced cancer from screening with mammography has been approximated to be around 1 to 10 per 100,000 women, which is lower than the estimate of death from breast cancer itself.

Mutations of the genes BRCA1 and BRCA2 can increase the risk of breast cancer in the patients lifetime. In the US, risk factors for breast cancer like the BRCA gene and age are taken into consideration to decide if a screening test is needed and if so which is best for the person.

Many European countries have organized population-level screening programmes for breast cancer. In 2022, the European Commission's Scientific Advice Mechanism concluded that women should be screened for breast cancer earlier, starting while in their mid 40s.

=== Cervical cancer ===
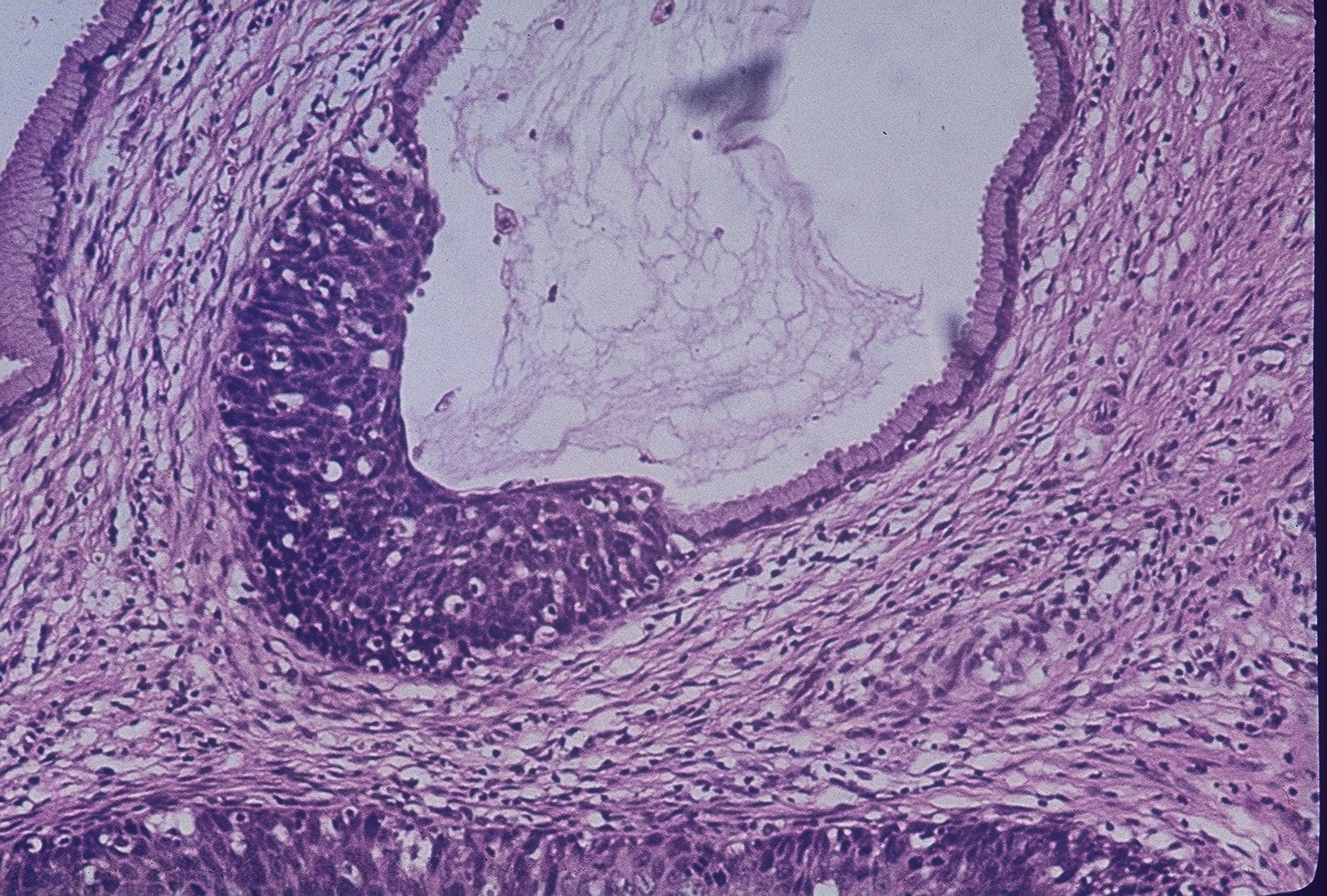
Microscope image of the cervical gland showing an area of high grade epithelial dysplasia

Cervical cancer is the fourth most common cancer for women with an estimated 340,000 deaths according to the World Health Organization (WHO). HPV disease is the leading cause of cervical cancer, therefore making the HPV vaccine the primary prevention measure for the cancer. Screening with the Papanicolaou (Pap) test is consequently the second measure of prevention. The test identifies cells that are precancerous, and are often credited for the reduced mortality.

WHO encourage implementing population-based screening programs. There is a considerable range in the recommended age at which to begin screening around the world. The US does not follow a nation-wide program, and guideline recommendations differ, with some states recommend commencing screening at age 21 and others at 25; the intervals for testing also very, with intervals ranging from 3–5 years. The EU has guidelines for its member states when it comes to cancer screening, but they are not obliged to follow them as they are merely for assistance; it recommends population-based screening programs from age 30 using HPV tests with 5 year intervals.

In 2022, the European Commission's Scientific Advice Mechanism concluded that improved cervical cancer screening, combined with widespread HPV vaccination, presented an opportunity to eliminate cervical cancer in Europe.

=== Colon (colorectal) cancer ===
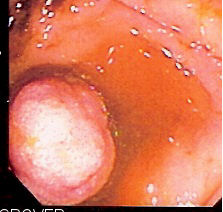
A bowel polyp that can be identified by sigmoidoscopy. Some polyps will develop into cancers if not removed.

Screening for colorectal cancer, if done early enough, is preventive, seeing as benign lumps called polyps in the colon and rectum are the start to almost all cases of colon cancer. These polyps can be identified and removed by screening tests like a colonoscopy, in which the whole colon is visible. If the cancer develops then a colectomy is required, this is a more intrusive surgery. Other treatment methods are needed if the cancer has started to spread more. Early diagnosis of the cancer can remove the need for more intrusive treatments and patients can be healed.

The US Preventive Services Task Force recommends all adults between the ages 50–75 to be screened for colorectal cancer, they also recommend adults between the ages 45–49 be screened as well. For adults 76–85 they recommend offering clinically selective screenings, where patient preference, overall health and history with screening is taken into consideration when deciding where to do a screening. This is due to evidence that there is overall little benefit in screening this group. Stool tests, sigmoidoscopy and colonoscopy are the most accepted screening tests for colorectal cancer in the US.

Colorectal cancer screening programmes are widespread in Europe. In England, adults are screened biennially between ages 60–74, and recently extended to ages 50–74. They are screened via fecal immunochemical test (FIT), that is sent home to the individual. However the program currently has a high threshold in which a big proportion of patients with high-risk polyps are missed and not investigated further. In March 2022, the European Commission's Scientific Advice Mechanism recommended age, sex, and previous screening results be used when deciding screenings frequency to improve diagnosis.

=== Lung cancer ===
As of 2020, lung cancer accounted for 18.4% of cancer mortalities worldwide. Because of late disgnosis only 15% of patients will live more than 5 years after their diagnosis. The NELSON trial concluded that with low-dose computed tomography (LDCT) performed on high-risk populations, there is a significantly lower mortality than with no screening at all.

Smoking is the leading cause of lung cancer, and is the cause of death in 55% of women and 70% of men with lung cancer. The US Preventative Service Task Force revised the recommendations for lung cancer screening in 2021, where annual LDCT is recommended for adults between the ages 50 and 80, who either currently smoke or have a history of smoking 20 or more packs yearly, in the past 15 years. They also ceased the recommendation of annual screening for individuals who have refrained from smoking the last 15 years and those who have new medical issues that already reduce life expectancy. These new recommendations have increased the number of people qualified for lung cancer screening by 86%.

Similarly, in March 2022, the European Commission's Scientific Advice Mechanism recommended lung screening for current and ex-smokers, combined with ongoing smoking cessation programs.

=== Oral cancer ===
The US Preventive Services Task Force (USPSTF) in 2013 found that evidence was insufficient to determine the balance of benefits and harms of screening for oral cancer in adults without symptoms by primary care providers. The American Academy of Family Physicians comes to similar conclusions while the American Cancer Society recommends that adults over 20 years who have periodic health examinations should have the oral cavity examined for cancer. The American Dental Association recommends that providers remain alert for signs of cancer during routine examinations. Oral cancer screening is also recommended by some groups of dental hygienists.

=== Pancreatic cancer ===
Early detection of pancreatic cancer biomarkers was accomplished using SERS-based immunoassay approach. A SERS-based multiplex protein biomarker detection platform in a microfluidic chip is used to detect several protein biomarkers to predict the type of disease and critical biomarkers and increase the chance of diagnosis between diseases with similar biomarkers (prostate cancer, ovarian cancer, and pancreatitis). It is generally agreed that general screening of large groups for pancreatic cancer is not at present likely to be effective, and outside of clinical trials there are no programmes for this. The European Society for Medical Oncology recommends regular screening with endoscopic ultrasound and MRI/CT imaging for those at high risk from inherited genetics, in line with other recommendations, which may also include CT. For screening, special CT scanning procedures may be used, such as multiphase CT scan.

=== Prostate cancer ===
Prostate cancer was estimated to be the second leading cause of death by cancer in the US in 2018. There are different methods used in screening for prostate cancer prostate biopsy, prostate-specific antigen testing (PSA), and digital rectal examination (DRE). In the DRE the examiner inserts a finger in the rectum of the patient and examines size and irregularities in the prostate gland. During PSA screening, blood is tested for the protein, prostate-specific antigen, secreted from the prostate gland, levels over 4 ng/mL are indicators for further analysis. At this cutoff point the patient has a 25% chance of having the disease. Because the antigen is prostate specific it can also be elevated by other concerns in the prostate, like prostatitis and benign enlargements of the gland. A prostate biopsy is then performed to evaluate further diagnosis and treatment.

When PSA screening began in the 1980s, cases of prostate cancer rose by 26% between 1986-2005, with the most affected age group being men under the age of 50. Prostate cancer is a heterogeneous disease, and the cancer will grow aggressively in approximately 1 in 3 cases. Therefore there is a risk of overdiagnosing and overtreating, this has been subject to debate for many years.

The US Preventative Service Task Force have previously recommended against PSA testing in a systematic manner because of the overdiagnosis risks. In recent years recommendations like these are being revised, as new methods of screening are advancing, like MRI scanning as a secondary assessment to the PSA test. More research needs to be done in this area, to identify who has the most benefit of screening.

=== Other cancers ===
USPSTF have recommendations for breast, cervical, colorectal and lung cancer as these have evidence-based screening methods. For the general population other cancers do not have recommended screenings, but for people with risk factors known to be associated with a specific cancer there are screenings available.

== Research ==
=== Whole body imaging ===
Full body CT scans is a type of medical imaging utilized to search for cancer in individuals without clear symptoms. CT scans can pose challenges, especially exposure to ionizing radiation. However, magnetic resonance imaging (MRI) scans are not associated with a radiation risk, and MRI scans are being evaluated for their use in cancer screening. There is a significant risk of detecting incidentalomas - benign lesions that might be misinterpreted as cancer and put patients at potential risk by undergoing unnecessary follow-up procedures.

=== Multi-cancer blood tests ===
In 2023, the FDA granted De Novo marketing authorization to the Invitae Common Hereditary Cancers Panel, a blood-based genetic test that identifies variants in 47 genes associated with an increased risk of developing certain hereditary cancers. The test assesses inherited cancer predisposition rather than detecting whether cancer is currently present. By contrast, multi-cancer detection (MCD), also called multi-cancer early detection (MCED), tests are intended to screen for multiple cancers by measuring biomarkers in blood that may be released by cancer cells, such as fragments of DNA. More MCED tests are currently in development. The tests include,

- Galleri by Grail (US, 2021).
- Guardant Shield (US, 2022).
- Dxcover (UK).
- SPOT-MAS by Gene Solutions (Asia)

In 2026, results were published from the NHS-Galleri trial, a randomized controlled trial involving 142,250 adults aged 50 to 77 in England. After three annual rounds of screening, adding the Galleri multi-cancer early detection test to usual care did not significantly reduce the incidence of stage III or IV cancers among 12 prespecified cancer types compared with usual care alone (incidence rate ratio 1.03; 95% confidence interval 0.92–1.14). Stage IV cancers alone were less frequent in the screened group (incidence rate ratio 0.86; 95% confidence interval 0.74–1.00), although further follow-up was considered necessary to determine the clinical significance of this finding.

== See also ==
- Breath-based cancer detection
