= Failure bias =

Logical error of focusing on incidents on failure

Failure bias is the logical error of concentrating on the people or things that failed to make it past some selection process and overlooking those that did, typically because of their lack of visibility. This can lead to false conclusions in several different ways. It is a form of selection bias.

In several of these cases, one measure of success is precisely the lack of public awareness of people or things that are undergoing such selection process. This means, in the possibility that there is at least one agent who is interested in the success of the people or things that are going through the selection process, the agent(s) will be interested into keeping the subject out of the public eye, and thus, to raise the likelihood of the failure bias happening.

== Examples ==
- Espionage
- Censorship

== See also ==
- Selection bias
- Cherry picking
- Econometrics
- Fooled by Randomness
- Meta-analysis
- Multiple comparisons problem
- Selection principle
- Texas sharpshooter fallacy
