= Pack-year =

Clinical quantification of cigarette smoking

A pack-year (abbreviated py) is a clinical quantification of cigarette smoking used to measure a person's exposure to tobacco. This is used to assess their risk of developing lung cancer or other pathologies related to tobacco use. However, it is difficult to rely on the assessment based on the pack-year due to the different nature of the packaging by different companies.

== Definition ==
The pack-year is a unit used to measure the amount a person has smoked over a long period of time. It is calculated by multiplying the number of packs of cigarettes smoked per day by the number of years the person has smoked. For example, 1 pack-year is equal to smoking 20 cigarettes (1 pack) per day for 1 year, or 40 cigarettes per day for half a year, and so on.

One pack-year is the equivalent of 365 packs of cigarettes or 7,300 cigarettes, in a year as smoker.

== Calculation ==
Number of pack-years = (packs smoked per day) × (years as a smoker)

or

Number of pack-years = (number of cigarettes smoked per day/20) × number of years smoked. (1 pack has 20 cigarettes in some countries)

Note that despite the unit being called a "pack-year," the actual unit is simply a number of packs (as noted above).

$$\begin{align}
1 \text{ pack-year} &= \frac{1 \text{ pack}}{\text{day}} \cdot 1 \text{ year}\\
&= \frac{1 \text{ pack}}{\text{day}} \cdot 365 \text{ days}\\
&= 365 \text{ packs}\\
&= 365 \text{ packs}\cdot\frac{20 \text{ cigarettes}}{\text{pack}}\\
&= 7,300 \text{ cigarettes}
\end{align}$$

For example: a person who has smoked 15 cigarettes a day for 40 years has a (15/20) × 40 = 30 pack-year smoking history.

One pack-year is smoking 20 cigarettes a day for one year. If someone has smoked 10 cigarettes a day for 6 years they would have a 3 pack-year history. Someone who has smoked 40 cigarettes (2 packs) daily for 20 years has a 40 pack-year history.

== Significance and usage ==
Quantification of pack-years smoked is important in clinical care, where degree of tobacco exposure is correlated to risk of disease such as lung cancer and heart disease.
