= National Lung Screening Trial =

- other names: NLST, NCT00047385
- sponsor: National Cancer Institute
- number of participants: 53,454
- start: August 2002
- end: October 2010
- primary completion: October 2010

The National Lung Screening Trial was a United States-based clinical trial which recruited research participants between 2002 and 2004. It was sponsored by the National Cancer Institute and conducted by the American College of Radiology Imaging Network and the Lung Screening Study Group. The major objective of the trial was to compare the efficacy of low-dose helical computed tomography (CT screening) and standard chest X-ray as methods of lung cancer screening to reduce deaths from lung cancer. The primary study ended in 2010, and the initial findings were published in November 2010, with the main results published in 2011 in the New England Journal of Medicine.

The trial led to a recommendation in the United States in 2013 that CT screening be used on people at high risk for developing lung cancer in an effort to detect the cancer earlier and reduce mortality. Current United States Preventive Services Task Force recommendations as of 2021 are "annual screening for lung cancer with low-dose computed tomography (LDCT) in adults aged 50 to 80 years who have a 20 pack-year smoking history and currently smoke or have quit within the past 15 years" (Grade B).

== Study design ==
The study looked at 53,454 current or former heavy smokers from 33 medical centers in the US. The ages of the patients in the trial varied from 55 to 74. When their initial findings were published in the New England Journal of Medicine, the researchers reported that low-dose CT scanning was associated with a 20% decrease in deaths from lung cancer, and that this effect was visible in both current smokers and former smokers. More recent research based on this trial, published in JAMA Internal Medicine, has found that low-dose computed tomography detects many false positives—in the study, 18% of total detections were considered to be an overdiagnosis, i.e. the cancer would never have threatened the life of the patient.

The National Cancer Institute funded a $300m study, the National Lung Screening Trial (NLST), which began in 2002, to compare the effectiveness of CT scan screening versus X-ray screening. This study, too, raised concern in the media over potential conflicts of interest related to the tobacco company, although this time on the contra-CT scan side: on October 8, 2007, the Wall Street Journal reported that at least two lead investigators of the study had conflicts of interest arising from their serving as paid, expert defense witnesses for the tobacco industry – one of them had given testimony asserting that promoting CT screening was "reckless or irresponsible" until it was shown by randomized controlled trials to reduce lung cancer mortality; another had provided an expert report warning that CT screening, because of its potential to identify cancers that would never cause symptoms or death (overdiagnosis), "may do more harm than good."

== Results ==
Deaths in either group were then logged for up to five years. As of October 2010, 354 people in the CT scan group had died from lung cancer, versus 442 people in the X-ray group; in other words, deaths in the CT scan group of patients were 20.3% lower than in the X-ray group. The study's review board concluded that this difference was statistically significant and recommended terminating the study. The director of the National Cancer Institute's director, Harold Varmus, said that early analysis results appeared to indicate that CT scans detected more lung cancers, at an earlier and more treatable stage, and that CT scans could therefore reduce the number of deaths in patients at high risk of lung cancer. Moreover, the medical complications resulting directly or indirectly from CT screening were minimal in those who were not diagnosed with lung cancer. [5]
