= Length time bias =

Type of bias in epidemiology

Length time bias in cancer screening. Screening appears to lead to better survival even when actually no one lived any longer.

Length time bias (or length bias) is an overestimation of survival duration due to the relative excess of cases detected that are asymptomatically slowly progressing, while fast progressing cases are detected after giving symptoms.

Length time bias is often discussed in the context of the benefits of cancer screening, and it can lead to the perception that screening leads to better outcomes when in reality it has no effect. Fast-growing tumors generally have a shorter asymptomatic phase than slower-growing tumors. Thus, there is a shorter period of time during which the cancer is present in the body (and so might be detected by screening) but not yet large enough to cause symptoms, that would cause the patient to seek medical care and be diagnosed without screening.

As a result, if the same number of slow-growing and fast-growing tumors appear in a year, the screening test detects more slow-growers than fast-growers. If the slow growing tumors are less likely to be fatal than the fast growers, the people whose cancer is detected by screening do better, on average, than the people whose tumors are detected from symptoms (or at autopsy) even if there is no real benefit to catching the cancer earlier. That can give the impression that detecting cancers by screening causes cancers to be less dangerous even if less dangerous cancers are simply more likely to be detected by screening.
