= Lead time bias =

Time between a new disease's identification and first diagnoses

Lead time bias occurs if testing increases the perceived survival time without affecting the course of the disease.

Lead time bias happens when survival time appears longer because diagnosis was done earlier (for instance, by screening), irrespective of whether the patient lived longer. Lead time is the duration of time between the detection of a disease (by screening or based on new experimental criteria) and its usual clinical presentation and diagnosis (based on traditional criteria). For example, it is the time between early detection by screening and the time when diagnosis would have been made clinically (without screening). It is an important factor when evaluating the effectiveness of a specific test.

== Relationship between screening and survival ==
The goal of screening is earlier detection (to diagnose a disease earlier than it would be without screening). Therefore, if screening works, it needs to advance in time to the moment of diagnosis. In other words, screening needs to introduce a lead time. However, the lead time itself biases survival statistics: people with diseases detected by screening appear to have a longer survival (the time the person has lived after diagnosis) only because screening starts the clock sooner.

Consider, for instance, a disease where there is no screening that is diagnosed by symptoms when patients are 60 years old and kills them when they are 65 years old. These patients lived 5 years after the diagnosis. Now, consider that with screening, the disease is detected when the patients are 55 years old, but they still die when they are 65. They did not live any longer because of earlier detection, but they survived 10 years after the diagnosis (only because the disease was diagnosed 5 years earlier). Therefore, earlier detection alone is not enough to achieve longer survival.

Lead time bias affects the interpretation of the five-year survival rate, effectively making it appear that people survive longer with cancer even in cases where the course of cancer is the same as in those who were diagnosed later.

Another example is when early diagnosis by screening may not prolong the life of someone but just determine the propensity of the person to a disease or medical condition, such as by DNA testing. No additional life span has been gained, and the patient may even be subject to added anxiety as the patient must live for longer with knowledge of the disease. For example, the genetic disorder Huntington's disease is diagnosed when symptoms appear at around 50, and the person dies at around 65. The typical patient, therefore, lives about 15 years after diagnosis. A genetic test at birth makes it possible to diagnose this disorder earlier. If this newborn baby dies at around 65, the person will have "survived" 65 years after diagnosis, without having actually lived any longer than those diagnosed without DNA detection.

== See also ==
- Length time bias
