= New Delhi =

Capital city of India

New Delhi Naī Dillī
- City and federal capital
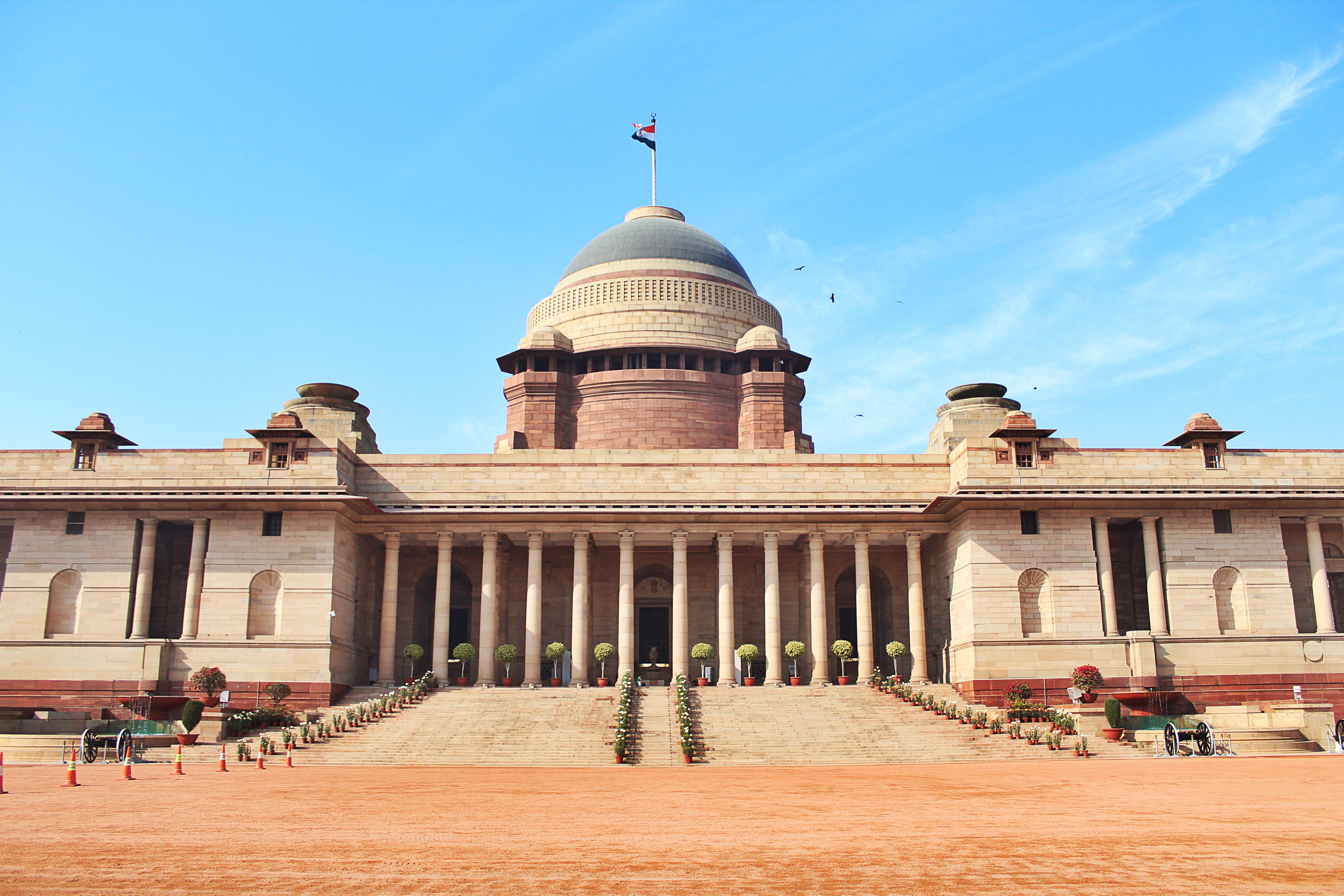
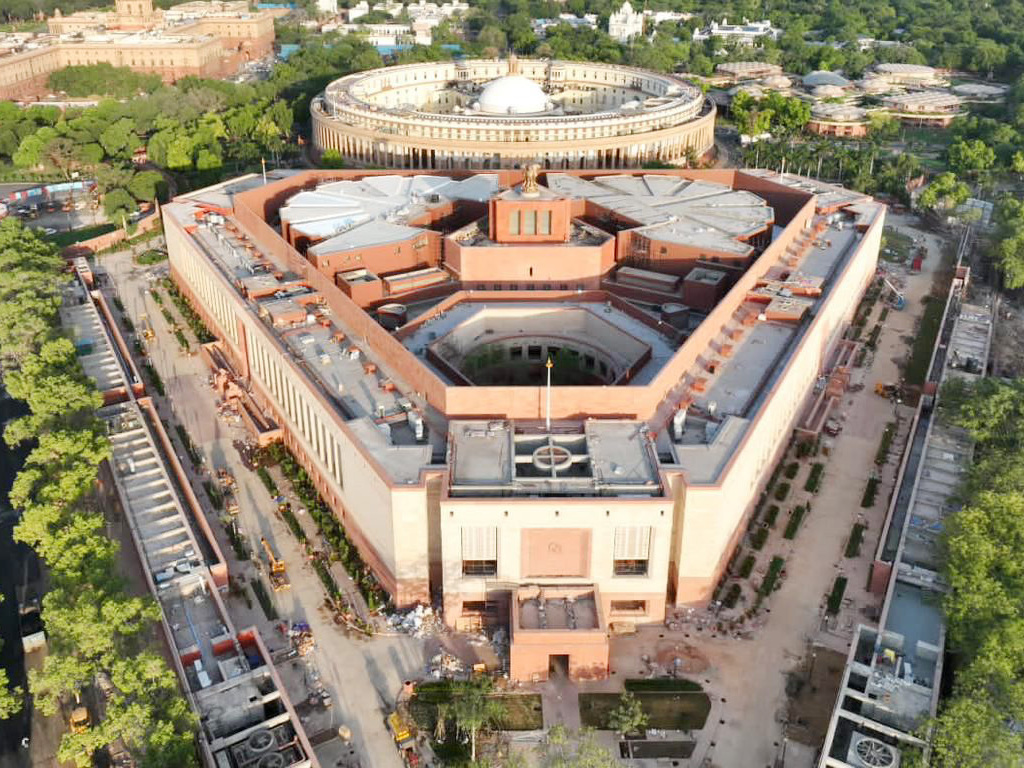
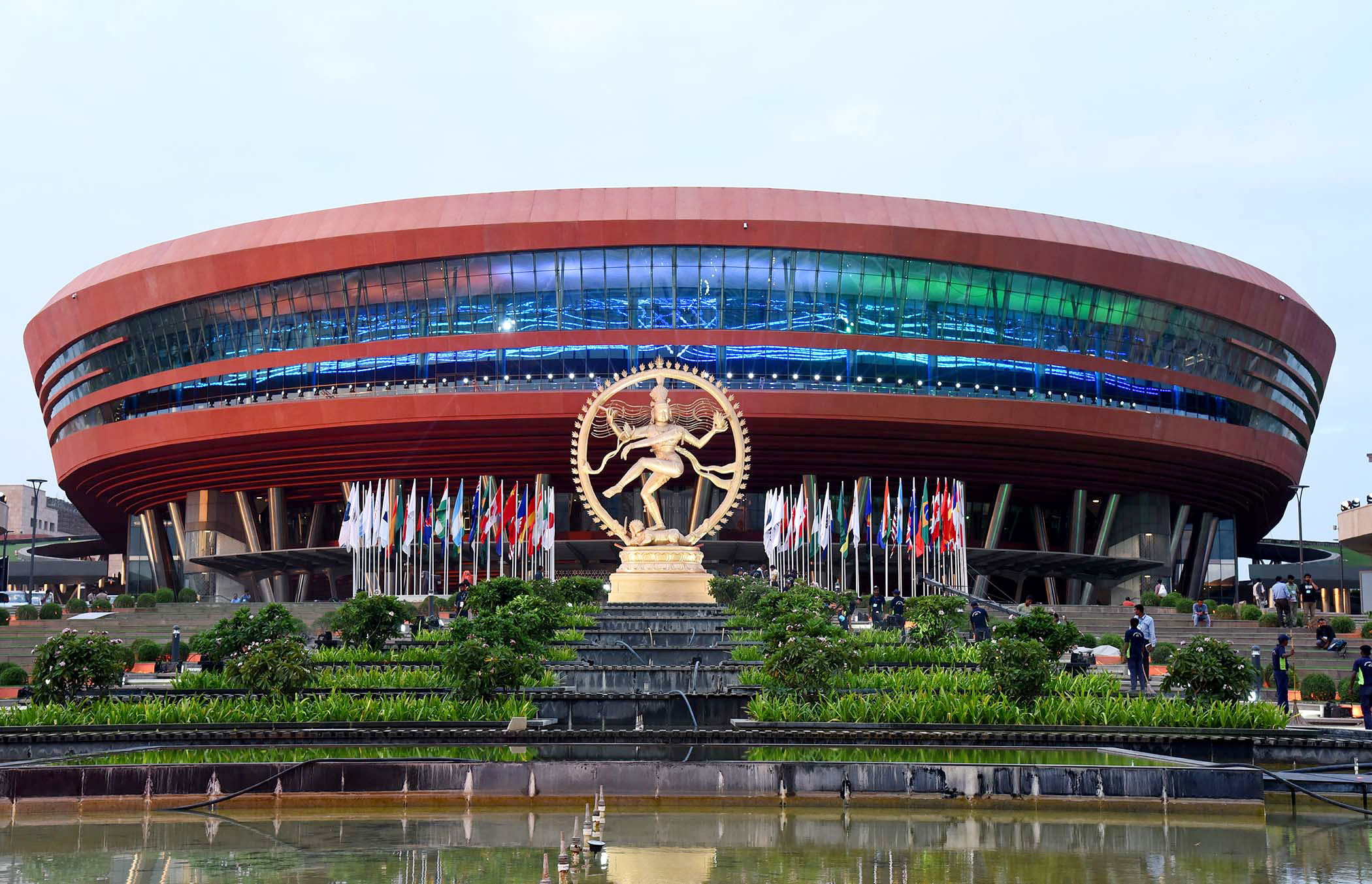
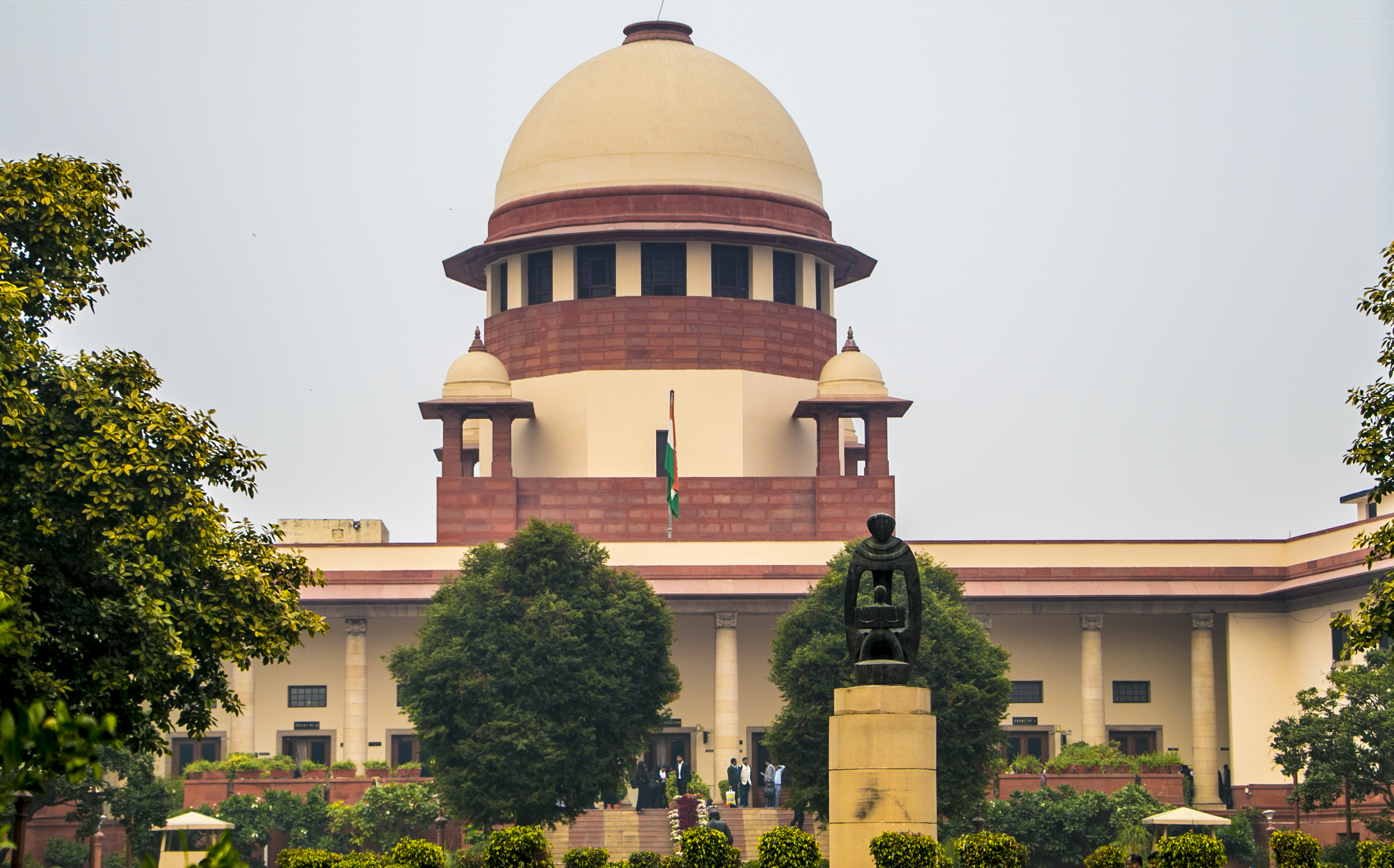
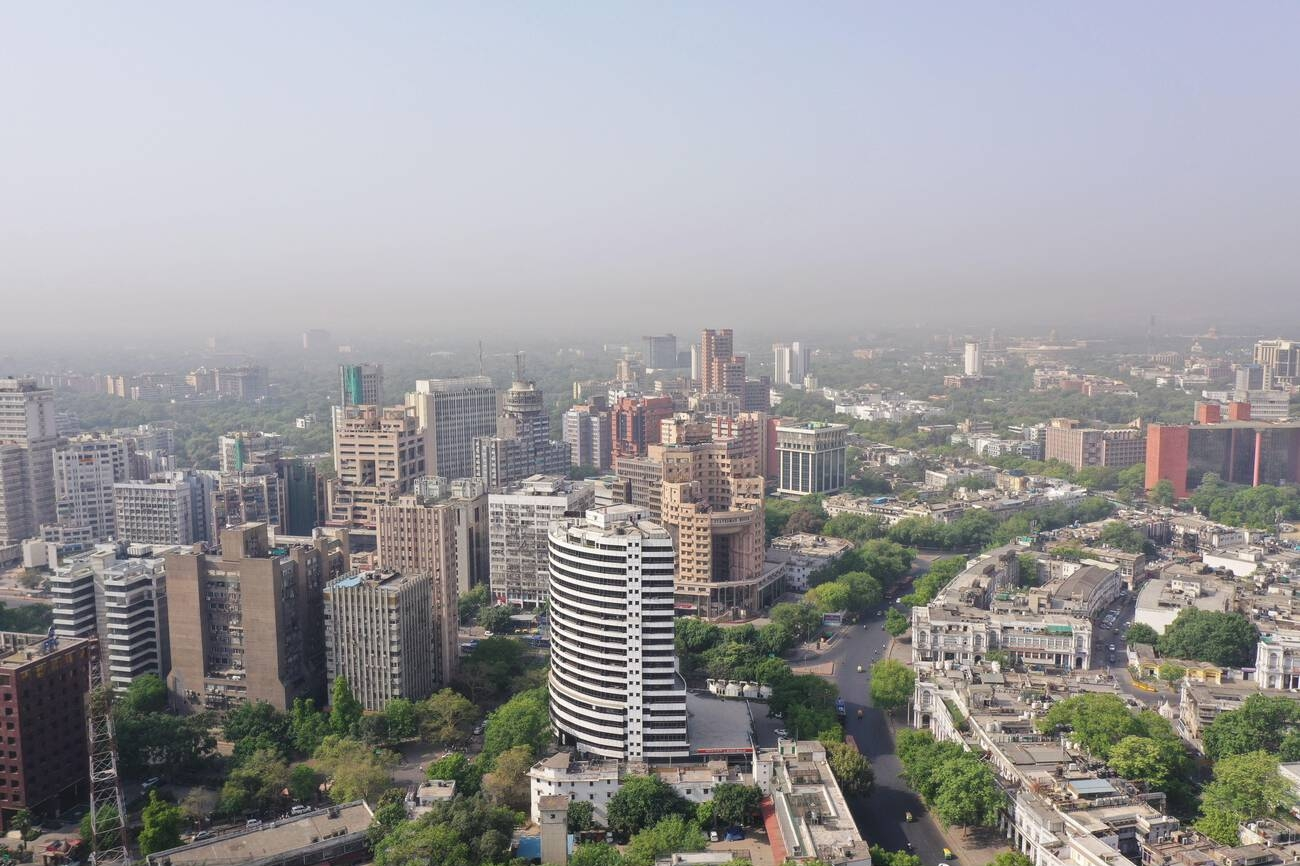
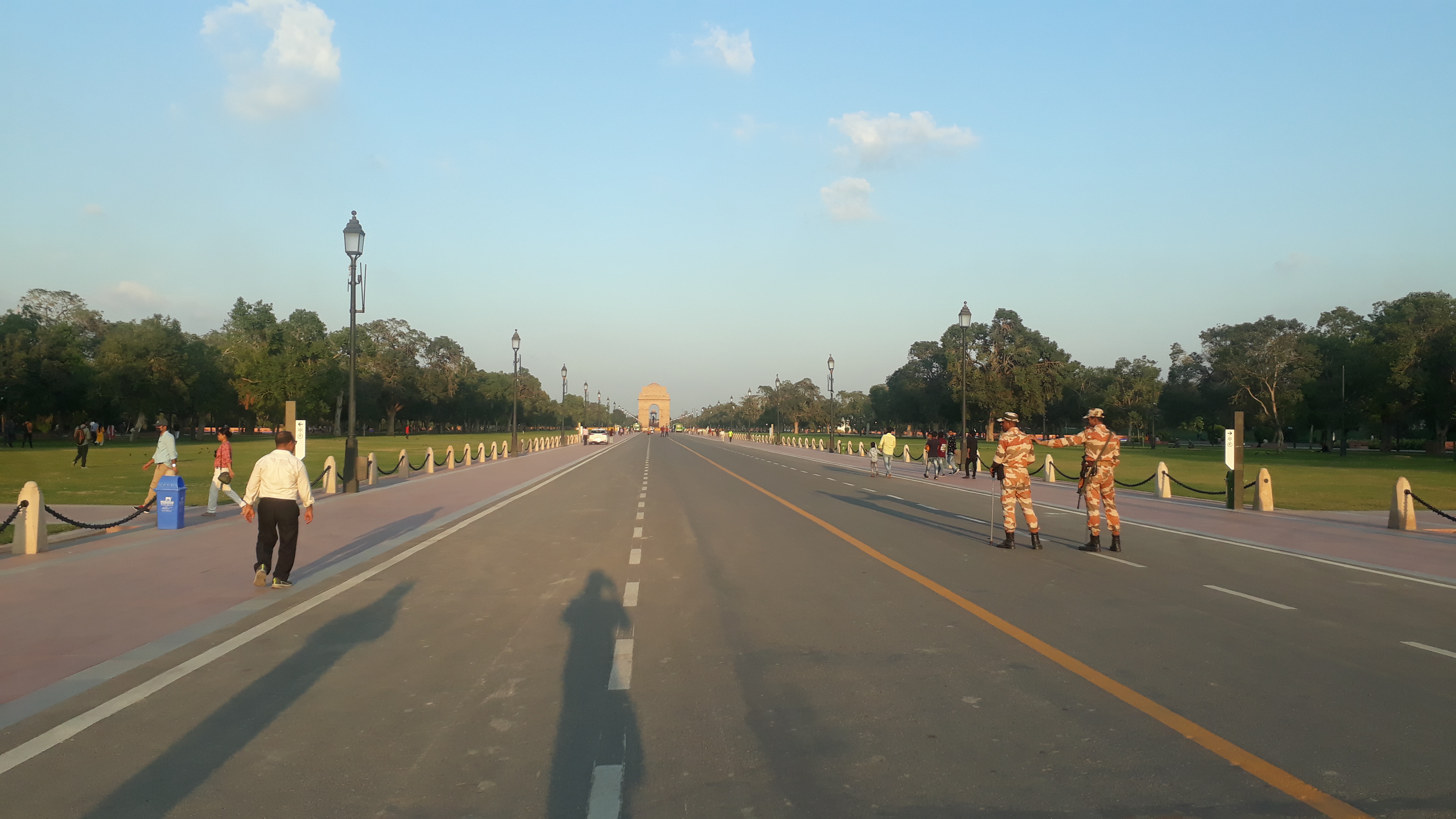
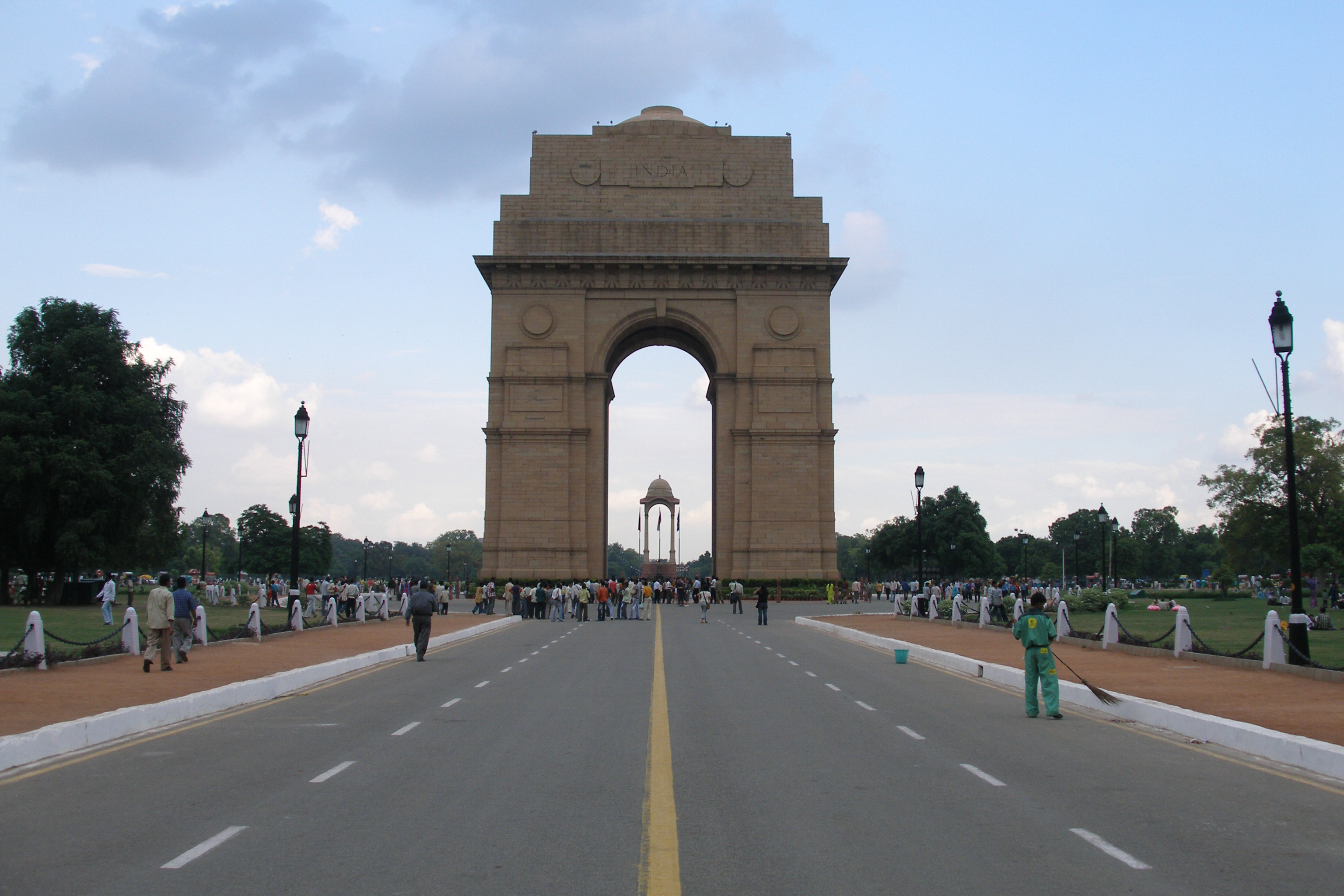
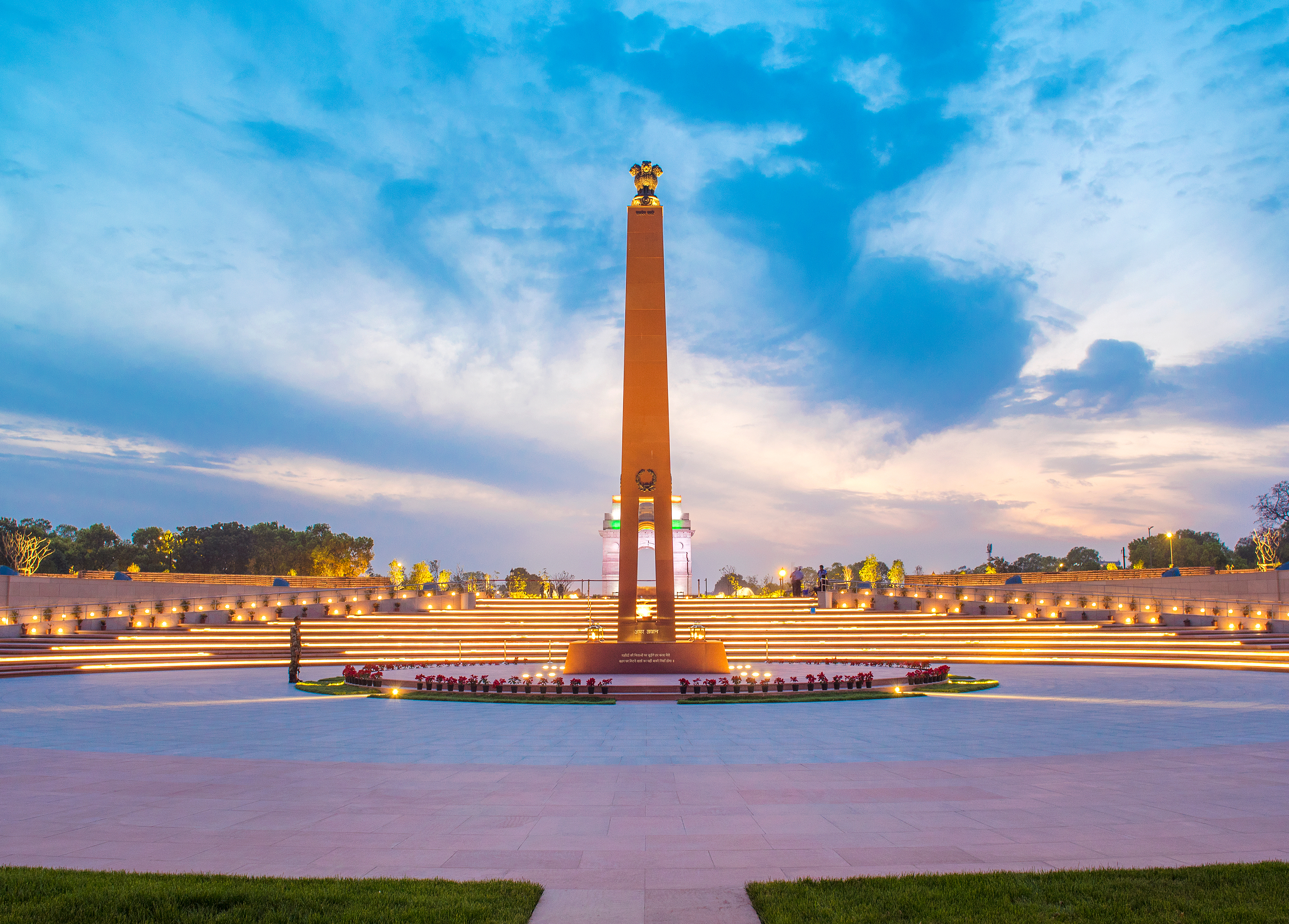
- Rashtrapati Bhavan Parliament House Bharat Mandapam Supreme Court of India Skyline of Connaught Place Rajpath India Gate National War Memorial

- Flag Seal
- Motto: Śrama ēva jayatē Labour is victory
- Interactive map of New Delhi
- Location in India Location in Asia New Delhi (Asia)
- Coordinates: 28°36′50″N 77°12′32″E
- Country: India
- Union territory: Delhi
- Lok Sabha constituency: New Delhi
- Legislative Assembly: New Delhi
- District: New Delhi
- Established: 12 December 1911
- Inaugurated: 13 February 1931
- Founder: George V

Government
  - Type: Municipal Council
  - Body: New Delhi Municipal Council

Area
  - City: 42.7 km^{2} (16.5 sq mi)
- Elevation: 230 m (750 ft)

Population (2011)
  - City: 249,998
  - Density: 5,850/km^{2} (15,200/sq mi)
  - Metro (2018; includes entire urban Delhi + part of NCR): 28,514,000

Languages
  - Official: Hindi
  - Regional: Haryanvi (Deswali)
- Time zone: UTC+05:30 (IST)
- PIN: 110001, 121003, 1220xx, 201313 (New Delhi)
- Area code: +91-11
- Vehicle registration: DL-2X
- International Airport: Indira Gandhi International Airport
- Metro line(s): Red Line; Yellow Line; Blue Line; Green Line; Violet Line; Pink Line; Airport Express; Magenta Line; Grey Line
- Website: www.ndmc.gov.in

New Delhi (Note: /ˈnjuː ˈdɛ.li/; Hindi: Naī Dillī) is the capital and a city of India and a part of the National Capital Territory of Delhi (NCT). New Delhi is the seat of all three branches of the Government of India, hosting the Rashtrapati Bhavan (Presidential Palace), Sansad Bhavan (Parliament House), and the Supreme Court. New Delhi is a municipality within the NCT, administered by the New Delhi Municipal Council (NDMC), which covers mostly Lutyens' Delhi and a few adjacent areas. The municipal area is part of a larger administrative district, the New Delhi district.

Although colloquially Delhi and New Delhi are used interchangeably to refer to the National Capital Territory of Delhi, both are distinct entities, with the municipality and the New Delhi district forming a relatively small part within the megacity of Delhi. The National Capital Region is an even larger entity, comprising the entire NCT along with adjoining districts in the two neighbouring states forming a continuously built-up area with it, including Ghaziabad, Noida, Greater Noida, Meerut, YEIDA City, Gurgaon, and Faridabad.

The foundation stone of New Delhi, south of central Delhi, was laid by George V during the Delhi Durbar of 1911. It was designed by British architects Edwin Lutyens and Herbert Baker. The new capital was inaugurated on 13 February 1931, by Viceroy and Governor-General Irwin.

== History ==
=== Establishment ===
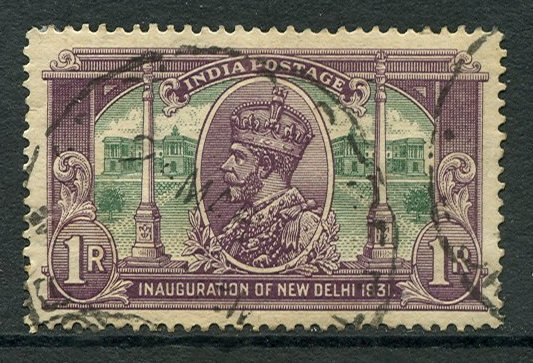
The 1931 postage stamp series celebrated the inauguration of New Delhi as the seat of government. The one rupee stamp shows George V with the "Secretariat Building" and Dominion Columns.

Under British rule, Calcutta was the capital of India until December 1911. However, it had become the centre of the nationalist movements since the late nineteenth century, which led to the partition of Bengal by Viceroy Curzon. This created a massive upsurge in political and religious activity including political assassinations of British officials in Calcutta. The anti-colonial sentiments among the public led to a complete boycott of British goods, which forced the colonial government to reunite Bengal and immediately shift the capital to New Delhi.

Old Delhi had served as the political centre of several empires of medieval India and the Delhi Sultanate, most notably of the Mughal Empire from 1649 to 1857. During the early 1900s, a proposal was made to the British administration to shift the capital of the British Indian Empire, as India was officially named, from Calcutta on the east coast, to Delhi. The Government of British India felt that it would be logistically easier to administer India from Delhi, which is in the centre of northern India. The land for building the new city of Delhi was acquired under the Land Acquisition Act, 1894.

During the Delhi Durbar on 12 December 1911, George V while laying the foundation stone for the viceroy's residence in the Coronation Park, Kingsway Camp, declared that the capital of the Raj would be shifted from Calcutta to Delhi. Three days later, George V and his consort, Mary, laid the foundation stone of New Delhi at Kingsway Camp. Large parts of New Delhi were planned by Edwin Lutyens, who first visited Delhi in 1912, and Herbert Baker, both leading 20th-century British architects. The contract was given to Sobha Singh. The original plan called for its construction in Tughlaqabad, inside the Tughlaqabad Fort, but this was given up because of the Delhi-Calcutta trunk line that passed through the fort. Construction really began after World War I and was completed by 1931. The gardening and planning of plantations was led by A.E.P. Griessen, and later William Mustoe. The city that was later dubbed "Lutyens' Delhi" was inaugurated in ceremonies beginning on 10 February 1931 by Viceroy Irwin. Lutyens designed the central administrative area of the city as a testament to Britain's imperial aspirations.

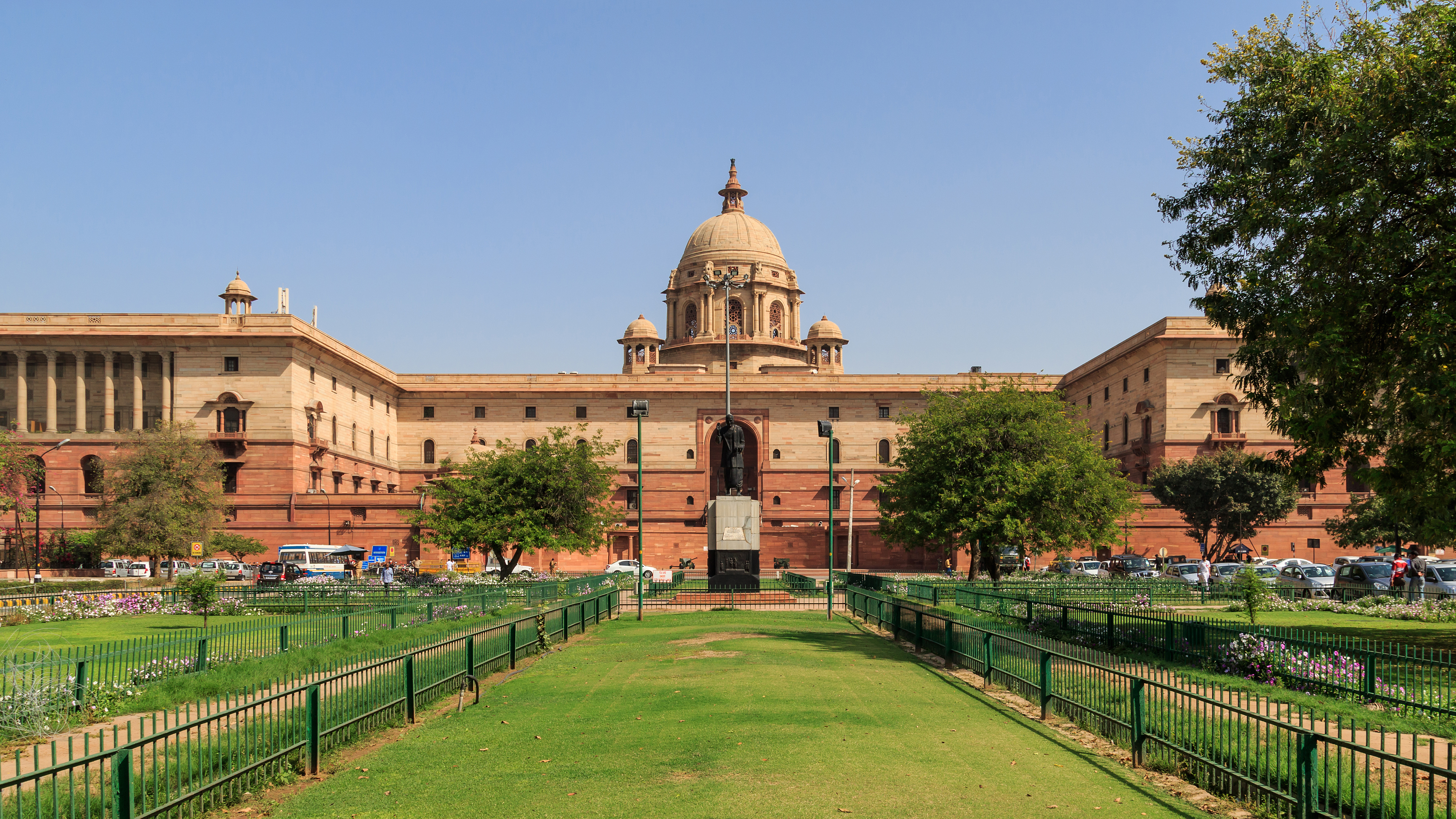
The Secretariat Building houses Ministries of Defence, Finance, Home Affairs and External Affairs. It also houses the Prime Minister's office.

Soon Lutyens started considering other places. Indeed, the Delhi Town Planning Committee, set up to plan the new imperial capital, with George Swinton as chairman, and John A. Brodie and Lutyens as members, submitted reports for both north and south sites. However, it was rejected by the Viceroy when the cost of acquiring the necessary properties was found to be too high. The central axis of New Delhi, which today faces east at India Gate, was previously meant to be a north–south axis linking the Viceroy's House at one end with Paharganj at the other. Eventually, owing to space constraints and the presence of a large number of heritage sites on the north side, the committee settled on the south site. A site atop the Raisina Hill, formerly Raisina Village , was chosen for the Rashtrapati Bhavan, then known as the Viceroy's House. The reason for this choice was that the hill lay directly opposite the Dinapanah citadel, which was also considered the site of Indraprastha, the ancient region of Delhi. Subsequently, the foundation stone was shifted from the site of Delhi Durbar of 1911–1912, where the Coronation Pillar stood, and embedded in the walls of the forecourt of the Secretariat. The Rajpath, also known as King's Way, stretched from the India Gate to the Rashtrapati Bhavan. The Secretariat building, the two blocks of which flank the Rashtrapati Bhavan and houses ministries of the government of India, and the Parliament House, both designed by Baker, are located at the Sansad Marg and run parallel to the Rajpath.

In the south, land up to Safdarjung's Tomb was acquired to create what is today known as Lutyens' Bungalow Zone. Before construction could begin on the rocky ridge of Raisina Hill, a circular railway line around the Council House (now Parliament House), called the Imperial Delhi Railway, was built to transport construction material and workers for the next twenty years. The last stumbling block was the Agra-Delhi railway line that cut right through the site earmarked for the hexagonal All-India War Memorial (India Gate) and Kingsway (Rajpath), which was a problem because the Old Delhi Railway Station served the entire city at that time. The line was shifted to run along the Yamuna River, and it began operating in 1924. The New Delhi Railway Station opened in 1926, with a single platform at Ajmeri Gate near Paharganj, and was completed in time for the city's inauguration in 1931. As construction of the Viceroy's House (the present Rashtrapati Bhavan), Central Secretariat, Parliament House, and All-India War Memorial (India Gate) was winding down, the building of a shopping district and a new plaza, Connaught Place, began in 1929, and was completed by 1933. Named after Prince Arthur, 1st Duke of Connaught (1850–1942), it was designed by Robert Tor Russell, chief architect to the Public Works Department (PWD).

After the capital of India moved to Delhi, a temporary secretariat building was constructed in a few months in 1912 in North Delhi. Most of the government offices of the new capital moved here from the 'Old secretariat' in Civil Lines Delhi (the building now houses the Delhi Legislative Assembly), a decade before the new capital was inaugurated in 1931. Many employees were brought into the new capital from distant parts of India, including the Bengal Presidency and Madras Presidency. Subsequently, housing for them was developed around the Gole Market area in the 1920s. Built in the 1940s to house government employees, with bungalows for senior officials in the nearby Lodi Estate area, Lodi Colony, near historic Lodi Gardens, was the last residential area built by the British Raj.

=== Post-independence ===
After India gained independence in 1947, limited autonomy was conferred to New Delhi and was administered by a Chief Commissioner appointed by the Government of India. In 1966, Delhi was converted into a union territory and eventually the Chief Commissioner was replaced by a Lieutenant Governor. The Constitution (Sixty-ninth Amendment) Act, 1991 declared the Union Territory of Delhi to be formally known as the National Capital Territory of Delhi. A system was introduced under which the elected government was given wide powers, excluding law and order which remained with the Central Government. The actual enforcement of the legislation came in 1993.

The first major extension of New Delhi outside of Lutyens' Delhi came in the 1950s when the Central Public Works Department (CPWD) developed a large area of land southwest of Lutyens' Delhi to create the diplomatic enclave of Chanakyapuri, where land was allotted for embassies, chanceries, high commissions and residences of ambassadors, around a wide central vista, Shanti Path.

== Geography ==
With a total area of 42.7 km^{2} (16.5 sq mi), the municipality of New Delhi forms a small part of the Delhi metropolitan area. Since the city is located on the Indo-Gangetic Plain, there is little difference in elevation across the city. New Delhi and surrounding areas were once a part of the Aravali Range; all that is left of those mountains is the Delhi Ridge, which is also called the Lungs of Delhi. While New Delhi lies on the floodplains of the Yamuna River, it is essentially a landlocked city. East of the river is the urban area of Shahdara.

=== Seismology ===
New Delhi falls under the seismic zone-IV, making it vulnerable to earthquakes. It lies on several fault lines and thus experiences frequent earthquakes, most of them of mild intensity. There was a spike in the number of earthquakes between 2011 and 2015, most notable being a 5.4 magnitude earthquake in 2015 with its epicentre in Nepal, a 4.7-magnitude earthquake on 25 November 2007, a 4.2-magnitude earthquake on 7 September 2011, a 5.2-magnitude earthquake on 5 March 2012, and a swarm of twelve earthquakes, including four of magnitudes 2.5, 2.8, 3.1, and 3.3, on 12 November 2013.

=== Climate ===
Delhi features a humid subtropical climate (Köppen Cwa), closely bordering a hot semi-arid climate (Köppen BSh), with hot summers accompanied by frequent thunderstorms locally known as andhi, and cool winters that are characterised by dense fog. The city's rainfall pattern is heavily influenced by the summer monsoon entering in late June and continuing till mid-September. Summers are long, extending from mid April to late September, with the monsoon season occurring in the middle of the summer. Winter starts in November and peaks in January. Winters are very mild. The annual mean temperature is around 25 °C (77 °F); monthly daily mean temperatures range from approximately 13 to 34 °C (55 to 93 °F). New Delhi's highest temperature ever recorded is 49.9 °C (121.8 °F) on 28 May 2024 at Met Delhi Mungeshpur while the lowest temperature ever recorded is −2.2 °C (28.0 °F) on 11 January 1967 at Indira Gandhi International Airport (formerly known as Palam Airport). The average annual rainfall is 774.4 millimetres (30.49 in) and monsoon rainfall from June to September is about 640.4 millimetres (25.21 in), most of which is during the monsoons in July and August.

Climate data for New Delhi (Safdarjung) 1991–2020 normals, extremes 1901–present
| Month | Jan | Feb | Mar | Apr | May | Jun | Jul | Aug | Sep | Oct | Nov | Dec | Year |
|---|---|---|---|---|---|---|---|---|---|---|---|---|---|
| Record high °C (°F) | 32.5 (90.5) | 34.1 (93.4) | 40.6 (105.1) | 45.6 (114.1) | 47.2 (117.0) | 46.7 (116.1) | 45.0 (113.0) | 42.0 (107.6) | 40.6 (105.1) | 39.4 (102.9) | 36.1 (97.0) | 30.0 (86.0) | 47.2 (117.0) |
| Mean maximum °C (°F) | 25.8 (78.4) | 29.5 (85.1) | 35.8 (96.4) | 41.4 (106.5) | 44.3 (111.7) | 43.7 (110.7) | 40.1 (104.2) | 37.4 (99.3) | 37.1 (98.8) | 36.1 (97.0) | 32.2 (90.0) | 27.3 (81.1) | 44.8 (112.6) |
| Mean daily maximum °C (°F) | 20.1 (68.2) | 24.2 (75.6) | 29.9 (85.8) | 36.5 (97.7) | 39.9 (103.8) | 39.0 (102.2) | 35.6 (96.1) | 34.2 (93.6) | 34.1 (93.4) | 33.0 (91.4) | 28.4 (83.1) | 22.8 (73.0) | 31.4 (88.5) |
| Daily mean °C (°F) | 13.8 (56.8) | 17.4 (63.3) | 22.7 (72.9) | 28.9 (84.0) | 32.7 (90.9) | 33.3 (91.9) | 31.5 (88.7) | 30.4 (86.7) | 29.5 (85.1) | 26.2 (79.2) | 20.5 (68.9) | 15.6 (60.1) | 25.2 (77.4) |
| Mean daily minimum °C (°F) | 7.5 (45.5) | 10.6 (51.1) | 15.6 (60.1) | 21.3 (70.3) | 25.8 (78.4) | 27.7 (81.9) | 27.5 (81.5) | 26.7 (80.1) | 25.0 (77.0) | 19.5 (67.1) | 13.0 (55.4) | 8.4 (47.1) | 18.9 (66.0) |
| Mean minimum °C (°F) | 3.5 (38.3) | 6.0 (42.8) | 10.7 (51.3) | 16.3 (61.3) | 20.5 (68.9) | 22.2 (72.0) | 24.3 (75.7) | 23.7 (74.7) | 21.9 (71.4) | 15.0 (59.0) | 8.8 (47.8) | 4.5 (40.1) | 3.1 (37.6) |
| Record low °C (°F) | −0.6 (30.9) | 1.6 (34.9) | 4.4 (39.9) | 10.7 (51.3) | 15.1 (59.2) | 17.6 (63.7) | 20.3 (68.5) | 20.7 (69.3) | 16.1 (61.0) | 9.4 (48.9) | 3.9 (39.0) | 0.0 (32.0) | −0.6 (30.9) |
| Average rainfall mm (inches) | 19.1 (0.75) | 21.3 (0.84) | 17.4 (0.69) | 16.3 (0.64) | 30.7 (1.21) | 74.1 (2.92) | 209.7 (8.26) | 233.1 (9.18) | 123.5 (4.86) | 15.1 (0.59) | 6.0 (0.24) | 8.1 (0.32) | 774.4 (30.5) |
| Average rainy days | 1.7 | 1.5 | 1.7 | 1.0 | 2.7 | 4.8 | 9.7 | 10.2 | 5.5 | 0.8 | 0.4 | 0.6 | 40.6 |
| Average relative humidity (%) (at 17:30 IST) | 57 | 46 | 37 | 25 | 28 | 43 | 63 | 68 | 60 | 47 | 52 | 59 | 49 |
| Average dew point °C (°F) | 8 (46) | 11 (52) | 14 (57) | 14 (57) | 18 (64) | 22 (72) | 26 (79) | 25 (77) | 23 (73) | 18 (64) | 14 (57) | 10 (50) | 17 (62) |
| Mean monthly sunshine hours | 220.1 | 223.2 | 248.0 | 276.0 | 285.2 | 219.0 | 179.8 | 176.7 | 219.0 | 260.4 | 246.0 | 220.1 | 2,773.5 |
| Mean daily sunshine hours | 7.1 | 7.9 | 8.0 | 9.2 | 9.2 | 7.3 | 5.8 | 5.7 | 7.3 | 8.4 | 8.2 | 7.1 | 7.6 |
| Mean daily daylight hours | 10.6 | 11.2 | 12.0 | 12.9 | 13.6 | 13.9 | 13.8 | 13.1 | 12.3 | 11.5 | 10.7 | 10.3 | 12.2 |
| Percentage possible sunshine | 67 | 71 | 67 | 71 | 68 | 53 | 42 | 44 | 59 | 73 | 77 | 69 | 63 |
| Average ultraviolet index | 3 | 5 | 6 | 7 | 9 | 9 | 8 | 7 | 6 | 5 | 4 | 3 | 6 |
Source: India Meteorological Department (sun 1971–2000); Time and Date (dewpoints, 2005–2015) Revised Rainfall data Weather Atlas (UV Index)(Daylight)

Average Barometric Pressure & Wind Speed of Delhi
| Month | Jan | Feb | Mar | Apr | May | Jun | Jul | Aug | Sep | Oct | Nov | Dec | Year |
|---|---|---|---|---|---|---|---|---|---|---|---|---|---|
| Average Atmospheric pressure milibars (inHg) | 1,017.0 millibars (30.03 inHg) | 1,014.5 millibars (29.96 inHg) | 1,010.6 millibars (29.84 inHg) | 1,005.4 millibars (29.69 inHg) | 1,000.5 millibars (29.54 inHg) | 996.7 millibars (29.43 inHg) | 996.9 millibars (29.44 inHg) | 999.4 millibars (29.51 inHg) | 1,003.4 millibars (29.63 inHg) | 1,009.6 millibars (29.81 inHg) | 1,013.6 millibars (29.93 inHg) | 1,016.1 millibars (30.01 inHg) | 1,007.0 millibars (29.74 inHg) |
| Average Wind Speed kilometres per hour (mph) | 8.3 kilometres per hour (5.2 mph) | 9.4 kilometres per hour (5.8 mph) | 9.5 kilometres per hour (5.9 mph) | 10.0 kilometres per hour (6.2 mph) | 10.2 kilometres per hour (6.3 mph) | 10.6 kilometres per hour (6.6 mph) | 9.5 kilometres per hour (5.9 mph) | 8.8 kilometres per hour (5.5 mph) | 8.3 kilometres per hour (5.2 mph) | 6.7 kilometres per hour (4.2 mph) | 7.6 kilometres per hour (4.7 mph) | 7.7 kilometres per hour (4.8 mph) | 8.9 kilometres per hour (5.5 mph) |

Climate data for New Delhi (Indira Gandhi International Airport, Palam) 1991–2020 normals, extremes 1952–present
| Month | Jan | Feb | Mar | Apr | May | Jun | Jul | Aug | Sep | Oct | Nov | Dec | Year |
|---|---|---|---|---|---|---|---|---|---|---|---|---|---|
| Record high °C (°F) | 31.0 (87.8) | 35.7 (96.3) | 41.3 (106.3) | 45.3 (113.5) | 48.4 (119.1) | 48.0 (118.4) | 45.7 (114.3) | 43.2 (109.8) | 40.8 (105.4) | 39.6 (103.3) | 36.4 (97.5) | 30.4 (86.7) | 48.4 (119.1) |
| Mean maximum °C (°F) | 26.1 (79.0) | 29.5 (85.1) | 36.4 (97.5) | 42.6 (108.7) | 45.3 (113.5) | 44.9 (112.8) | 40.9 (105.6) | 38.2 (100.8) | 37.8 (100.0) | 36.8 (98.2) | 32.7 (90.9) | 27.4 (81.3) | 45.3 (113.5) |
| Mean daily maximum °C (°F) | 19.9 (67.8) | 24.1 (75.4) | 30.0 (86.0) | 37.1 (98.8) | 40.7 (105.3) | 39.6 (103.3) | 36.0 (96.8) | 34.5 (94.1) | 34.4 (93.9) | 33.3 (91.9) | 28.3 (82.9) | 22.7 (72.9) | 31.7 (89.1) |
| Daily mean °C (°F) | 13.3 (55.9) | 17.6 (63.7) | 23.4 (74.1) | 29.8 (85.6) | 33.6 (92.5) | 33.5 (92.3) | 31.2 (88.2) | 30.2 (86.4) | 29.8 (85.6) | 26.6 (79.9) | 20.7 (69.3) | 14.8 (58.6) | 25.4 (77.7) |
| Mean daily minimum °C (°F) | 7.3 (45.1) | 10.6 (51.1) | 15.4 (59.7) | 21.7 (71.1) | 26.4 (79.5) | 27.9 (82.2) | 27.4 (81.3) | 26.4 (79.5) | 24.9 (76.8) | 19.9 (67.8) | 13.7 (56.7) | 9.0 (48.2) | 19.2 (66.6) |
| Mean minimum °C (°F) | 3.6 (38.5) | 6.2 (43.2) | 9.7 (49.5) | 15.3 (59.5) | 20.8 (69.4) | 22.3 (72.1) | 24.1 (75.4) | 23.3 (73.9) | 21.7 (71.1) | 15.6 (60.1) | 9.0 (48.2) | 4.6 (40.3) | 3.3 (37.9) |
| Record low °C (°F) | −2.2 (28.0) | −1.6 (29.1) | 3.4 (38.1) | 8.6 (47.5) | 14.6 (58.3) | 19.8 (67.6) | 17.8 (64.0) | 20.2 (68.4) | 13.6 (56.5) | 9.9 (49.8) | 2.1 (35.8) | −1.3 (29.7) | −2.2 (28.0) |
| Average rainfall mm (inches) | 18.1 (0.71) | 19.3 (0.76) | 15.2 (0.60) | 13.6 (0.54) | 30.2 (1.19) | 68.8 (2.71) | 205.7 (8.10) | 214.2 (8.43) | 109.5 (4.31) | 12.7 (0.50) | 5.5 (0.22) | 6.4 (0.25) | 719.2 (28.32) |
| Average rainy days | 1.4 | 1.6 | 1.4 | 1.2 | 2.7 | 4.0 | 8.9 | 9.4 | 5.0 | 0.8 | 0.4 | 0.4 | 37.2 |
| Average relative humidity (%) (at 17:30 IST) | 56 | 48 | 36 | 24 | 25 | 42 | 62 | 67 | 59 | 43 | 44 | 54 | 47 |
Source 1: India Meteorological Department
Source 2: Tokyo Climate Center (mean temperatures 1991–2020)

Climate data for New Delhi (Ayanagar) 1971–2020, extremes 1967–present
| Month | Jan | Feb | Mar | Apr | May | Jun | Jul | Aug | Sep | Oct | Nov | Dec | Year |
|---|---|---|---|---|---|---|---|---|---|---|---|---|---|
| Record high °C (°F) | 29.7 (85.5) | 33.2 (91.8) | 40.6 (105.1) | 45.0 (113.0) | 47.6 (117.7) | 47.0 (116.6) | 44.8 (112.6) | 42.7 (108.9) | 41.0 (105.8) | 39.4 (102.9) | 36.4 (97.5) | 30.2 (86.4) | 47.4 (117.3) |
| Mean maximum °C (°F) | 25.2 (77.4) | 29.4 (84.9) | 36.2 (97.2) | 42.8 (109.0) | 45.9 (114.6) | 45.6 (114.1) | 41.5 (106.7) | 38.3 (100.9) | 37.2 (99.0) | 36.2 (97.2) | 32.2 (90.0) | 27.7 (81.9) | 46.2 (115.2) |
| Mean daily maximum °C (°F) | 19.2 (66.6) | 24.3 (75.7) | 30.7 (87.3) | 36.8 (98.2) | 41.2 (106.2) | 40.5 (104.9) | 35.7 (96.3) | 34.3 (93.7) | 34.2 (93.6) | 33.4 (92.1) | 28.3 (82.9) | 22.2 (72.0) | 31.7 (89.1) |
| Mean daily minimum °C (°F) | 7.7 (45.9) | 11.0 (51.8) | 15.4 (59.7) | 21.0 (69.8) | 25.5 (77.9) | 27.1 (80.8) | 26.5 (79.7) | 25.8 (78.4) | 24.2 (75.6) | 19.5 (67.1) | 14.2 (57.6) | 8.3 (46.9) | 18.9 (66.0) |
| Mean minimum °C (°F) | 3.6 (38.5) | 6.8 (44.2) | 10.5 (50.9) | 16.3 (61.3) | 19.7 (67.5) | 20.6 (69.1) | 22.8 (73.0) | 23.1 (73.6) | 21.5 (70.7) | 14.5 (58.1) | 9.8 (49.6) | 3.2 (37.8) | 2.9 (37.2) |
| Record low °C (°F) | −1.3 (29.7) | 0.0 (32.0) | 3.8 (38.8) | 8.4 (47.1) | 13.8 (56.8) | 18.0 (64.4) | 19.8 (67.6) | 21.3 (70.3) | 14.0 (57.2) | 9.4 (48.9) | 3.2 (37.8) | −0.5 (31.1) | −1.3 (29.7) |
| Average rainfall mm (inches) | 18.0 (0.71) | 19.8 (0.78) | 21.6 (0.85) | 10.7 (0.42) | 31.1 (1.22) | 69.9 (2.75) | 182.2 (7.17) | 188.4 (7.42) | 106.1 (4.18) | 13.8 (0.54) | 2.1 (0.08) | 5.4 (0.21) | 669.1 (26.33) |
| Average rainy days | 1.6 | 1.6 | 2.1 | 1.0 | 2.8 | 4.5 | 8.5 | 8.6 | 4.7 | 0.6 | 0.3 | 0.4 | 36.7 |
| Average relative humidity (%) (at 17:30 IST) | 64 | 52 | 40 | 26 | 24 | 37 | 64 | 68 | 63 | 50 | 52 | 58 | 51 |
Source: India Meteorological Department February record high

Climate data for New Delhi (Delhi Ridge) 1991–2020, extremes 1971–present
| Month | Jan | Feb | Mar | Apr | May | Jun | Jul | Aug | Sep | Oct | Nov | Dec | Year |
|---|---|---|---|---|---|---|---|---|---|---|---|---|---|
| Record high °C (°F) | 27.5 (81.5) | 34.2 (93.6) | 40.9 (105.6) | 45.7 (114.3) | 47.5 (117.5) | 47.9 (118.2) | 42.5 (108.5) | 40.4 (104.7) | 38.4 (101.1) | 38.4 (101.1) | 34.2 (93.6) | 29.8 (85.6) | 47.9 (118.2) |
| Mean maximum °C (°F) | 24.4 (75.9) | 29.6 (85.3) | 36.4 (97.5) | 42.8 (109.0) | 45.7 (114.3) | 44.8 (112.6) | 40.4 (104.7) | 37.7 (99.9) | 36.8 (98.2) | 36.4 (97.5) | 32.5 (90.5) | 27.2 (81.0) | 45.9 (114.6) |
| Mean daily maximum °C (°F) | 19.0 (66.2) | 24.4 (75.9) | 31.0 (87.8) | 37.0 (98.6) | 40.7 (105.3) | 39.8 (103.6) | 35.1 (95.2) | 33.9 (93.0) | 34.0 (93.2) | 33.4 (92.1) | 28.0 (82.4) | 22.5 (72.5) | 31.4 (88.5) |
| Mean daily minimum °C (°F) | 8.7 (47.7) | 12.1 (53.8) | 16.8 (62.2) | 22.0 (71.6) | 25.9 (78.6) | 27.0 (80.6) | 26.1 (79.0) | 25.5 (77.9) | 24.1 (75.4) | 20.3 (68.5) | 15.1 (59.2) | 9.9 (49.8) | 19.2 (66.6) |
| Mean minimum °C (°F) | 5.4 (41.7) | 9.0 (48.2) | 12.0 (53.6) | 17.4 (63.3) | 20.7 (69.3) | 21.3 (70.3) | 22.7 (72.9) | 23.2 (73.8) | 21.5 (70.7) | 17.0 (62.6) | 11.5 (52.7) | 5.3 (41.5) | 4.7 (40.5) |
| Record low °C (°F) | 1.5 (34.7) | 7.0 (44.6) | 10.2 (50.4) | 11.6 (52.9) | 14.2 (57.6) | 16.7 (62.1) | 21.0 (69.8) | 21.6 (70.9) | 19.0 (66.2) | 12.4 (54.3) | 9.7 (49.5) | 3.5 (38.3) | 1.5 (34.7) |
| Average rainfall mm (inches) | 20.1 (0.79) | 19.5 (0.77) | 17.8 (0.70) | 7.6 (0.30) | 34.0 (1.34) | 60.7 (2.39) | 190.1 (7.48) | 190.2 (7.49) | 119.3 (4.70) | 26.5 (1.04) | 2.1 (0.08) | 6.1 (0.24) | 694 (27.32) |
| Average rainy days | 1.9 | 1.5 | 1.3 | 1.1 | 2.4 | 3.9 | 8.3 | 9.4 | 5.2 | 0.5 | 0.3 | 0.5 | 36.3 |
| Average relative humidity (%) (at 17:30 IST) | 66 | 54 | 41 | 29 | 31 | 44 | 71 | 76 | 68 | 55 | 54 | 62 | 55 |
Source: India Meteorological Department February record high

=== Air quality ===
In Mercer's 2015 annual quality-of-living survey, New Delhi ranks at number 154 out of 230 cities due to bad air quality and pollution. The World Health Organization ranked New Delhi as the world's worst polluted city in 2014 among about 1,600 cities the organisation tracked around the world. In 2016, United States Environmental Protection Agency listed New Delhi as the most polluted city on Earth and IQAir listed New Delhi as the world's most polluted capital city for the second straight year in year 2019.

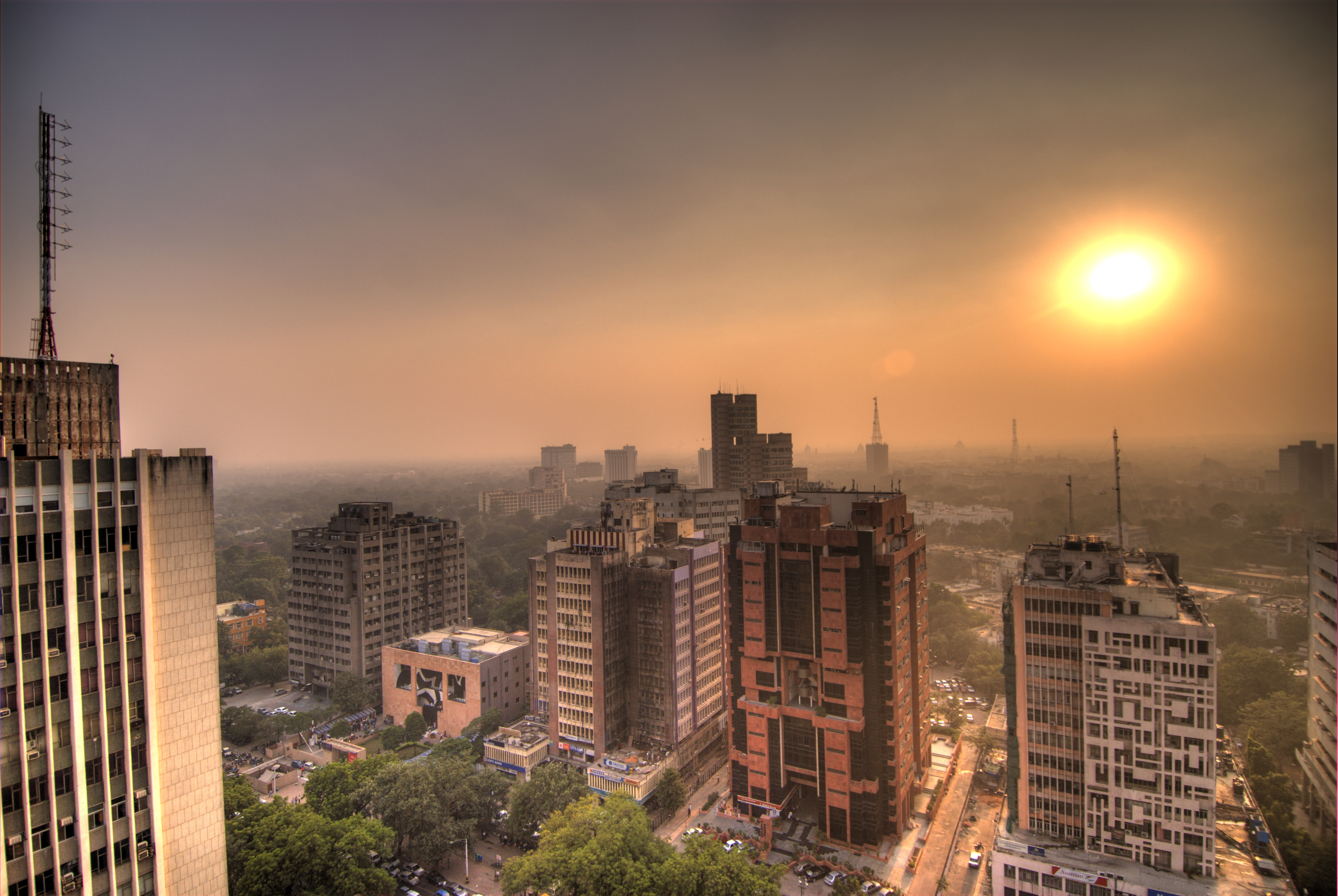
Dense smog at Connaught Place, New Delhi

In an attempt to lessen air pollution in New Delhi, which gets worse during the winter, a temporary alternate-day travel scheme for cars using the odd- and even-numbered licence plates system was announced by the Delhi government in December 2015. In addition, trucks were to be allowed to enter India's capital only after 11 pm, two hours later than the existing restriction. The driving restriction scheme was planned to be implemented as a trial from 1 January 2016 for an initial period of 15 days. The restriction was in force between 8 am and 8 pm, and traffic was not restricted on Sundays. Public transportation service was increased during the restriction period.

On 16 December 2015, the Supreme Court of India mandated several restrictions on Delhi's transportation system to curb pollution. Among the measures, the court ordered to stop registrations of diesel cars and sport utility vehicles with an engine capacity of 2,000 cc and over until 31 March 2016. The court also ordered all taxis in the Delhi region to switch to compressed natural gas by 1 March 2016. Transportation vehicles that are more than 10 years old were banned from entering the capital.

Analysing real-time vehicle speed data from Uber Delhi revealed that during the odd-even program, average speeds went up by a statistically significant 5.4 per cent (2.8 standard deviations from normal). This means vehicles have less idling time in traffic and vehicle engines would run closer to minimum fuel consumption. In bordering areas, PM 2.5 levels were recorded more than 400 (ug/m3) while in inner areas in Delhi, they were recorded between 150 and 210 on an average. However, the sub-city of Dwarka, located in the southwest district, has a substantially low level of air pollution. At NSUT, located in Sector 3, Dwarka, pollution levels were as low as 93 PPM.

On 7 November 2017, the Indian Medical Association declared a public health emergency due to high pollution levels. The highest being in the Punjabi Bagh district with an air quality index of 999 and in the RK Puram district with an index of 852. The lowest index recorded was in the Anand Vihar district with an index of 319. Levels of PM2.5 were recorded at 710 μg/m^{3}, more than 11 times the World Health Organization's safe limit.

In a 2018 study, New Delhi was found to be the most polluted capital out of 61 capital cities around the world. In December 2019, IIT Bombay, in partnership with the McKelvey School of Engineering of Washington University in St. Louis, launched the Aerosol and Air Quality Research Facility to study air pollution in New Delhi, among other Indian cities. During the COVID-19 pandemic lockdown in India, the water quality of the Yamuna and Ganges river basins have improved as industries are closed due to the lockdown. The air quality has also significantly improved during the lockdown. On 5 November 2020, New Delhi recorded its most toxic day in a year, as the concentration of poisonous PM2.5 particles was recorded at 14 times the WHO's safe limit.

Typically, November is the month with the worst air quality.

2015 Air pollution in New Delhi (PM2.5 AQI) Hazardous Very Unhealthy Unhealthy Unhealthy for Sensitive Groups Moderate Good

| Month | January | February | March | April | May | June | July | August | September | October | November | December |
|---|---|---|---|---|---|---|---|---|---|---|---|---|
| Average Air quality index | 201–300 (Poor) | 201–300 (Poor) | 101–200 (Moderate) | 101–200 (Moderate) | 101–200 (Moderate) | 101–200 (Moderate) | 51–100 (Satisfactory) | 51–100 (Satisfactory) | 51–100 (Satisfactory) | 401–500 (Severe) | 401–500 (Severe) | 301–400 (Very Poor) |

== Demographics ==
As of 2011, the New Delhi Municipal Council area has a population of 249,998. Hindi is the most widely spoken language in New Delhi and the lingua franca of the city. English is primarily used as the formal language by business and government institutes. New Delhi has a literacy rate of 89.38% according to 2011 census, which is the highest in Delhi.

Historical population
| Year | Pop. | ±% |
|---|---|---|
| 1931 | 73,653 | — |
| 1941 | 93,733 | +27.3% |
| 1951 | 276,314 | +194.8% |
| 1961 | 261,545 | −5.3% |
| 1971 | 301,801 | +15.4% |
| 1981 | 273,036 | −9.5% |
| 1991 | 301,297 | +10.4% |
| 2001 | 302,363 | +0.4% |
| 2011 | 257,803 | −14.7% |
Source: Government of India

=== Religion ===
Religion in New Delhi (NDMC)
| Religion | Percent |
| Hinduism | 89.82% |
| Islam | 4.50% |
| Christianity | 2.93% |
| Sikhism | 1.97% |
| Jainism | 0.42% |
| Others | 0.36% |

According to 2011 census, Hinduism is the religion of 89.8% of New Delhi's population. There are also communities of Muslims (4.5%), Christians (2.9%), Sikhs (2.0%), Jains (0.4%). Other religious groups include Parsis, Buddhists, and Jews.

Religious buildings in New Delhi

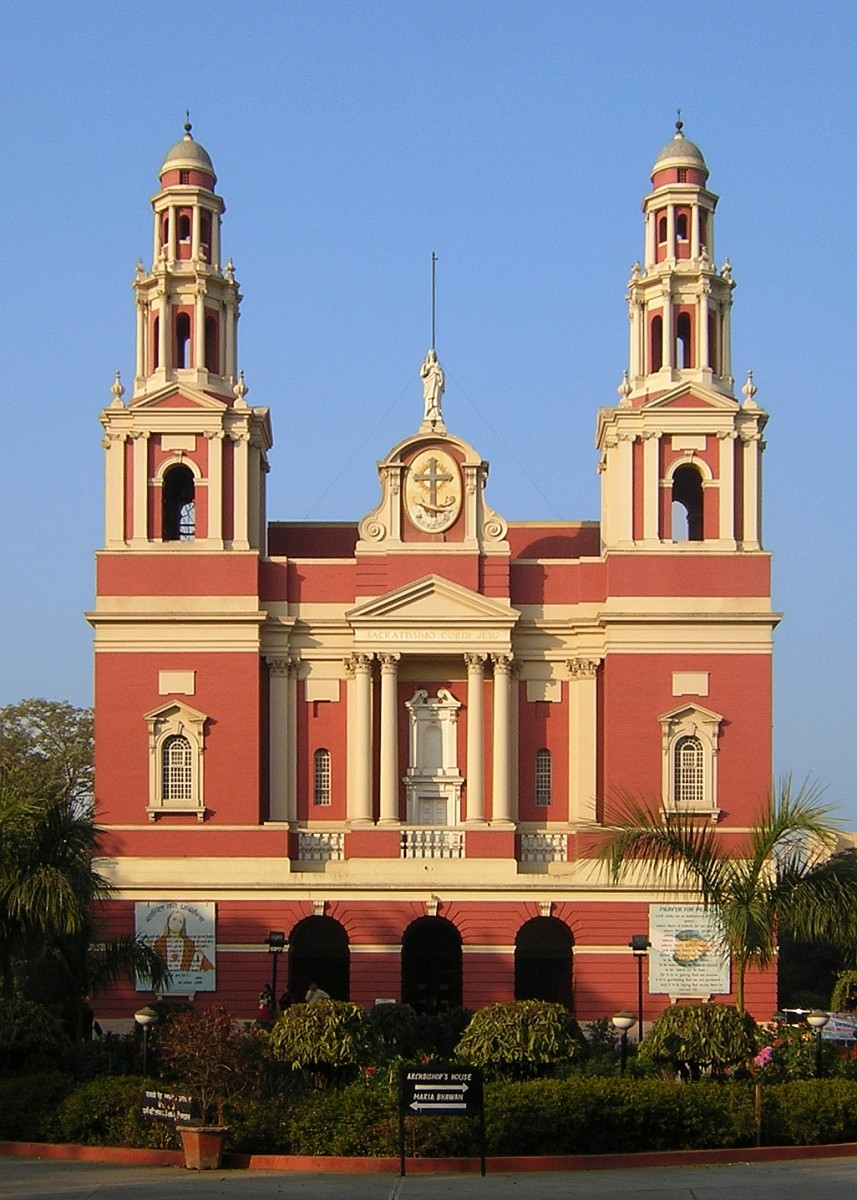
Sacred Heart Cathedral, designed by Henry Medd based on Italian architecture

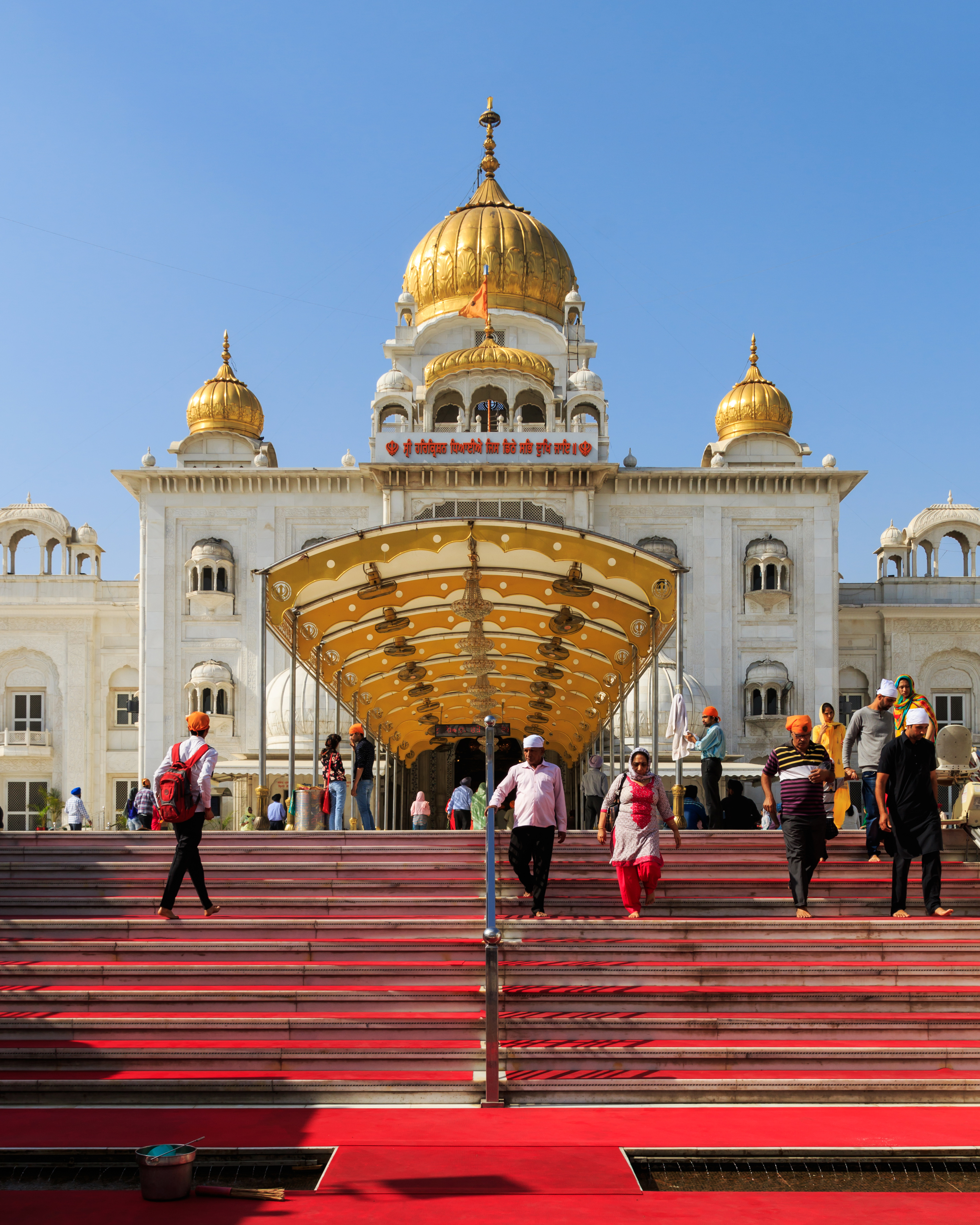
Gurudwara Bangla Sahib,
a Sikh Gurdwara

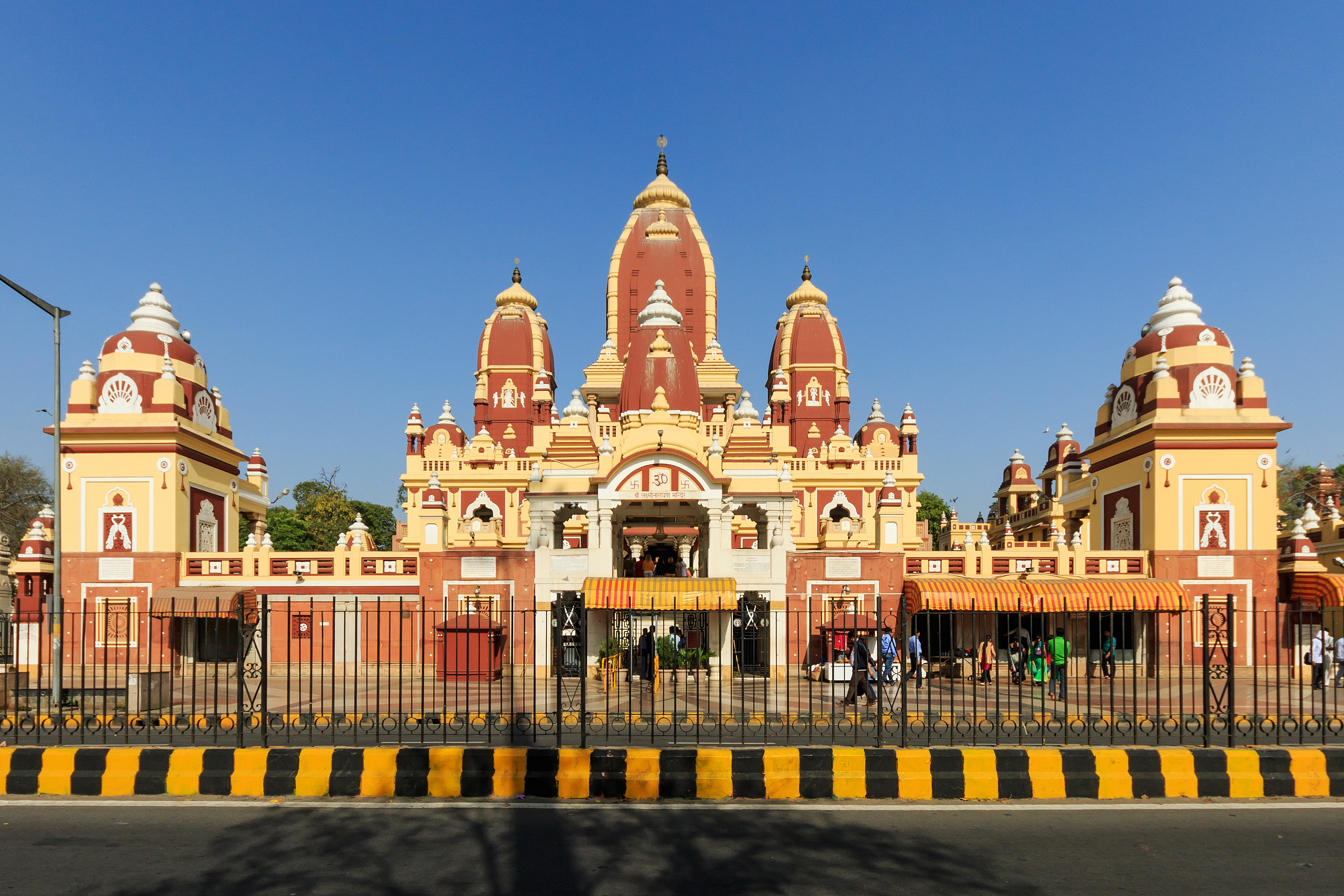
Laxminarayan Temple,
a Hindu Mandir

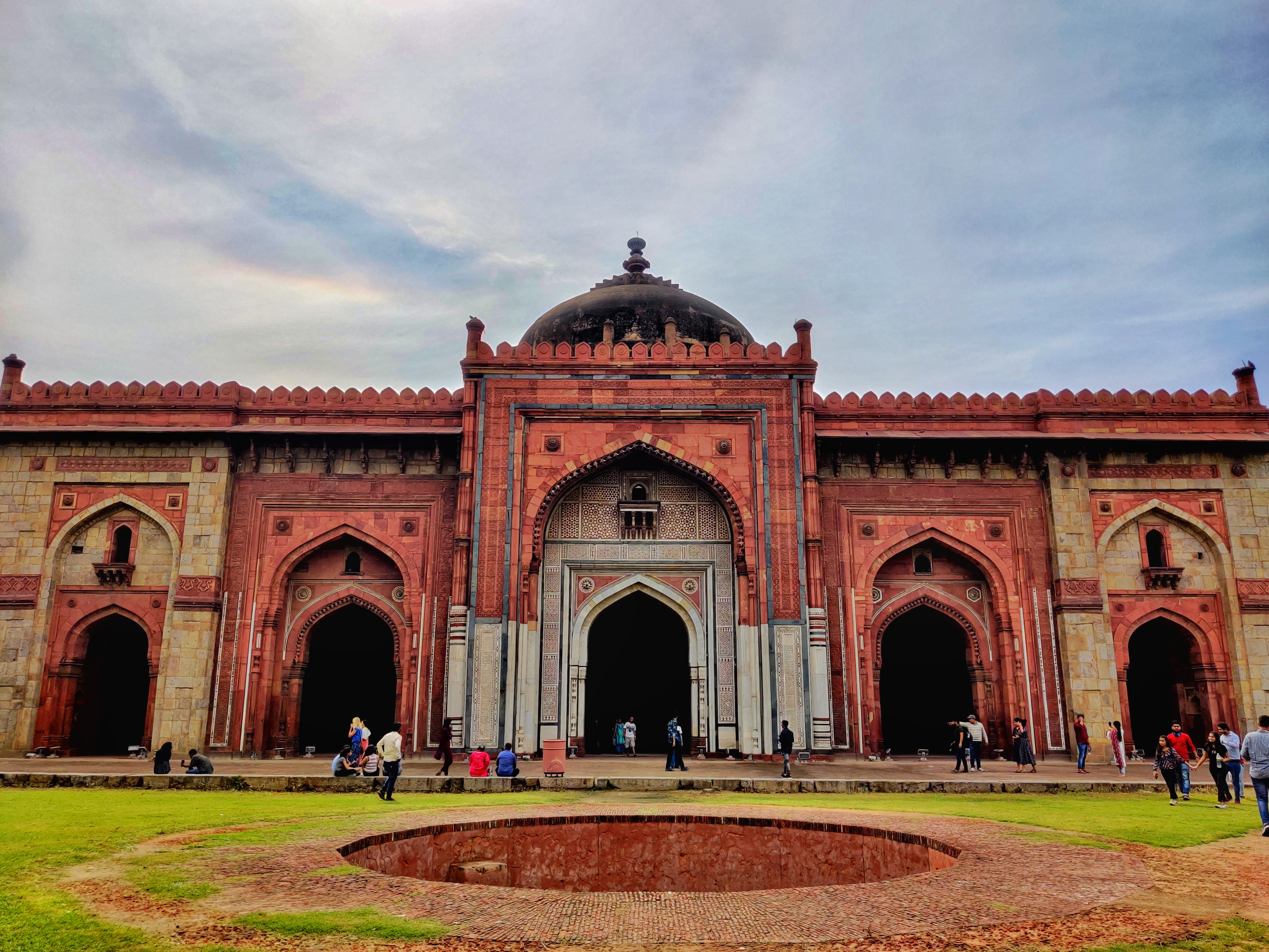
Qila-i-Kuhna Mosque inside Old Fort,
a mosque

== Government ==
The national capital of India, New Delhi is jointly administered by both the Central Government of India and the local Government of Delhi, it is also the capital of the National Capital Territory (NCT) of Delhi.

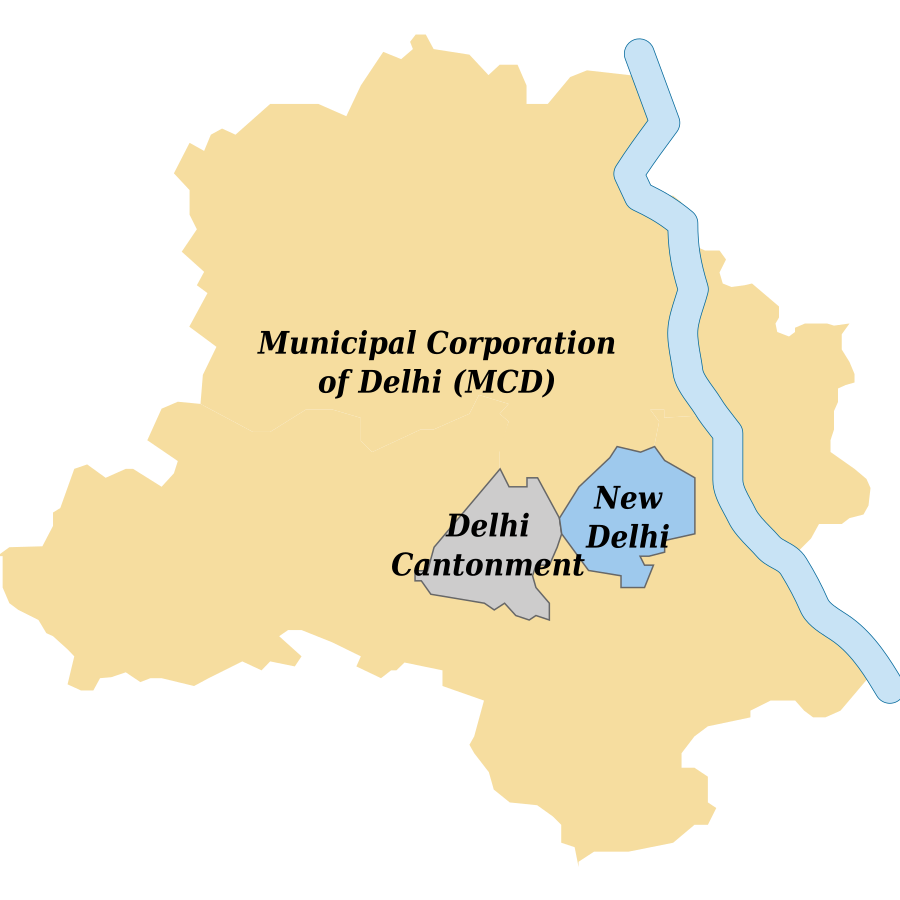
Municipalities of Delhi

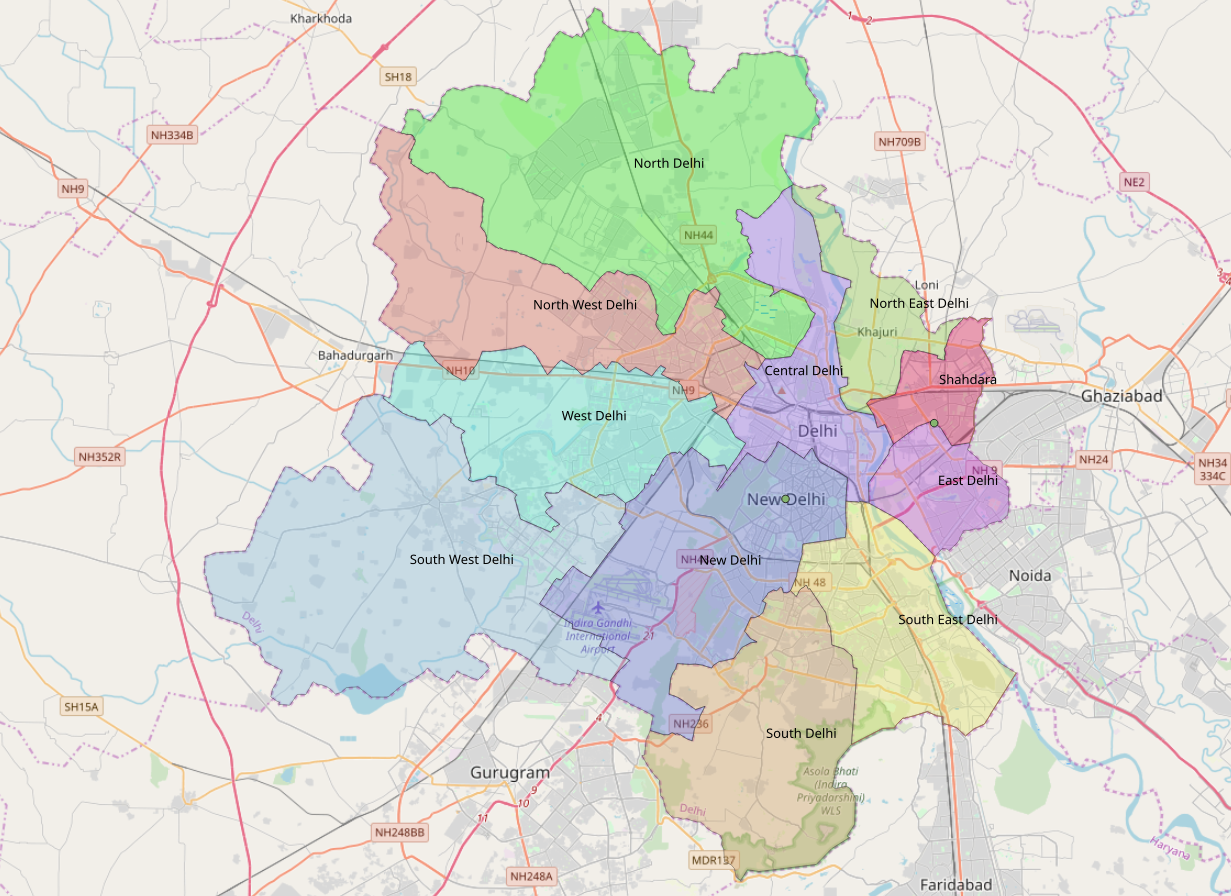
The district of New Delhi within the NCT

New Delhi is administered through a municipal government, known as the New Delhi Municipal Council (NDMC) except for the Delhi Cantonment area. The other urban areas of the metropolis of Delhi are administered by the Municipal Corporation of Delhi and Delhi Cantonment Board. As of 2015, the government structure of the New Delhi Municipal Council includes a chairperson, three members of New Delhi's Legislative Assembly, two members nominated by the Chief Minister of the NCT of Delhi and five members nominated by the central government.

The districts of the NCT were redrawn in 2012 and include a district called New Delhi, albeit with different borders than the municipality. The New Delhi district includes not only the area of the municipality of the same name but also encompasses the Delhi Cantonment and parts of the Municipal Corporation of Delhi area.

== Economy ==
New Delhi is the largest commercial city in northern India. It has an estimated net State Domestic Product (FY 2010) of ₹1,595 billion (US$17 billion) in nominal terms and ~₹6,800 billion (US$73 billion) in PPP terms. As of 2013, the per capita income of Delhi was Rs. 230000, second highest in India after Goa. GSDP in Delhi at the prices for 2012–13 is estimated at Rs 3.88 trillion (short scale) against Rs 3.11 trillion (short scale) in 2011–12.

Connaught Place, one of North India's largest commercial and financial centres, is located in the northern part of New Delhi. Adjoining areas such as Barakhamba Road, ITO are also major commercial centres. The government and quasi-government sector was the primary employer in New Delhi. The city's service sector has expanded due in part to the large skilled English-speaking workforce that has attracted many multinational companies. Key service industries include information technology, telecommunications, hotels, banking, media, and tourism.

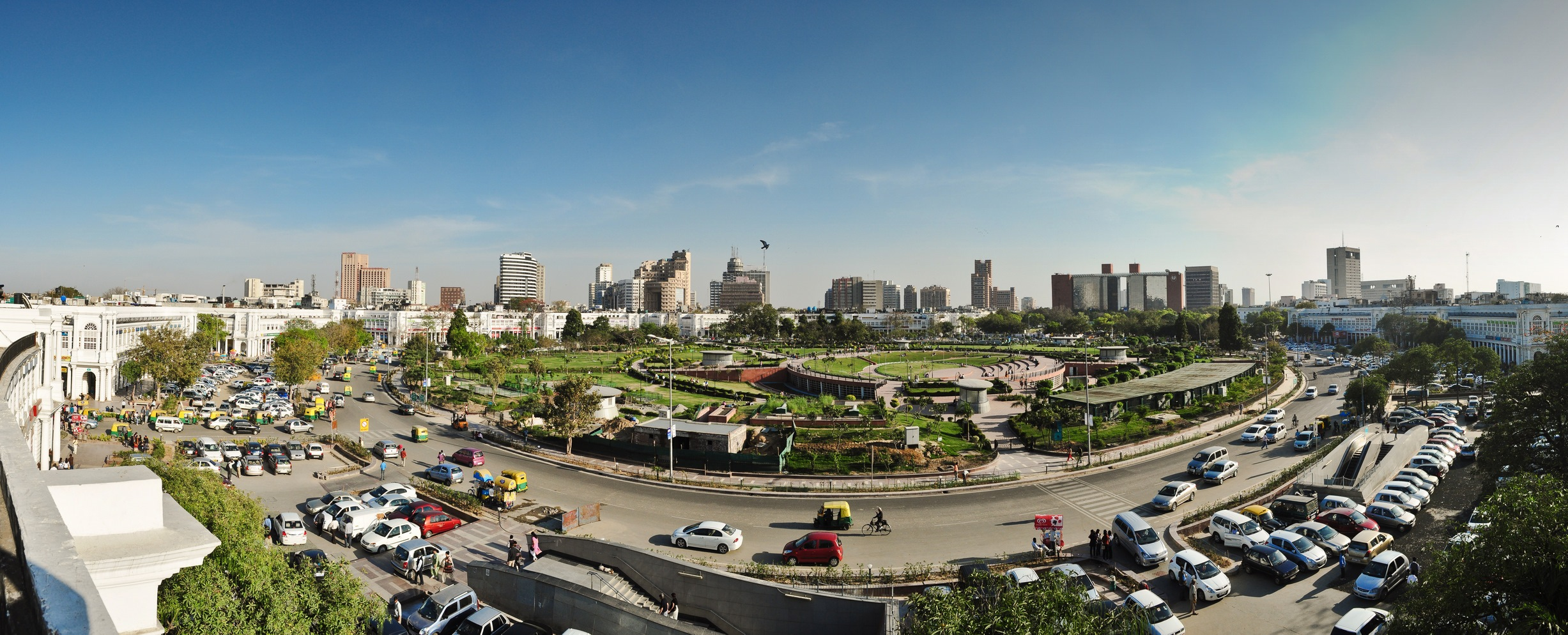
Connaught Place in Delhi is an important economic hub of the National Capital Region.

The 2011 World Wealth Report ranks economic activity in New Delhi at 39, but overall the capital is ranked at 37, above cities like Jakarta and Johannesburg. New Delhi, with Beijing, shares the top position as the most targeted emerging markets retail destination among Asia-Pacific markets.

The government of the National Capital Territory of Delhi does not release any economic figures specifically for New Delhi but publishes an official economic report on the whole of Delhi annually. According to the Economic Survey of Delhi, the metropolis has a net State Domestic Product (SDP) of Rs. 830.85 billion (for the year 2004–05) and a per capita income of Rs. 53,976 ($1,200). In the year 2008–09 New Delhi had a per capita Income of Rs. 116,886 ($2,595). It grew by 16.2% to reach Rs. 135,814 ($3,018) in 2009–10 fiscal. New Delhi's per capita GDP (at PPP) was at $6,860 during 2009–10 fiscal, making it one of the richest cities in India. The tertiary sector contributes 78.4% of Delhi's gross SDP followed by secondary and primary sectors with 20.2% and 1.4% contribution respectively.

The gross state domestic product (GSDP) of Delhi at prices for the year 2011–12 has been estimated at Rs 3.13 trillion (short scale), which is an increase of 18.7 per cent over the previous fiscal.

== Culture ==
New Delhi is a cosmopolitan city due to the multi-ethnic and multi-cultural presence of the vast Indian bureaucracy and political system. The city's capital status has amplified the importance of national events and holidays. National events such as Republic Day, Independence Day and Gandhi Jayanti (Gandhi's birthday) are celebrated with great enthusiasm in New Delhi and the rest of India. On India's Independence Day (15 August), the prime minister of India addresses the nation from the Red Fort. Most Delhiites celebrate the day by flying kites, which are considered a symbol of freedom. The Republic Day Parade is a large cultural and military parade showcasing India's cultural diversity and military might.

Religious festivals include Diwali (the festival of light), Maha Shivaratri, Teej, Durga Puja, Chhath Puja, Mahavir Jayanti, Guru Nanak Jayanti, Holi, Lohri, Eid ul-Fitr, Eid ul-Adha, Easter, Raksha Bandhan, and Christmas. The Qutub Festival is a cultural event during which performances of musicians and dancers from all over India are showcased at night, with the Qutub Minar as the chosen backdrop of the event. Other events such as Kite Flying Festival, International Mango Festival and Vasant Panchami (the Spring Festival) are held every year in Delhi.

In 2007, the Japanese Buddhist organisation Nipponzan Myohoji decided to build a Peace Pagoda in the city containing Buddha relics. It was inaugurated by the Dalai Lama.

=== Historic sites, museums and gardens ===
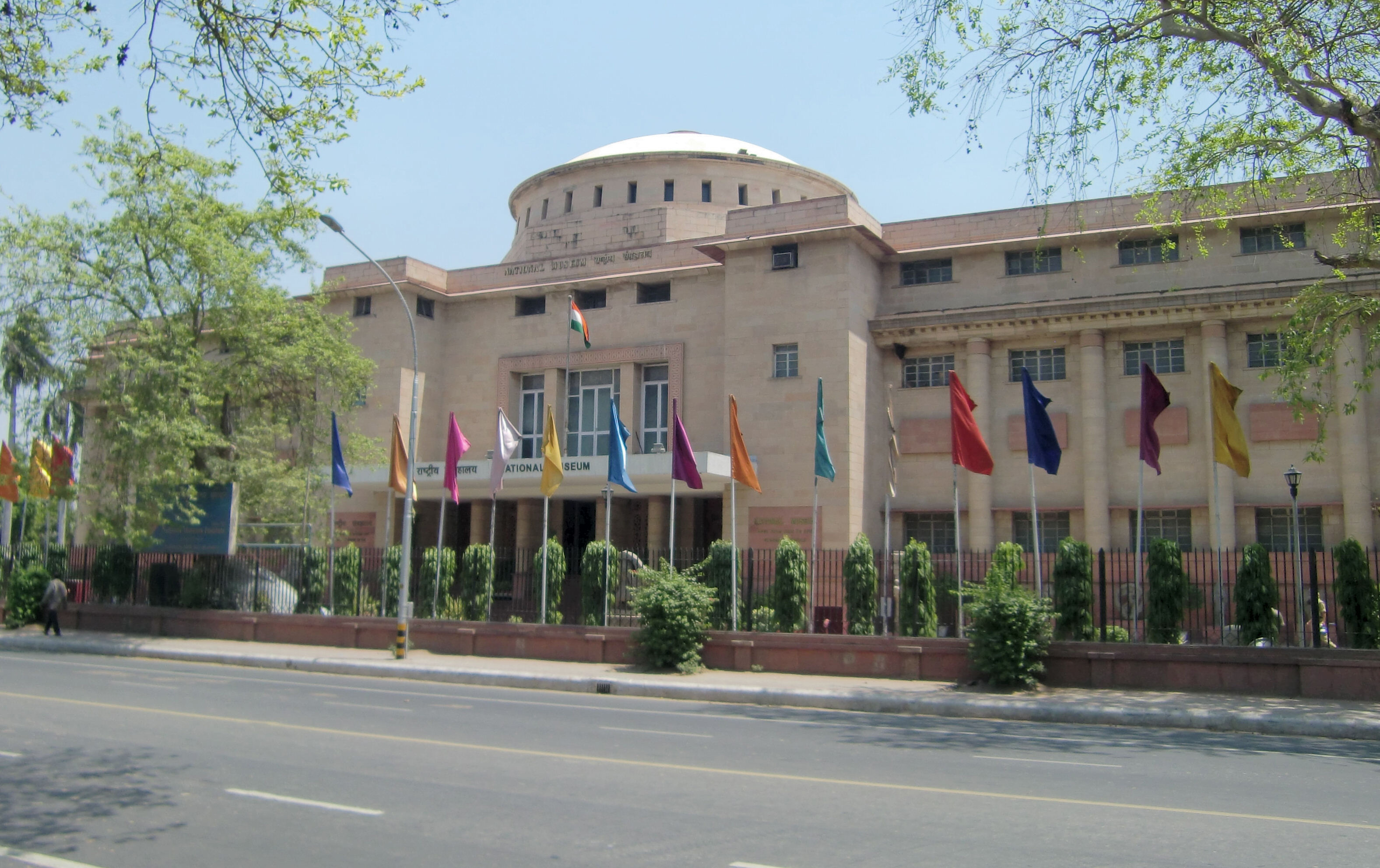
The National Museum in New Delhi is one of the largest museums in India.

New Delhi is home to several historic sites and museums. The National Museum, which began with an exhibition of Indian art and artefacts at the Royal Academy in London in the winter of 1947–48, was later at the end was shown at the Rashtrapati Bhavan in 1949. Later it was to form a permanent National Museum. On 15 August 1949, the National Museum was formally inaugurated and has 200,000 works of art, both of Indian and foreign origin, covering over 5,000 years.

The India Gate, which was built in 1931, was inspired by the Arc de Triomphe in Paris. It is the national monument of India commemorating the 90,000 soldiers of the Indian Army who died while fighting for the British Raj in World War I and the Third Anglo-Afghan War. The monument is barricaded now with entry to the inside arch restricted.

The Rajpath, which was built similar to the Champs-Élysées in Paris, is the ceremonial boulevard for the Republic of India, located in New Delhi. The annual Republic Day parade takes place here on 26 January. The Beating retreat takes place here two days later.

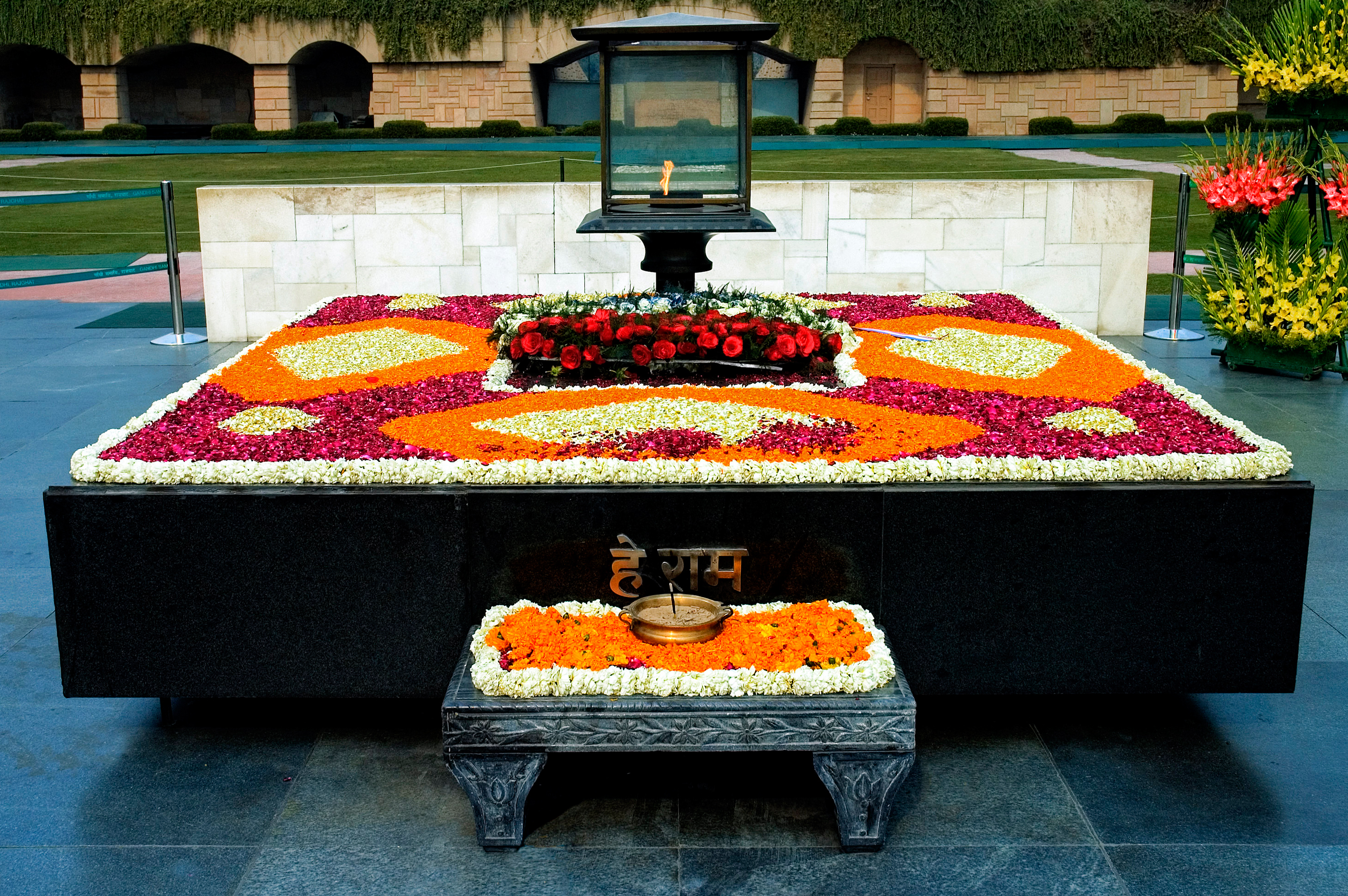
The Rajghat, the final resting place of Mahatma Gandhi

Gandhi Smriti in New Delhi is the location where Mahatma Gandhi spent the last 144 days of his life and was assassinated on 30 January 1948. Rajghat is the place where Gandhi was cremated on 31 January 1948 after his assassination and his ashes were buried and make it a final resting place beside the sanctity of the Yamuna River. The Raj Ghat in the shape of the large square platform with black marble was designed by architect Vanu Bhuta.

Jantar Mantar located in Connaught Place was built by Maharaja Jai Singh II of Jaipur. It consists of 13 architectural astronomy instruments. The primary purpose of the observatory was to compile astronomical tables, and to predict the times and movements of the sun, moon and planets.

New Delhi is home to Indira Gandhi Memorial Museum, National Gallery of Modern Art, National Museum of Natural History, National Rail Museum, National Handicrafts and Handlooms Museum, National Philatelic Museum, Nehru Planetarium, Shankar's International Dolls Museum, and the Supreme Court of India Museum.

In the coming years, a new National War Memorial and Museum will be constructed in New Delhi for ₹4,000 million (US$43 million).

New Delhi is particularly renowned for its beautifully landscaped gardens that can look quite stunning in spring. The largest of these include Buddha Jayanti Park (part of Delhi Ridge) and the historic Lodi Gardens. In addition, there are the gardens in the Presidential Estate, the gardens along the Rajpath and India Gate, the gardens along Shanti Path, the Rose Garden, Nehru Park and the Railway Garden in Chanakya Puri. Also of note is the garden adjacent to the Jangpura Metro Station near the Defence Colony Flyover, as are the roundabout and neighbourhood gardens throughout the city.

The New Delhi Municipal Council (NDMC) area was declared the cleanest in North India, based on solid waste management, access to sanitation and other parameters of cleanliness, under the zone-wise Swachh Survekshan 2017.

== Cityscape ==
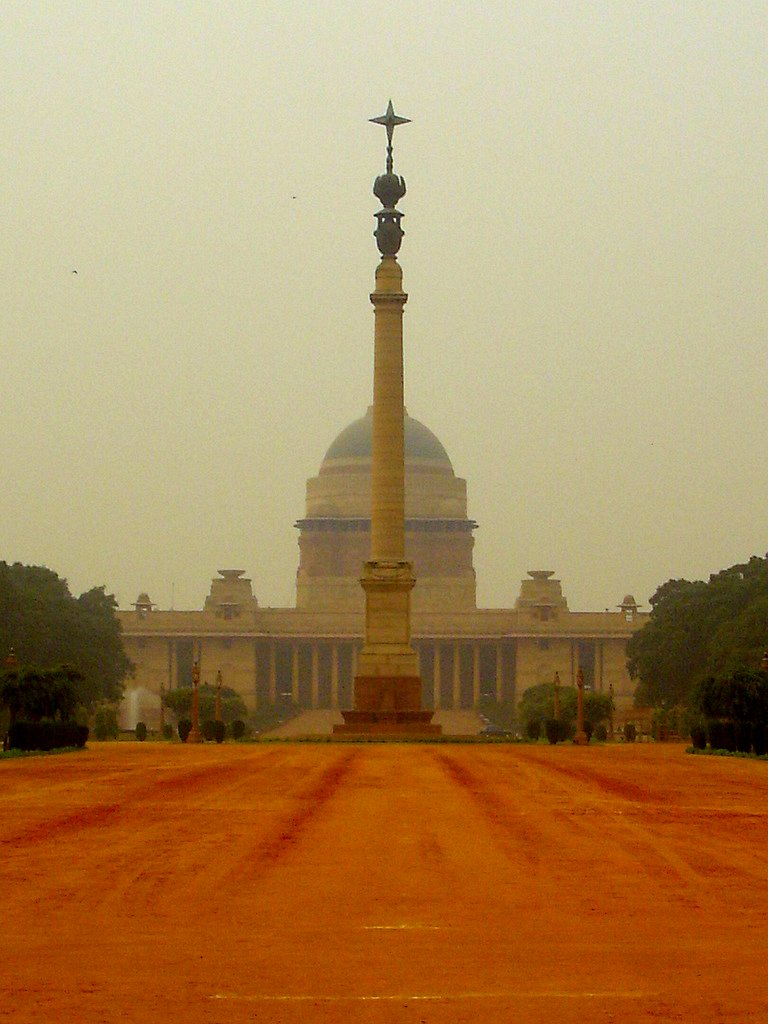
Rashtrapati Bhavan is the official residence of the President of India.

Much of New Delhi, planned by the leading 20th-century British architect Edwin Lutyens, was laid out to be the central administrative area of the city as a testament to Britain's imperial ambitions. New Delhi is structured around two central promenades called the Rajpath and the Janpath. The Rajpath, or King's Way, stretches from the Rashtrapati Bhavan to the India Gate. The Janpath (Hindi: राजपथ, lit. 'Path of the People'), formerly Queen's Way, begins at Connaught Circus and cuts the Rajpath at right angles. Nineteen foreign embassies are located on the nearby Shantipath (Hindi: शांतिपथ, lit. 'Path of Peace'), making it the largest diplomatic enclave in India.

At the heart of the city is the Rashtrapati Bhavan (formerly known as Viceroy's House) which sits atop Raisina Hill. The Secretariat, which houses ministries of the government of India, flanks out of the Rashtrapati Bhavan. The Parliament House, designed by Herbert Baker, is located at the Sansad Marg, which runs parallel to the Rajpath. Connaught Place is a large, circular commercial area in New Delhi, modelled after the Royal Crescent in England. Twelve separate roads lead out of the outer ring of Connaught Place, one of them being the Janpath.

=== Architecture ===
The New Delhi town plan, like its architecture, was chosen with one single chief consideration: to be a symbol of British power and supremacy. All other decisions were subordinate to this, and it was this framework that dictated the choice and application of symbology and influences from both Hindu and Islamic architecture.

It took about 20 years to build the city from 1911. Many elements of New Delhi architecture borrow from indigenous sources; however, they fit into a British Classical/Palladian tradition. The fact that there were any indigenous features in the design was due to the persistence and urging of both the Viceroy Hardinge and historians like E.B. Havell.

In the year 2019, Ministry of Housing and Urban Affairs and Government of India introduced the Central Vista redevelopment project proposing the redevelopment of over 440 hectares (1,100 acres), costing ₹20,000 crore (equivalent to ₹260 billion or US$2.7 billion in 2026).

== Transport ==
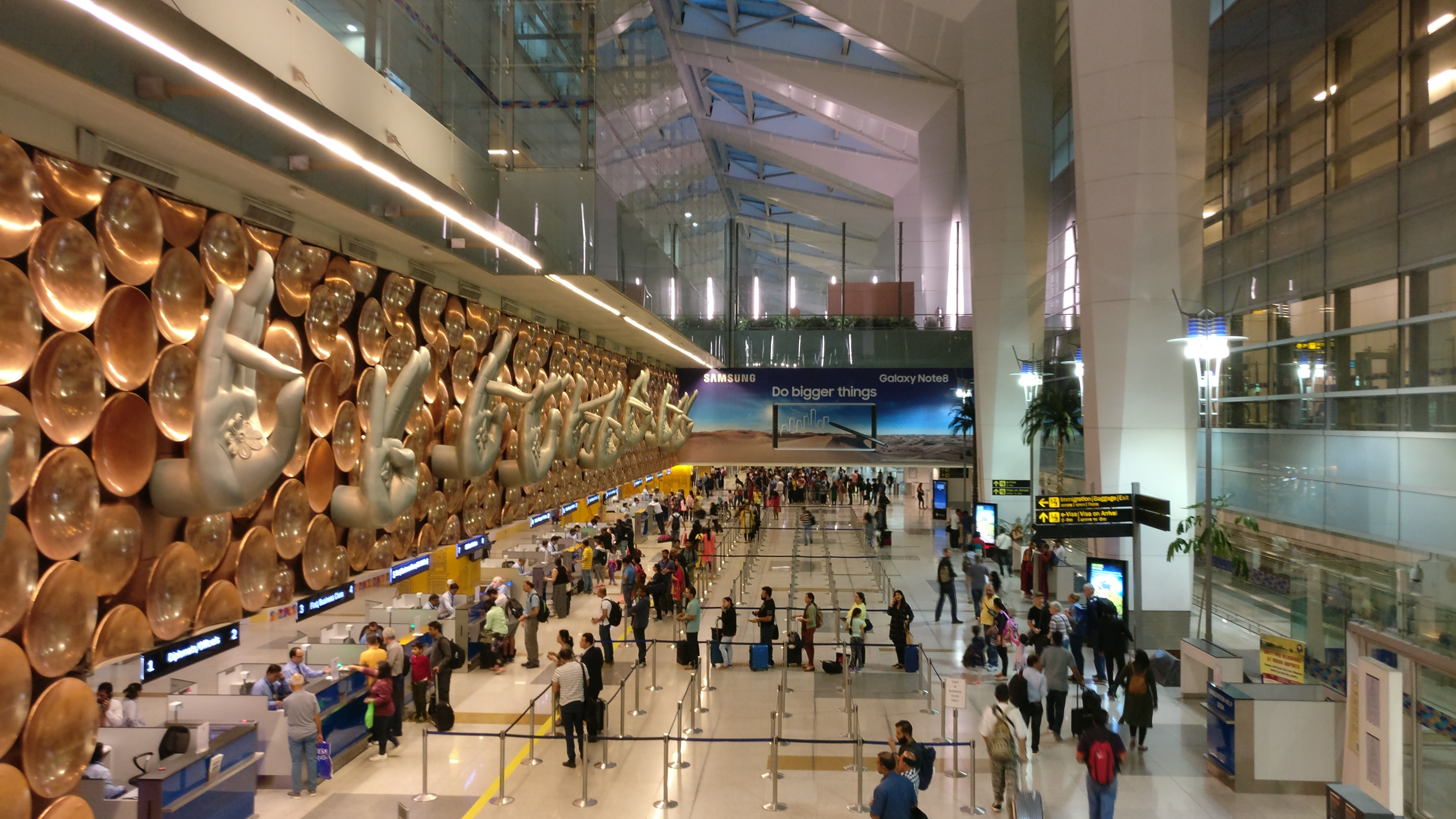
Indira Gandhi International Airport

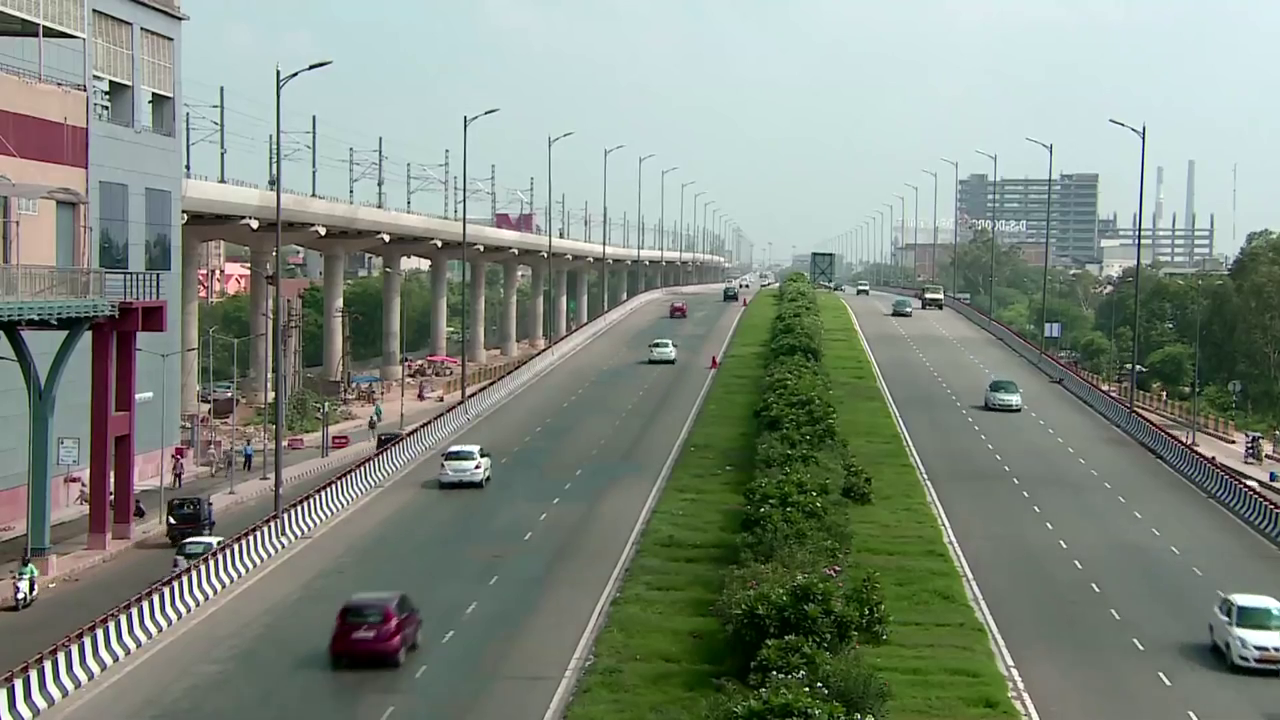
A view of Delhi Faridabad Skyway

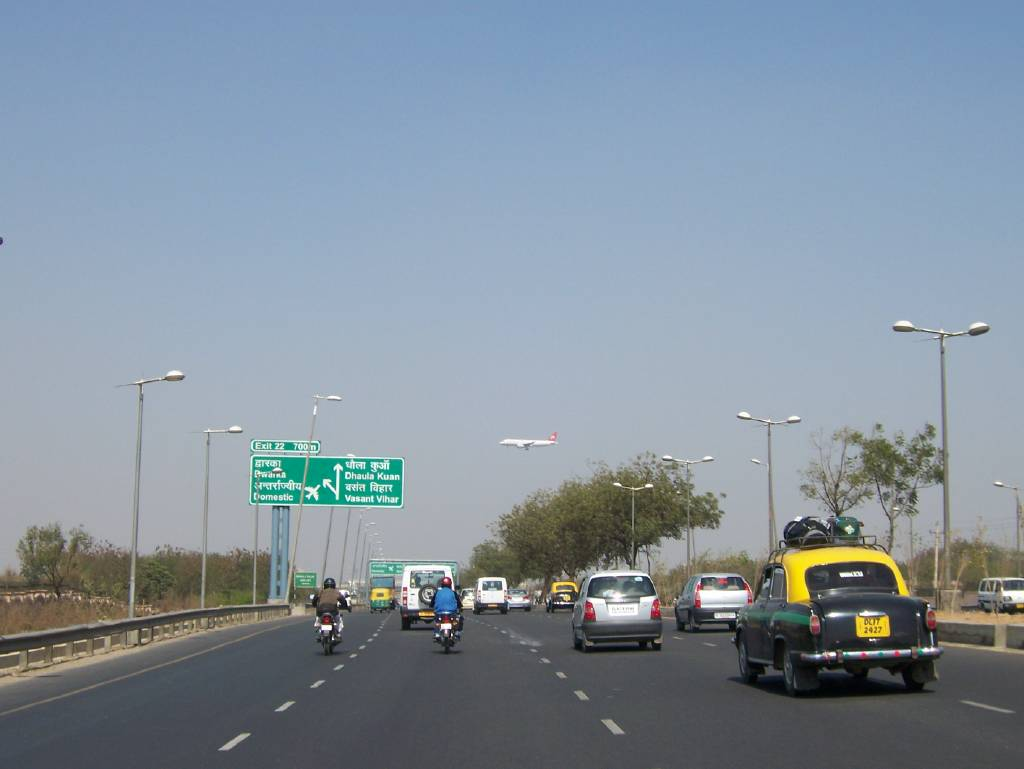
The Delhi-Gurgaon Expressway, connecting Delhi to the Indira Gandhi International Airport

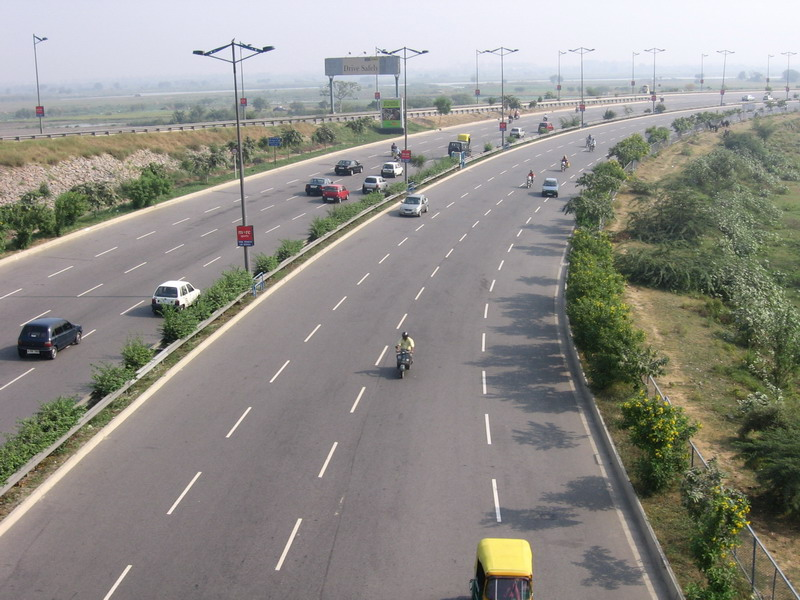
The Delhi Noida Direct Flyway (DND Flyway)

=== Air ===
Indira Gandhi International Airport, situated to the southwest of Delhi, is the main gateway for the city's domestic and international civilian air traffic. In 2012–13, the airport was used by more than 35 million passengers, making it one of the busiest airports in South Asia. Terminal 3, which cost ₹96.8 billion (US$1.0 billion) to construct between 2007 and 2010, handles an additional 37 million passengers annually.

The Delhi Flying Club, established in 1928 with two de Havilland Moth aircraft named Delhi and Roshanara, was based at Safdarjung Airport which started operations in 1929, when it was the Delhi's only airport and the second in India. The airport functioned until 2001; however, in January 2002 the government closed the airport for flying activities because of security concerns following the New York attacks in September 2001. Since then, the club only carries out aircraft maintenance courses, and is used for helicopter rides to Indira Gandhi International Airport for VIP including the president and the prime minister.

In 2010, Indira Gandhi International Airport (IGIA) was conferred the fourth best airport award in the world in the 15–25 million category, and Best Improved Airport in the Asia-Pacific Region by Airports Council International. The airport was rated as the Best airport in the world in the 25–40 million passengers category in 2015, by Airports Council International. Delhi Airport also bags two awards for The Best Airport in Central Asia/India and Best Airport Staff in Central Asia/India at the Skytrax World Airport Awards 2015.

A second airport, Noida International Airport, is built in Jewar.

=== Road ===
New Delhi has one of India's largest bus transport systems. Buses are operated by the state-owned Delhi Transport Corporation (DTC), which owns the largest fleet of compressed natural gas (CNG)-fueled buses in the world and Delhi Transit. Personal vehicles especially cars also form a major chunk of vehicles plying on New Delhi roads. New Delhi has the highest number of registered cars compared to any other metropolitan city in India. Taxis and Auto Rickshaws also ply on New Delhi roads in large numbers. New Delhi has one of the highest road density in India and average vehicle speed is around 15–20 km/h (9.3–12.4 mph) in peak hours in the city.

Some roads and expressways serve as important pillars of New Delhi's road infrastructure:

- Inner Ring Road is one of the most important "state highways" in New Delhi. It is a 51 km (32 mi) long circular road, which connects important areas in New Delhi. Owing to more than 2 dozen grade-separators/flyovers, the road is almost signal-free.
- Outer Ring Road is another major artery in New Delhi that links far-flung areas of Delhi
- The Delhi Noida Direct Flyway (DND Flyway) is an eight-laned access controlled tolled expressway which connects New Delhi and Delhi to Noida (an important satellite city of Uttar Pradesh). The acronym DND stands for "Delhi-Noida Direct".
- 'The Delhi Gurgaon Expressway is a 28 km (17 mi) expressway connecting New Delhi to Gurgaon, an important satellite city of Haryana.
- The Delhi Faridabad Skyway is controlled tolled expressway which connects New Delhi to Faridabad, an important satellite city of Haryana.

==== National Highways ====
New Delhi is connected by road to the rest of India through National highways:

- National Highway 19 (old number: NH 2), commonly referred to as Delhi-Kolkata Road is a busy Indian National Highway that runs through the states of Delhi, Haryana, Uttar Pradesh, Bihar, Jharkhand, and West Bengal.
- National Highway 44 is a National Highway that connects Srinagar with Kanyakumari and passes through Delhi.
- National Highway 48 is a National Highway that connects New Delhi with Chennai.
- National Highway 9 is a National Highway that connects Malout in Punjab to Pithoragarh in Uttarakhand and passes through Delhi.

=== Railway ===
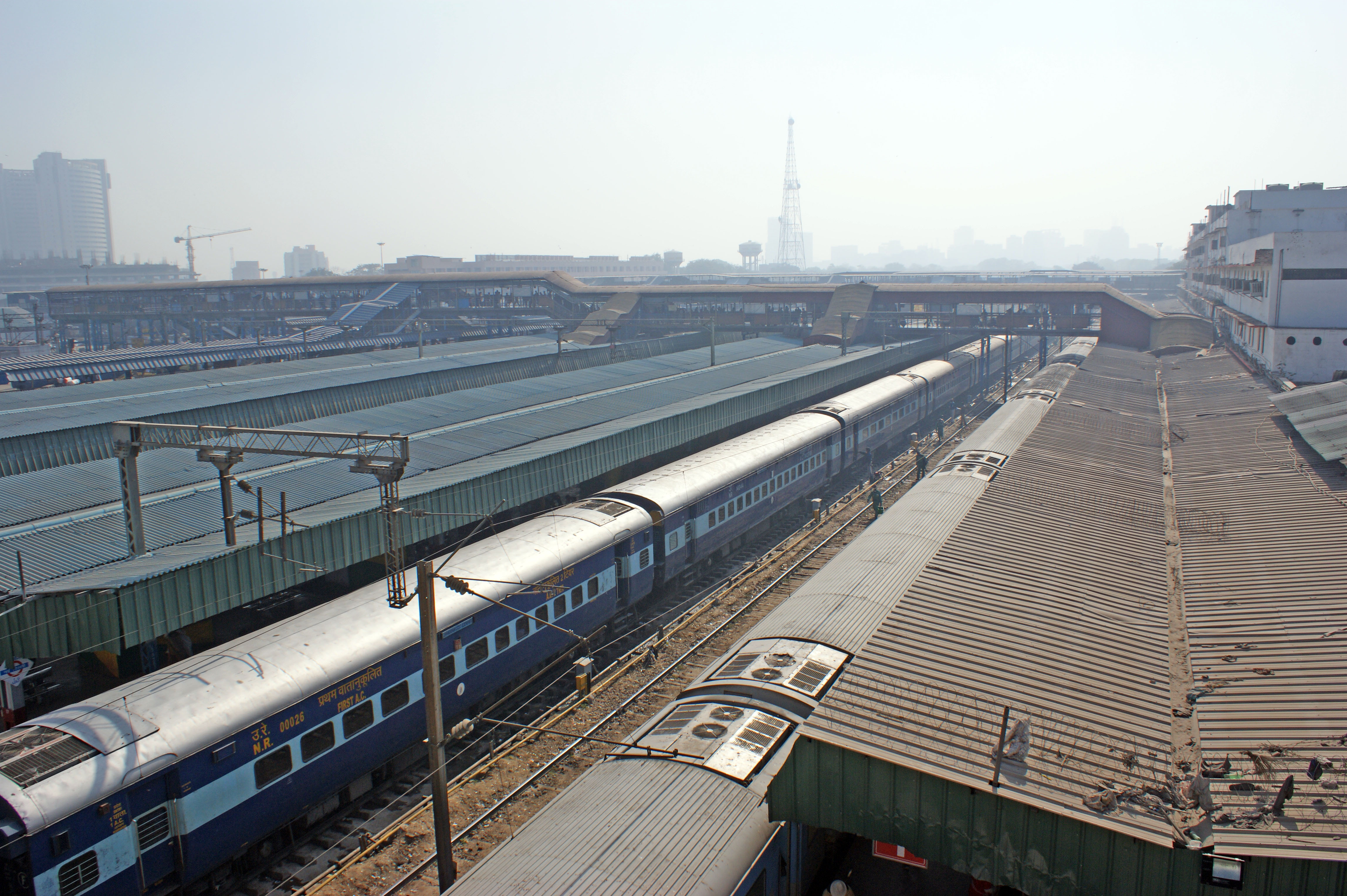
New Delhi railway station

| Station Name | Station Code | Railway Zone | Total Platforms |
|---|---|---|---|
| New Delhi | NDLS | Northern Railway | 16 |
| Delhi Junction | DLI | Northern Railway | 16 |
| Hazrat Nizamuddin | NZM | Northern Railway | 9 |
| Anand Vihar Terminal | ANVT | Northern Railway | 7 |
| Delhi Sarai Rohilla | DEE | Northern Railway | 7 |

New Delhi is a major junction in the Indian railway network and is the headquarters of the Northern Railway. The railway stations in New Delhi are New Delhi railway station, Hazrat Nizamuddin railway station. The Delhi Ring Railway, a 35-kilometre (22 mi) circular railway network in Delhi that runs parallel to the Ring Road, is a part of Delhi's suburban railway services.

Note: The Delhi Junction, Anand Vihar Terminal and Sarai Rohilla are not in New Delhi but in Delhi but are close to New Delhi.

=== Metro ===
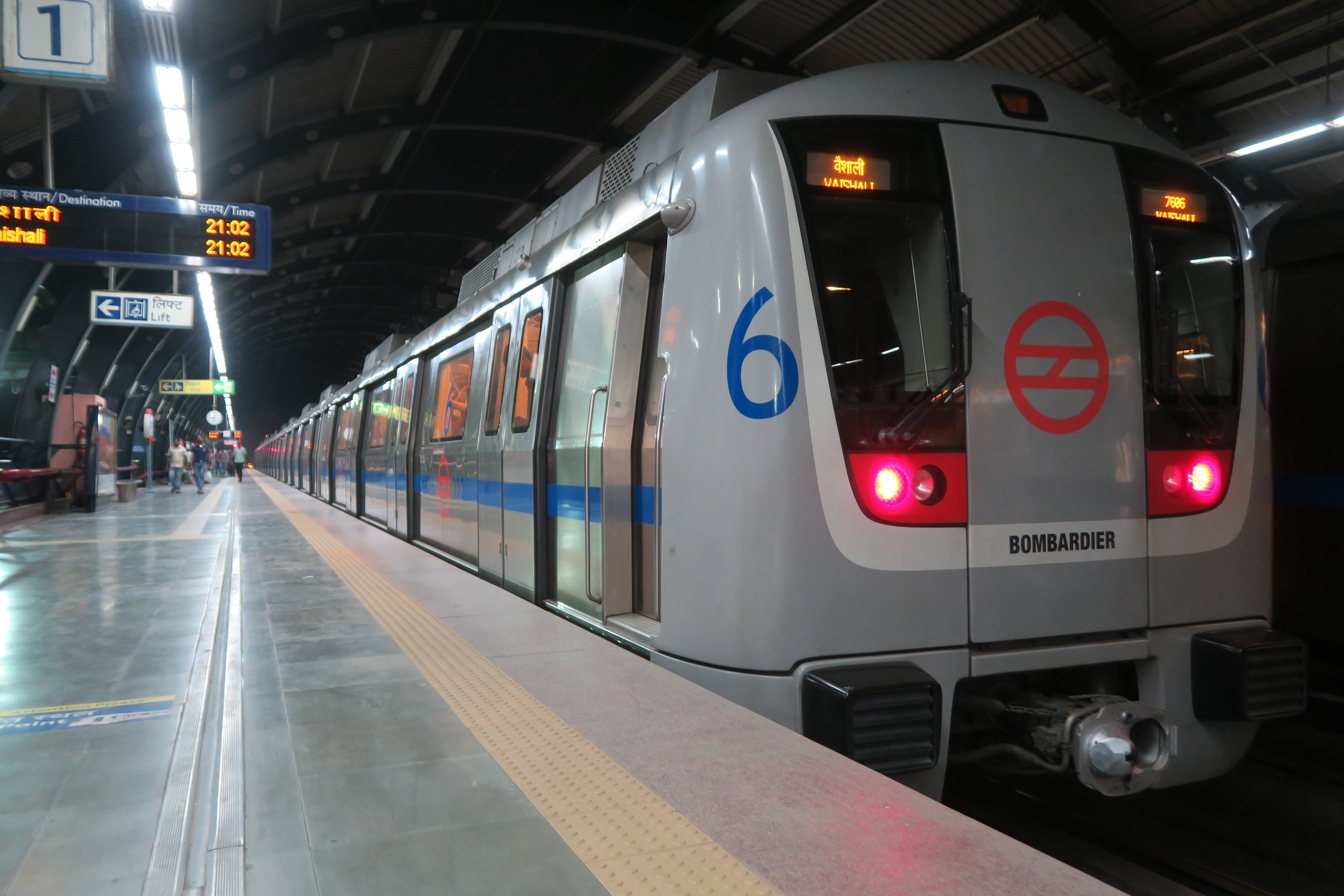
The Delhi Metro

The Delhi Metro is a rapid transit system serving Delhi, Faridabad, Ghaziabad, Gurgaon and Noida in the National Capital Region of India. Delhi Metro is the world's 12th largest metro system in terms of length. Delhi Metro was India's first modern public transportation system, which had revolutionised travel by providing a fast, reliable, safe, and comfortable means of transport. Presently, the network consists of 10 colour-coded lines serving 255 stations (Note: Transfer stations are counted more than once. There are 24 transfer stations. If transfer stations are counted only once, the result will be 230 stations. Ashok Park Main station, where the two diverging branches of Green Line share tracks/platforms, is anyway counted as a single station. Stations of Noida Metro and Gurgaon Metro are not counted. If stations of Noida Metro and Gurgaon Metro are counted, the result will be 286 stations) with a total length of 348.12 kilometres (216.31 mi). (Note: The total length of Delhi Metro is 348.12 kilometres (216.31 mi). The operations & maintenance of Gurgaon Metro and Noida Metro is currently undertaken by DMRC, so the total length operated by DMRC is 390.14 kilometres (242.42 mi).) The network has now crossed the boundaries of Delhi to reach Ghaziabad and Noida in Uttar Pradesh, and Faridabad and Gurgaon in Haryana. All stations have escalators, elevators, and tactile tiles to guide the visually impaired from station entrances to trains. It has a combination of elevated, at-grade, and underground lines, and uses both broad gauge and standard gauge rolling stock. Four types of rolling stock are used: Mitsubishi-ROTEM Broad gauge, Bombardier MOVIA, Mitsubishi-ROTEM Standard gauge, and CAF Beasain Standard gauge. According to a study, Delhi Metro has helped in removing about 390,000 vehicles from the streets of Delhi.

Delhi Metro is being built and operated by the Delhi Metro Rail Corporation Limited (DMRC), a state-owned company with equal equity participation from the Government of India and the Government of National Capital Territory of Delhi. However, the organisation is under administrative control of the Ministry of Urban Development, Government of India. Besides the construction and operation of the Delhi metro, DMRC is also involved in the planning and implementation of metro rail, monorail and high-speed rail projects in India and providing consultancy services to other metro projects in the country as well as abroad. The Delhi Metro project was spearheaded by E. Sreedharan, the managing director of DMRC and popularly known as the "Metro Man" of India. He famously resigned from DMRC, taking moral responsibility for a metro bridge collapse which took five lives. Sreedharan was awarded with the Legion of Honour by the French government for his contribution to Delhi Metro.

== Sports ==
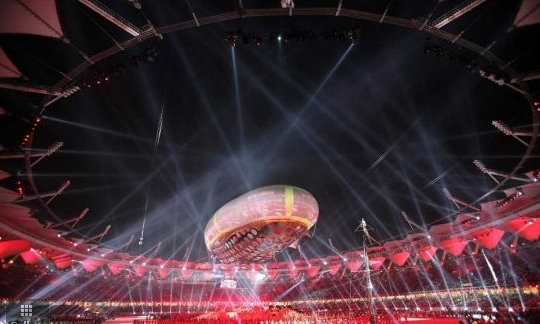
The 2010 Commonwealth Games opening ceremony at the Jawaharlal Nehru Stadium. In the foreground, there is an aerostat.

The city hosted the 2010 Commonwealth Games and annually hosts Delhi Half Marathon foot-race. The city has previously hosted the 1951 Asian Games and the 1982 Asian Games. New Delhi was interested in bidding for the 2019 Asian Games but was turned down by the government on 2 August 2010 amid allegations of corruption in 2010 Commonwealth Games. The city also had a bid to host the 1992 Summer Olympics, but withdrew in March 1986, seven months before the host selection.

Major sporting venues in New Delhi include the Jawaharlal Nehru Stadium, Ambedkar Stadium, Indira Gandhi Indoor Stadium, Arun Jaitley Stadium, R.K. Khanna Tennis Complex, Dhyan Chand National Stadium and Siri Fort Sports Complex.

| Club | Sport | League | Venue | Span |
|---|---|---|---|---|
| Delhi Capitals | Cricket | IPL | Arun Jaitley Stadium | 2008–present |
| Delhi Wizards | Field hockey | WSH | Dhyan Chand National Stadium | 2011–present |
| Delhi Waveriders | Field hockey | HIL | Dhyan Chand National Stadium | 2013–present |
| SC Delhi | Football | ISL | Jawaharlal Nehru Stadium, Ambedkar Stadium (tentative) | 2025–present |
| Delhi Dynamos FC | Football | ISL | Jawaharlal Nehru Stadium | 2014–2019 |
| Delhi FC | Football | I-League | Ambedkar Stadium | 1994–present |
| Delhi Dashers | Badminton | PBL | DDA Badminton and Squash Stadium | 2015–2019 |
| Dabang Delhi | Kabaddi | PKL | Thyagaraj Sports Complex | 2014–present |
| Indian Aces | Tennis | IPTL | Indira Gandhi Arena | 2014–present |
| Dilli Veer | Wrestling | PWL | K. D. Jadhav Wrestling Stadium | 2015–present |

== International relations and organisations ==
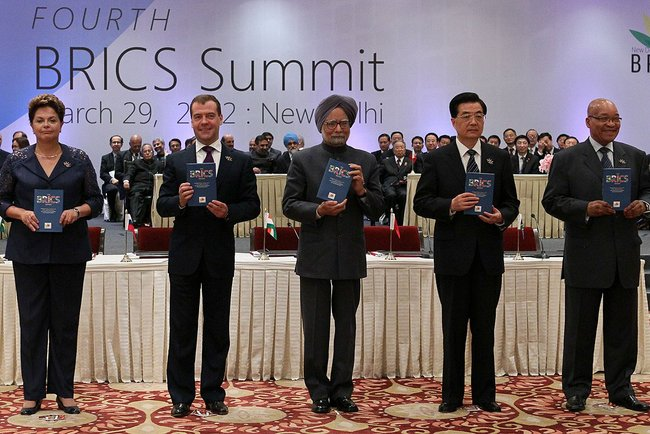
4th BRICS Summit in New Delhi in 2012

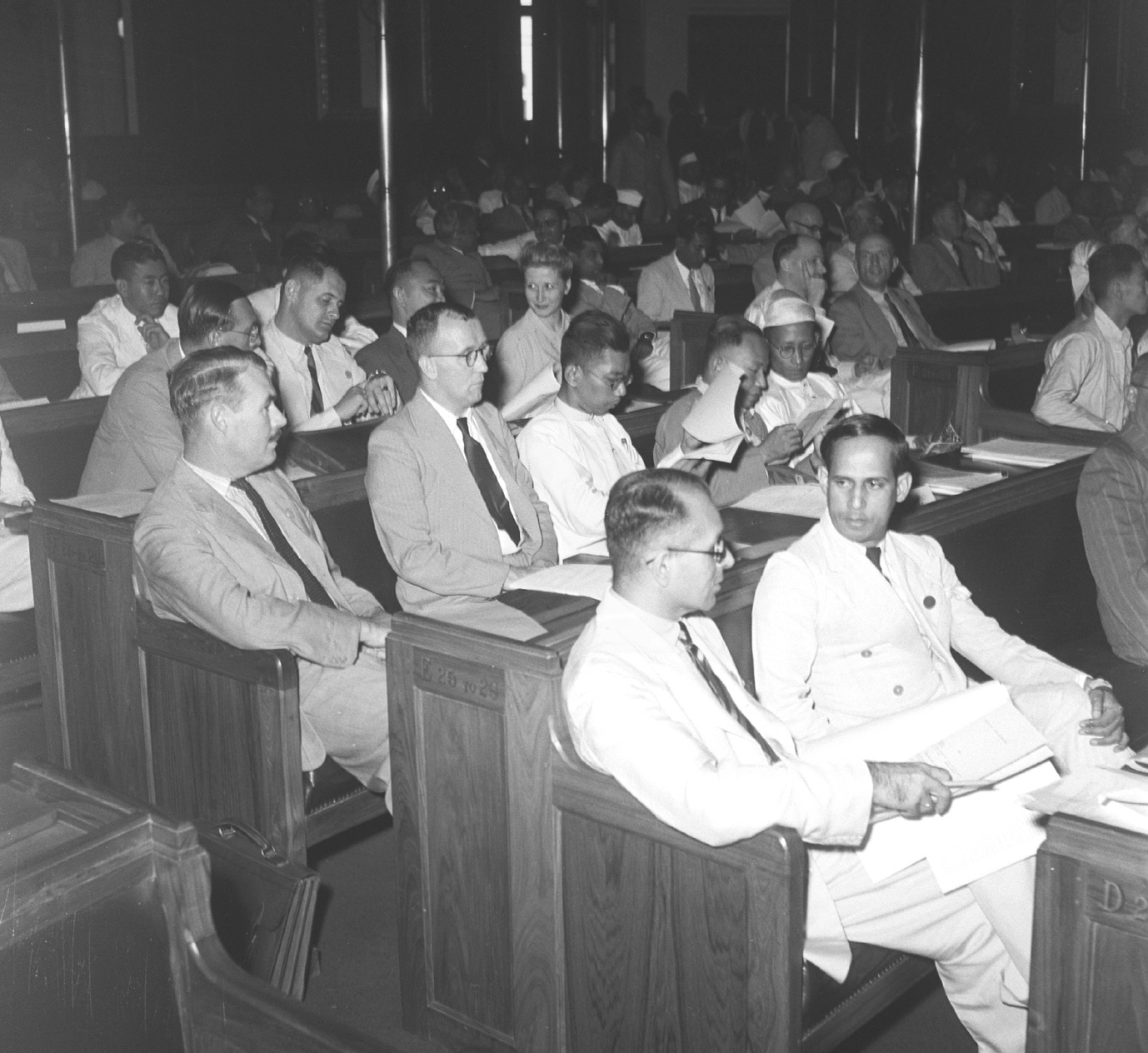
First plenary session of the Asian Regional Conference of the ILO in New Delhi, October 1947

The city is home to numerous international organisations. The Asian and Pacific Centre for Transfer of Technology of the UNESCAP servicing the Asia-Pacific region is headquartered in New Delhi. New Delhi is home to most UN regional offices in India namely the UNDP, UNODC, UNESCO, UNICEF, WFP, UNV, UNCTAD, FAO, UNFPA, WHO, World Bank, ILO, IMF, UNIFEM, IFC and UNAIDS. UNHCR Representation in India is also located in the city.

New Delhi hosts 145 foreign embassies and high commissions.

=== Summits, conferences and conventions ===
United Nations Conference on Trade and Development hosted its second meeting conference in the year 1968 at New Delhi.

New Delhi hosted the 7th NAM Summit in 1983, 4th BRICS Summit in 2012, IBSA Summit in 2015, and 5th Global Conference on CyberSpace in 2017. India has also host the G20 summit in 2023 in New Delhi.

=== Sister cities ===
- Moscow, Russia
- Beijing, China (2013)

== See also ==
- Delhi Tourism and Transportation Development Corporation
- Urban Health Resource Centre

== Bibliography ==
- Bardiar, Nilendra (2014). Urban, Cultural, Economic and Social Transformation: History of New Delhi 1947–65. New Delhi: Ruby Press & Co. ISBN 978-93-82395-49-2.
- Byron, Robert (1997). Architectural Review, New Delhi (2nd ed.). London: Asian Educational Services. pp. 36 pages. ISBN 978-8120612860.
- Byron, Robert (1931). New Delhi. The Architectural Review, Westminster.
- Johnson, David A. "A British Empire for the twentieth century: the inauguration of New Delhi, 1931", Urban History, Dec 2008, Vol. 35 Issue 3, pp. 462–487.
- Kapoor, Pramod; Malvika Singh; Rudrangshu Mukherjee (2009). New Delhi: Making of a Capital. Lustre Press. ISBN 978-81-7436-574-3.
- Kumar, Pushpam (February 2009). "Assessment of Economic Drivers of Land Use Change in Urban Ecosystems of Delhi, India". Ambio. 38 (1): 35–39. Bibcode:2009Ambio..38...35K. doi:10.1579/0044-7447-38.1.35. PMID 19260345. S2CID 45773128.
- Pothen, Nayantara (2012). Glittering Decades New Delhi in Love and War. Penguin. ISBN 978-0-670-08600-9. 288 pages.
- Ridley, Jane. "Edwin Lutyens, New Delhi, and the Architecture of Imperialism", Journal of Imperial & Commonwealth History, May 1998, Vol. 26 Issue 2, pp. 67–83.
- Sonne, Wolfgang (2003). Representing the State: Capital City Planning in the Early Twentieth Century. 367pp; compares New Delhi, Canberra, Washington & Berlin.
- Volwahsen, Andreas (2003). Imperial Delhi: The British Capital of the Indian Empire. Prestel Publishing. pp. 320 pages. ISBN 978-3-7913-2788-4.
