= International Mango Festival =

Festival

Over 500 types of mango are featured at the International Mango Festival

The International Mango Festival, held annually in Delhi, India during early summer, is a two-day festival showcasing mangoes. It has been held since 1987.

It is organised by the Delhi Tourism and Transportation Development Corporation (DTTDC) in collaboration with the Agricultural and Processed Food Products Export Development Authority, the National Horticultural Board and the New Delhi Municipal Council. As in recent past years, the festival was held in the Talkatora Indoor Stadium.

A tourism official explained:

More than 50 mango growers from across the country, mainly from Uttar Pradesh, Bihar, Gujarat and Delhi, were given an interactive platform to present the 'king of fruits' [...] The visitors, who normally think mango has just five or six varieties, were educated through quizzes and competitions about the huge variety of the fruit grown and innumerable possibilities of using mango in cuisine. They also enjoyed colourful entertainment programmes of music and dance. [...] It is an informal and international platform with a two-fold approach, to promote tourism as well as mango export.

More than 550 varieties and cultivars of mango are featured in the festival for visitors to view and taste. Among these are alphonso, mallika, amrapali, himsagar, malda, balia, chorasya, dhaman, dhoon, fazia, gelchia, nigarin kheria, ruchika and shamasi. Notable chefs from five star hotels like the Maurya Sheraton, Taj Mahal Palace & Tower, Inter-Continental Hotel, Marriott India, Qutub Hotel and Claridges around India demonstrate the preparation of assorted recipes made with mango.

The festival is also an opportunity for agro-industries and food industries processing mangoes into jams, pickles, fruit juice and canned fruit to display their products.

Activities in the festival include cultural programmes and recreational events like a mango eating competition for women, mango slogan writing, a demonstration of mango carving, a magic show, and a quiz about mangoes. For the mango judging competition, there are various categories and a minimum of seven ripe mangoes are required for competing in each. There is also a prize given for biggest mango.

In describing International Mango Festival, a reporter for the BBC said:

Some visitors found the culinary preparations - unusual in a country where the fruit is primarily eaten uncooked - interesting. India exports about 40,000 metric tonnes of mangoes to 80 countries and the annual revenue earned from exporting mangoes and mango products reaches $85 million. Festival organisers hope the event will help to raise these figures significantly. Hindu mythology in India gives the mango an aura of mystique as a symbol of the joy of life.

== Other festivals ==
Mango festivals are also held elsewhere in the world such as one hosted by Fairchild Tropical Gardens in Miami, Florida, United States, another in Cebu, Philippines and a third in Negril, Jamaica.
