= State Domestic Product =

State Domestic Product (SDP) is the total value of goods and services produced during any financial year within the geographical boundaries of a state. Also called the state income, SDP is always calculated or estimated in monetary terms, and is instrumental in the evaluation of per capita income. State here refers to a country subdivision, as in the states of the United States and the states of India. While GDP gives a good estimate of the entire nation's output, SDP provides more detailed economic details about subnational territories.

== See also ==
- Gross State Product
