= Brady West =

American statistician

Brady Thomas West
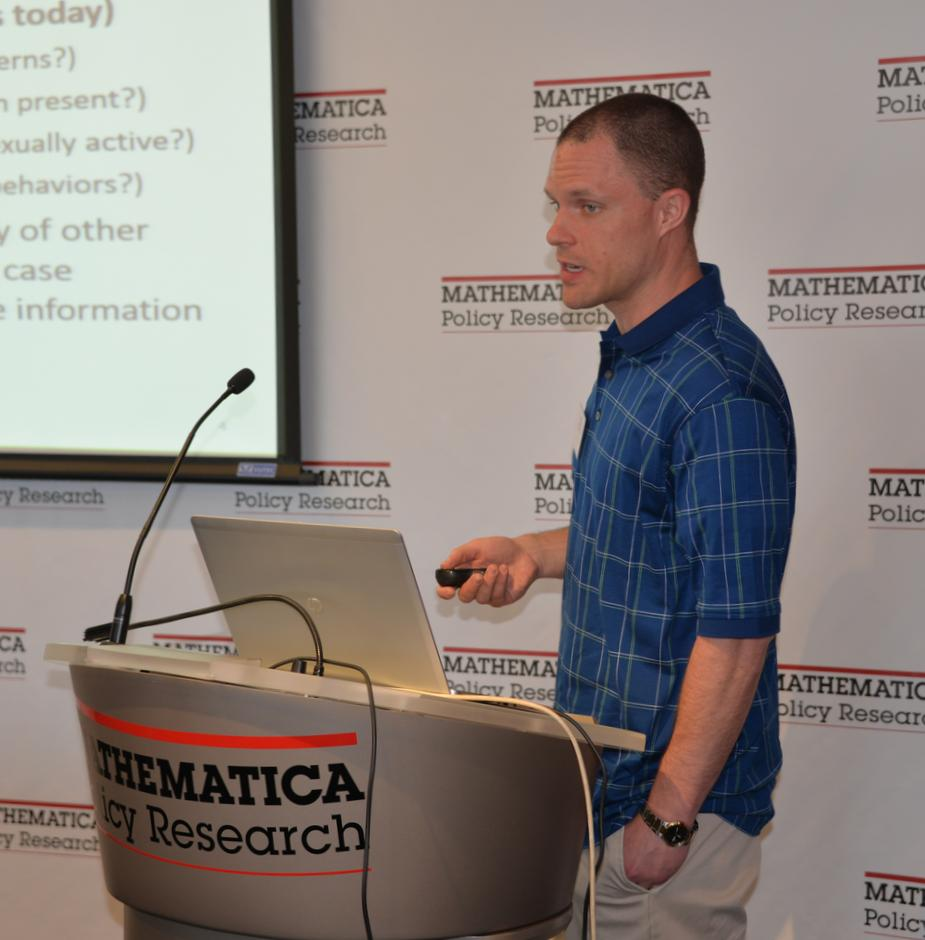
- Citizenship: United States
- Occupations: Statistician, academic and author

Academic background
- Education: B.S. in Statistics; M.A. in Applied Statistics; Ph.D. in Survey Methodology
- Alma mater: University of Michigan, Ann Arbor

Academic work
- Institutions: University of Michigan, Ann Arbor; University of Maryland, College Park; University of North Carolina at Chapel Hill

Brady Thomas West is an American statistician, academic and author. He is a research professor in the Survey Methodology Program (SMP) at the Survey Research Center (SRC) in the Institute for Social Research (ISR), and a research professor in the Department of Biostatistics within the School of Public Health, both at the University of Michigan, Ann Arbor. He also serves as an Adjunct Research Professor in the Joint Program in Survey Methodology (JPSM) at the University of Maryland, College Park and as an Adjunct Instructor at the Odum Institute for Research in Social Science at the University of North Carolina at Chapel Hill.

West is most known for his research on measurement error, survey estimation, selection bias, survey design, interviewer effects, and multilevel regression models. He is the lead author of a book titled Linear Mixed Models: A Practical Guide using Statistical Software, Third Edition, which compares different statistical software packages in terms of their mixed-effects modeling procedures, and is also the co-author of Applied Survey Data Analysis, among other books.

West was elected Fellow of the American Statistical Association in 2022. As of 2024, he serves as an associate editor of Journal of Survey Statistics and Methodology and Sociological Methods & Research and an editorial board member of Field Methods.

== Education and early career ==
West earned a B.S. in Statistics from the University of Michigan (UM), Ann Arbor, in 2001, followed by a M.A. in Applied Statistics from the same university in 2002. He worked as a Computer Systems Consultant II and Senior Statistician/Statistical Consultant in the Center for Statistical Consultation and Research at UM during 2003 to 2007. He was appointed as a Statistician Lead for Consulting for Statistics, Computing, and Analytics Research (CSCAR) at UM from 2007 until 2018. During this time, from 2008 to 2011, he worked as a Graduate Student Research Assistant at the SMP in the ISR. He also served as an Associate at Daves and Associates Research from 2010 to 2012 while earning a Ph.D. in Survey Methodology from UM in 2011.

== Career ==
From 2011 to 2016, West served as a research assistant professor at the University of Michigan and an adjunct research assistant professor at the University of Maryland-College Park, and held the position of research associate professor and adjunct research associate professor from 2016 to 2022, respectively. He has been a research professor in the Department of Biostatistics within the School of public health at the University of Michigan, Ann Arbor, since 2023, and a research professor in the SMP at the SRC in the ISR since 2022. He was named a collegiate research professor at the University of Michigan in 2026. He is currently an associate director of the Health and Retirement Study, and the founding director of CSCAR@ISR, which provides statistical consulting services to the University of Michigan campus in combination with the departments of statistics and biostatistics. Additionally, he has served as an adjunct instructor at the Odum Institute for Research in Social Science at the University of North Carolina-Chapel Hill since 2012, and as an adjunct research professor in the JPSM at the University of Maryland-College Park since 2022.

West has held numerous professional appointments throughout his career. In 2016, he was elected as associate chair of the education committee on the AAPOR executive council, assuming the role of chair for the subsequent term spanning 2017 to 2018, and as the council's associate chair of the conference committee in 2021, ultimately serving as chair of the 2023 AAPOR annual conference.

== Research ==
West's research has explored measurement error in auxiliary variables, survey paradata, selection bias, responsive survey design, interviewer effects, and multilevel regression models for clustered and longitudinal data. His work has been featured in media outlets such as The New York Times, The Wall Street Journal, and The Michigan Daily.

West's publications have contributed extensively to survey methodology and research. He is the lead author of the third edition of Linear Mixed Models, which focused on comparing mixed-effects modeling methods across different software. Carlos A. Coelho called its first edition "A very good starting point for those willing to get a more in-depth knowledge of LMMs", and Petra Macaskill applauded the authors "for undertaking—and to a large extent succeeding in—such an ambitious project." Toral Burghoff recommended the second edition book even to owners of the first edition, noting its coverage of various situations where LMMs are applied and its demonstration of commonly used software packages in different settings. Likewise, Andreas Ziegler, a book review editor of Biometrical Journal, praised the third edition, stating, "This book is perfect for readers seeking a quick reference for various situations where LMMs are applicable."

In 2010, West co-authored the book, Applied Survey Data Analysis, presenting a statistical overview of how to correctly apply modern techniques for design-based analysis of complex sample survey data. The book is in its second edition. Martin Crowder wrote that "…there is a wealth of instruction here. The writing style is expansive, keeping mathematics in check, and the material is well organized clearly into appropriate sections. I think that the book would serve any budding survey practitioner well."

West also served as a co-editor of the 2017 volume Total Survey Error in Practice, which offered insights into total survey error (TSE) and provided tools to enhance survey data quality amidst evolving large-scale datasets, emphasizing efficiency without sacrificing accuracy. In collaboration with Annelies G. Blom, he presented a research synthesis analyzing the impact of human interviewers on survey processes, using the TSE framework to assess historical trends, identify knowledge gaps, and shape future research on interviewer effects. Afterward, in 2019, he co-edited the book Experimental Methods in Survey Research that delved into the experimental designs within surveys, incorporating both probability and non-probability samples, while employing a TSE perspective to illuminate the strengths and limitations of these techniques across various disciplines. Katherine Jenny Thompson, in her review of this work, said, "As an overview of quantitative research applied to survey methodology, the book is a success. The variety of topics is comprehensive, and the literature overviews are generally very informative." Additionally, he co-edited Interviewer Effects from a Total Survey Error Perspective, published in 2020, examining interviewer roles, challenges, and solutions within survey data collection, with a focus on training, management, analysis, and data quality optimization through the TSE framework. A Public Opinion Quarterly review called this book "a timely contribution to the literature on survey interviewing," highlighting its holistic approach in studying interviewers, survey processes, and errors for a complete understanding."

=== Public health and medicine ===
West's applied research has examined substance use, mental health, and discrimination among diverse U.S. populations, revealing heightened risks for certain sexual orientation groups, increased odds of substance use disorders for LGBT adults experiencing discrimination, and complex relationships between sexual orientation, race/ethnicity, and gender with mental health disorders. He has also highlighted disparities in depression care utilization across ethnic and racial groups, and elevated substance use disorder risks among sexual minorities due to childhood victimization.

West has also made contributions to studies focusing on prescription drug use and abuse in the United States. In particular, his work has brought to light the importance of prevention efforts targeting children and adolescents, the crucial role of continued monitoring in guiding prevention and intervention efforts, the need for enhanced vigilance in prescribing and monitoring opioids among adolescents, and national trends in medical and nonmedical use of prescription opioids among US high school seniors.

Within the context of medical research, West's work has identified cholestasis and age-adjusted small bowel length as major predictors of mortality in pediatric short bowel syndrome, along with the presence of the ileocecal valve for successful weaning from parenteral nutrition. In related research, he was involved in a study that underscored improved survival rates with the ipilimumab-radiotherapy combination in melanoma brain metastases, highlighting the significance of multimodality therapy for achieving better outcomes.

== Personal life ==
West is married to Laura Elizabeth West, with whom he has two children: Carter and Everleigh. He lives in Dexter, Michigan. He is the son of Kenneth and Tommi West, of Livonia, Michigan, and has a brother, Daniel West, who is the director of crisis services for the Detroit Wayne Integrated Health Network in Detroit, Michigan.

== Bibliography ==
=== Books ===
- Applied Survey Data Analysis (2017) ISBN 978-1-351-64930-8
- Total Survey Error in Practice (2017) ISBN 978-1-119-04167-2
- Experimental Methods in Survey Research: Techniques that Combine Random Sampling with Random Assignment (2019) ISBN 978-1-119-08374-0
- Interviewer Effects from a Total Survey Error Perspective (2020) ISBN 978-0-367-89631-7
- Linear Mixed Models: A Practical Guide Using Statistical Software (2022) ISBN 978-1-003-18106-4

=== Selected articles ===
- West, B. T., & Blom, A. G. (2017). Explaining interviewer effects: A research synthesis. Journal of survey statistics and methodology, 5(2), 175–211.
- West, B. T., Little, R. J., Andridge, R. R., Boonstra, P. S., Ware, E. B., Pandit, A., & Alvarado-Leiton, F. (2021). Assessing selection bias in regression coefficients estimated from nonprobability samples with applications to genetics and demographic surveys. The annals of applied statistics, 15(3), 1556.
- Ren, W., Krenzke, T., West, B., & Cantor, D. (2022, April). An Evaluation of the quality of interviewer and virtual observations and their value for nonresponse bias reduction. In Survey Research Methods (Vol. 16, No. 1, pp. 97–131).
- Wagner, J., West, B. T., Couper, M. P., Zhang, S., Gatward, R., Nishimura, R., & Saw, H. W. (2023). An Experimental Evaluation of Two Approaches for Improving Response to Household Screening Efforts in National Mail/Web Surveys. Journal of survey statistics and methodology, 11(1), 124–140.
- West, B. T., Zhang, S., Wagner, J., Gatward, R., Saw, H. W., & Axinn, W. G. (2023). Methods for improving participation rates in national self-administered web/mail surveys: Evidence from the United States. Plos one, 18(8), e0289695.
