= CSPro =

Survey processing software

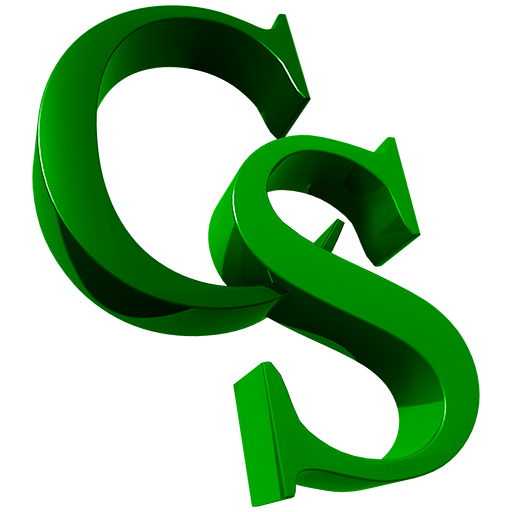
- Developer: U.S. Census Bureau
- Stable release: 8.1.4 / August 31, 2026
- Operating system: Microsoft Windows, Android
- Type: Application development, data processing, statistical software, CAPI
- License: Public domain Open Source
- Website: census.gov/data/software/cspro.html github.com/csprousers https://github.com/csprousers/cspro/releases

CSPro, short for the Census and Survey Processing System, is a public domain and Open source data collection and processing software package developed by the U.S. Census Bureau and ICF International. Serpro S.A. was involved in past development. Funding for development comes primarily from the U.S. Agency for International Development. The main purpose of this software suite is to design applications for data collection, processing and tabulation.

CSPro was designed and implemented through a joint effort by the developers of two earlier software packages that were used to capture, edit, and tabulate census and survey data on DOS-based machines: the Integrated Microcomputer Processing System (IMPS), developed by the U.S. Census Bureau, and the Integrated System for Survey Analysis (ISSA), developed by Serpro S.A. As a result, CSPro is founded on more than 35 years of development.

The software can be run on Windows-based OS (8,10 and 11—Linux and IOS operating systems are not supported) to design applications able to be deployed on Android and Windows family OS following its "Build Once, Deploy Many" ability. These applications can be used for mobile survey data collection (via Smartphones or tablets), or for office-based collection (via laptops or desktops). The public domain distribution is open source. Support for Unicode data entry began with version 5.

A CSPro application can be used as a questionnaire for entering, editing, tabulating, mapping, and disseminating census and survey data. The CSPro Designer integrated development environment (IDE) can also be used to develop information systems in fields such as monitoring and evaluation, business administration, and logistics.

This package is widely used worldwide by statistical agencies, international organizations, NGOs, consulting firms, colleges and universities, hospitals, and private sector groups, in more than 160 countries. Major international household survey programs, such as Multiple Indicator Cluster Surveys (MICS) and Demographic and Health Surveys (DHS) also use CSPro for Census and Survey work.

While the program uses a simple graphical interface (IDE), but with recent features, CSPro support UI that can be infinitely enhanced with advanced web technologies (HTML5, CSS, JSON, JS). Latest CSPro versions also support sophisticated programming languages such as CSPro logic, SQL and Javascript (any QuickJS-NG compatible ESM libraries) that can be used to create highly customized applications. Beginning users can program simple quality control checks, and advanced users can write dynamic applications using multi paradigms programming languages that it support.

It remains actively in development (as of Spring 2026). With latest improvements, CSPro designed application support:

- SQLite and SQL language;
- Relational database support on device and servers;
- Improved data security through transparent data encryption and support of best in class hashing/salting algorithms;
- Multiple questions per screen;
- Mobile Mapping: Displaying dynamic mapping and deal with geographic informations (online maps, Tiled offline basemap and points (all features: polygon, polyline, line is supported on version 7.7));
- Introduction of Objects programming in CSPro logic;
- CSS, HTML5, JavaScript via QuickJS-NG, QSF text, Webview/Webview 2 and CSPro-JavaScript interface;
- PHP through CSWeb;
- Powerful and comprehensive paradata for complete and intelligent monitoring of the data collection step;
- Smart application installation using barcode/QR Code;
- Advanced Rest-API for data manipulation using the Network action invoker: https://csprousers.org/help/CSPro/CS_Network.html and the CSWeb V2 API: https://github.com/csprousers/csweb/blob/dev/src/CSPro/swagger.json
- Multiple programming language improvements (smart synchronization (including on local Dropbox and FTP servers, dynamic translation, etc.));
- Native cloud support: A CSPro apps can sync data to unlimited servers or data source;
- Community experimental CAWI support (CSEntry Android on the web via KMP) https://github.com/gregvolny/CSEntryWeb_KMP

The source code of the CSPro software Suite: CSPro Designer, CSEntry Windows and Android, CSPro Help Documentation, CSWeb API have been released to the public. And starting 2025, CSPro become an open source project. In addition to the help system disseminated with CSPro, an active users forum is maintained as well.

== See also ==
- Epi Info
- X-12-ARIMA
- Data Processing
- Data collection system
- CAPI
- Survey data collection
- Information System
