= Leyla Mohadjer =

American statistician

Leyla Kheradmand Mohadjer is an American statistician who works as a vice president, senior statistical fellow, and associate director of the statistical staff at Westat. She is an expert in survey methodology, total survey error, quality control, and participation bias, and has led the statistical efforts of the Programme for the International Assessment of Adult Competencies and the Programme for International Student Assessment (both of the OECD), and the National Health and Nutrition Examination Survey of the National Center for Health Statistics.

Mohadjer earned a master's degree and, in 1985, a doctorate in statistics from George Washington University. Her dissertation was The efficiency of the normal discriminant analysis compared to the logistic regression for the prediction criterion.

She was elected as a Fellow of the American Statistical Association in 2007. She is also an Elected Member of the International Statistical Institute.
