= Morgan Earp (statistician) =

American statistician

Morgan Sue Earp is an American statistician who works for the US government as acting director of the Division of Research and Methodology of the National Center for Health Statistics. Topics of her research include observational error, participation bias, psychometrics, and total survey error.

== Education and career ==
Earp earned a Ph.D. from the University of Denver in 2007. Her dissertation, Development and Validation of the Statistics Anxiety Measure, was supervised by Kathy E. Green.

She began working for the US government in 2006, as a statistician in the National Agricultural Statistics Service. She moved to the Bureau of Labor Statistics in 2011, and again to the National Center for Health Statistics in 2020. She was president of the Washington, D.C. section of the American Association for Public Opinion Research in 2015, and chaired the Survey Research Methods Section of the American Statistical Association in 2020.

== Recognition ==
Earp was named as a 2024 Fellow of the American Statistical Association.
