= European Social Survey =

The European Social Survey (ESS) is a social scientific endeavour to map the attitudes, beliefs and behaviour patterns of the various populations in Europe. The average duration of an ESS interview is 60 minutes in British English and data is deposited in the ESS Data Portal https://ess.sikt.no/en/.

Professor Rory Fitzgerald is the Director of the ESS which in 2013 became a European Research Infrastructure Consortium (ERIC). The headquarters are at City, University of London.

When it comes to social surveys, the ESS is viewed as a standard, thanks to the high quality of the data it collects. It is highly valued by academics.

== History ==
The ESS was initiated by the European Science Foundation under the leadership of Sir Roger Jowell and Max Kaase 1995 and established in 2001 at the National Centre for Social Research (now NatCen Social Research) in London.

One of the reasons to start this new time series of social scientific data was that existing cross-national attitude surveys were regarded as not of sufficient methodological rigour to draw on as reliable sources for knowledge about changes over time in Europe. Since 2002-2003, a total of 40 countries have participated in at least one round of data collection. In the most recent 2020-2022 ESS Round 10, 32 countries are participating.

In 2013, the ESS became an independent legal entity known as an ERIC and as of 2020 has 25 Member countries and one Observer country. In 2016, the ESS became a landmark of the ESFRI roadmap in recognition of its consolidation.

As of October 2024, there are over 230,000 registered users of the ESS from countries across the world and almost 7,000 publications used the ESS data.

== Scope ==
=== Themes ===
The ESS is composed of a core section, with themes that appear in every round, and a rotating section dedicated to specific themes in specific rounds. The core section includes the following themes:

- Media use and trust
- Politics
- Well-being, exclusion, religion, discrimination, identity
- Personal and household characteristics
- Socio-demographics
- Human values

The following table includes the themes of the rotating section, including which rounds they appear in.

Theme	Round 1	Round 2	Round 3	Round 4	Round 5	Round 6	Round 7	Round 8	Round 9	Round 10	Round 11
Family, work and wellbeing		x		x	x					x	
Personal and social wellbeing			x			x					
Immigration	x						x	x			
Citizen involvement	x										
Health and care		x									
Economic morality		x									
Timing of life			x						x		
Welfare attitudes				x				x			
Ageism				x							
Justice					x						
Democracy						x				x	
Social inequalities in health							x				x
Climate change								x		x	x
Justice and fairness									x		
Digital social contacts										x	
COVID-19										x	
Gender											x

=== Participating countries ===
Since 2002-2003, 39 countries have participated in at least one round, with 31 countries having participated in ESS Round 10 (2020-22). Countries that have never participated or have not participated in a while members are welcome to join the next round. The participating countries are included in the following table.

	Round 1 2002/03	Round 2 2004/05	Round 3 2006/07	Round 4 2008/09	Round 5 2010/11	Round 6 2012/13	Round 7 2014/15	Round 8 2016/17	Round 9 2018/19	Round 10 2020/22	Round 11 2023/24
Albania						x			x		
Austria	x	x	x	x	x		x	x	x	x	x
Belgium	x	x	x	x	x	x	x	x	x	x	x
Bulgaria			x	x	x	x			x	x	x
Croatia				x	x				x	x	x
Cyprus			x	x	x	x			x	x	x
Czech Republic	x	x		x	x	x	x	x	x	x	(x)
Denmark	x	x	x	x	x	x	x		x		
Estonia		x	x	x	x	x	x	x	x	x	x
Finland	x	x	x	x	x	x	x	x	x	x	x
France	x	x	x	x	x	x	x	x	x	x	x
Germany	x	x	x	x	x	x	x	x	x	x	x
Greece	x	x		x	x					x	x
Hungary	x	x	x	x	x	x	x	x	x	x	x
Iceland		x				x		x	x	x	x
Ireland	x	x	x	x	x	x	x	x	x	x	x
Israel	x			x	x	x	x	x		x	x
Italy	x	x				x		x	x	x	x
Kosovo						x					
Latvia			x	x			x		x	x	x
Lithuania				x	x	x	x	x	x	x	x
Luxembourg	x	x									
Montenegro									x	x	x
Netherlands	x	x	x	x	x	x	x	x	x	x	x
North Macedonia										x	
Norway	x	x	x	x	x	x	x	x	x	x	x
Poland	x	x	x	x	x	x	x	x	x	x	x
Portugal	x	x	x	x	x	x	x	x	x	x	x
Romania			x	x					x		
Russian Federation			x	x	x	x		x			
Serbia									x	x	x
Slovakia		x	x	x	x	x			x	x	x
Slovenia	x	x	x	x	x	x	x	x	x	x	x
Spain	x	x	x	x	x	x	x		x	x	x
Sweden	x	x	x	x	x	x	x	x	x	x	x
Switzerland	x	x	x	x	x	x	x	x	x	x	x
Turkey		x		x							
Ukraine		x	x	x	x	x					x
United Kingdom	x	x	x	x	x	x	x	x	x	x	x

== Methodology ==
=== Sampling ===
The ESS is flexible in terms of the choice of sample design, as each country has different sampling resources. However, some requirements should absolutely be respected, and these are mentioned in the Survey Specification of the ESS.

Firstly, the sampling method should cover the ESS target population as best as possible. This includes all people over the age of 15 who live in a private household. Their nationality or language does not matter.

Secondly, probability sampling should be used at every stage to select individuals. Neither quota sampling nor substitution of non-responding or non-accessible units is permitted.

Thirdly, the design chosen should provide a prescribed level of statistical precision. Therefore, the minimum affective sample size should be of 800 for countries with a population inferior to 2 million inhabitants who are over 15, and of at least 1,500 for other countries.

=== Data collection ===
In May 2022, the ESS General Assembly switched to a self-completion design after a recommendation by the Core Scientific Team (CST), rather than conducting face-to-face interviews. This transition is due to a decreased capacity of face-to-face interviewers as well as diminished quality, all while conserving the accuracy of the data.

Before the data collection, the CST provides a quality report to every country on issues that should be taken into account in the next round. CST members and Field directors meet to discuss standards of data collection. Four weeks before fieldwork starts, the fieldwork questionnaire should be filled in by National Coordinators (NCs), and agreed by the CST. Two weeks before the start of fieldwork, fieldwork projections based on previous rounds should be provided by each countries.

During data collection, every country should submit weekly fieldwork progress in the form of a dataset to the CST, which is compared to the previously submitted fieldwork projections. This is useful in identifying plausible issues, which survey organizations might need to investigate.

After data collection, the countries should deposit all fieldwork documents as well as the ESS data set at the ESS Data Archive. They should also provide metadata in the form of the National Technical Summary, and paradata in the form of contact form data. The CST then analyzes all quality aspects, including interviewer effects, sample composition, refusal conversion, and so on.

=== Data processing and archiving ===
From the stage when files are deposited to the ESS Archive Intranet until the final approval of the files, 16 data programmes are applied. Each programme is a specific step of the data processing stage, and there are two main ones we can identify. Those two stages are both followed by data processing reports to the NCs.

The first stage is data ingest and data checks, which uses programme 1 to 5. This stage is aimed at improving data quality and standardization as much as possible. Data ingest is about checking formal attributes of the data files, and data checks looks for wild codes and inconsistencies in the data.

The second stage is about editing data, edit controls and approving the final data. It uses programmes 6 to 11. This is about fixing the issues identified in the first stage, meaning recoding the wild codes and assigning missing values when necessary. Once the draft file is approved by the NCs, it can be integrated in the cross-national files.

The Norwegian Social Science Data Services (NSD) is the official data archive for the ESS since 2002. All data is archived in a safe manner, with three different strategies of preservation:

- Non-digital backups
- Emulation, where the original computing environment is recreated on modern systems.
- Migration, where digital objects are converted into newer and accessible formats.

== Prizes ==
In 2005 the ESS was the winner of the Descartes Prize, an annual European science award.

In 2020, the ESS was awarded the 2020 Lijphart/Przeworski/Verba (LPV) Dataset Award 2020 by the Comparative Politics Section of the American Political Science Association (APSA).

In 2024, the Kohli Foundation Infrastructure Prize for Sociology was awarded to the ESS.

== Bibliography ==
- Jowell, Roger; Roberts, Caroline; Fitzgerald, Rory; Eva, Gillian, eds. (2007-04-02). Measuring Attitudes Cross-Nationally: Lessons from the European Social Survey. Los Angeles: Sage Publishing. ISBN 978-1-4129-1981-4.

== See also ==
- Survey Research Methods by European Survey Research Association
- General Social Survey
- International Social Survey Programme
