= Urban Health Resource Centre =

Non-government organization in India

- Abbreviation: UHRC
- Website: www.uhrc.in

The Urban Health Resource Centre (UHRC) is a non-government organization in India that works towards improving the health, nutrition, well-being and social organization among poor urban communities. Established in 2005 in New Delhi, UHRC works in Indore, Agra and Delhi.

UHRCO works through demand-supply improvement, community-provider linkages, and demonstration programs The UHRC's demonstration programs utilize community organizing to establish women's community groups consisting of slum-dwelling women who advocate for community-level infrastructure improvements.

== History ==
UHRC was established in 2005 as a registered non-profit company under India's Companies Act, 1956 Its startup was supported by USAID between 2004 and 2005, but as of 2009, the UHRC no longer receives USAID financial support.

== Demonstration projects ==
UHRC implements demonstration programs among slum-dwelling populations with the intention that they be adapted, replicated and up-scaled by other government and non-government agencies. These demonstration programs focus simultaneously on community empowerment to enhance demand for services and on working with the service providers to improve supply side responsiveness to meet the increased demand. Since slum-dwellers are usually not connected to the mainstream population, part of the UHRC's ground work involves proactive community mobilization, encouragement and outreach to identify vulnerable populations and facilitate their connection to social and economic sector service providers such as healthcare, living environment services, house improvement services and employment programs.

== Community groups ==
UHRC programs facilitate the formation of women's and children's groups to strengthen the social cohesion in slums and to address gender inequity. The program works toward building their capacity to take charge of processes that affect family economics, health, education, nutrition, housing improvement and overall social wellbeing.

UHRC provides targeted trainings and workshops to community groups on topics such as (a) acquiring knowledge, (b) building negotiations skills and, (c) interfacing with diverse government agencies to improve slum living environments and access to health, nutrition and social entitlements. Slum communities in UHRC program cities participate in health education and promotion sessions facilitated by UHRC field workers on topics such as maternal and child health, nutrition, hygiene, and environmental health.

As the number of community groups in a local region reaches a critical mass, they are networked into a larger congress called a "federation" or cluster-team of women's groups, consisting of democratically agreed-upon representatives from each group. Cluster-level congresses of women's groups and slum-level groups receive regular supervision, mentoring support and materials (such as steel containers to store registers, charts, behaviour promotion materials, floor mats to sit during meetings) from UHRC teams to carry out meetings and activities working towards improved health and well-being.

UHRC partners with participating community groups and federations to help them access available services, schemes and resources. Groups and cluster-team members are also coached on negotiation skills and provided trainings on how to effectively negotiate with healthcare providers and other civic authorities through dialogue and formal applications to obtain health services and environmental services such as road paving, drain installation, sanitation/water infrastructure, garbage removal, and other entitlements.

Along with running the demonstration programs, UHRC also provides technical support to the government (at national, provincial, and city levels) and non-government agencies in the form of research, advocacy, and knowledge dissemination. Additionally, the UHRC central and field offices provides trainings, internships, and volunteer options for students from different universities in India and abroad. All interns and volunteers, who in the past eight years have included Masters and PhD students, have learnt from field based participatory action research in UHRC's program sites.

== UHRC programs ==
=== Health outreach, service access, and behavior promotion ===
Through workshops and training sessions, women's groups are encouraged to begin promoting healthy practices and health seeking behaviors in their communities, such as going to the hospital when a woman goes into labor. This process involves training women's group members to become social health activists so they can conduct preventive and promotive health workshops and sessions for their peers. An aspect of this training is encouraging women's group members to promote cultural and religious traditions that are relevant to their communities, while incorporating educational curriculums surrounding proper hygiene and healthy behaviors for new mothers. One example is that UHRC women's groups often hold group Annaprashan ceremonies (a ceremony wherein a child is first fed food other than milk), incorporating curriculums surrounding ante-natal child care.

UHRC also trains group members on reaching out to private and public healthcare providers such as Auxiliary Nurse Midwives (ANMs) and Anganwadi centers to run health camps in their communities. At the 13th World Congress on Public Health, the UHRC reported improvements in slum residents' access to health services and information and adoption of healthy behaviors in intervention areas. Furthermore, they noted that as of 2009, 70% of children in intervention areas were completely immunized as opposed to 28% in areas that had not yet developed UHRC programs.

In addition to advocacy and education, UHRC women's groups also play a direct role in linking women in urban slums to health services. Women's group members frequently escort married adolescent migrant girls to hospitals for safer deliveries when they go into labor, and to ante-natal services which they may not otherwise be familiar with.

=== Collective savings/social resilience funds ===
Once groups have developed a regular meeting schedule and have undertaken some basic health outreach activities, the UHRC proposes to groups that they could form a collective savings fund.

These collective savings funds are essentially a method of risk pooling. Groups decide upon a certain monthly or weekly contribution that each member needs to make to grow their fund. All contributions to the pool are recorded by a treasurer who is elected by the group. The women are facilitated to establish standards for mutual accountability. The UHRC aids in establishing a record keeping system and in training the women to keep these records up to date – trainings cover how to track and record collective savings, loans given from the savings pool, interest received along with the principal amount, and essential elements of managing savings and loans.

When a member or even a non-member family is in need of a loan, women's groups can provide low to zero interest loans (for example one group in Agra, Saraswati Mahila Swasth Samiti, has adopted a 2% interest rate). Collecting payments, managing the fund, and administering all loans is facilitated by women's group members with support from UHRC's team members. These funds play a crucial role in reducing the burden of health care costs on poor families, particularly during health emergencies. Loans are given for a variety of needs: a) Maternal and Child Health, b) Health emergencies, c) Prevention of school drop-outs, d) House improvements, e) Food insecurity, f) Expansion of small enterprises, g) Repaying debts from money-lender, and h) Social and family expenditures.

=== Petition writing and infrastructure improvement ===
As groups bring municipal problems forward, the UHRC will suggest that communities begin writing applications and letters to service providers, and holds trainings and workshops where group members can practice writing applications and learn about the importance of making and filing copies of all applications and letters that submitted. Field workers encourage groups to write highly specific, concrete requests that focus on a single issue rather than multiple issues to increase chances of success. They are also encouraged to have all members sign each request or petition to show consensus.

Usually the first few petitions or letters written are followed by a period of struggle or stagnancy. Municipal service providers and government officials tend to be initially unresponsive and uncooperative. Group members are therefore trained to write reminders following up on requests and to seek formal receipts from civic authorities for any communications sent. For example, group members are trained to send reminders through the government postal system, which automatically provides receipts to senders.

Women's groups also learn to recruit the support of democratically elected ward representatives who can help in interfacing with municipal corporations. Field workers guide group members to start by pursuing simple tasks, such as getting a street drain cleaned, before moving on to more ambitious projects such as road paving and water supply installation.

=== Social awareness and advocacy ===
UHRC women's groups have also begun organizing rallies around community needs, such as ousting alcohol vendors to disincentivize alcoholism, demonstrating against gambling to protect household finances, advocating against domestic violence, or organizing public health advocacy campaigns. Groups have also orchestrated sit ins at government offices to urge them to be responsive to community needs and requests by providing services, such as slum street paving, drain installation, water supply and sewage system installation, health and nutrition services, food security services, widows pensions.

=== Government scheme awareness and application support ===
Through engagement with its target populations in Indore, Agra, and Delhi, the UHRC began focusing its efforts on helping slum residents attain proper identification documentation. Slum residents, and particularly migrant adolescents living within urban slums, who do not have proper documentation face barriers such as ineligibility for government welfare programs and education scholarships as well as housing insecurity. The UHRC assists women's group members to learn about and apply for various forms of picture ID, voter ID, proof-of-address, and other documentation.

== Research and Knowledge Sharing ==
One area of research for the UHRC has been aimed at catalyzing local urban governments to recognize yet unlisted slums. Censuses often exclude the homeless and informal urban settlements as such settlements are often built on land that is not legally owned by the residents. An analysis of five Indian cities conducted by the UHRC through field work and review of local records kept by UHRC community groups showed that 40% of slums were unlisted and thus not recognized by local governments. Further analysis revealed that unlisted slum residents made up about 36% of all slum residents in these cities. "Slum enumeration" techniques used by the UHRC rely on slum community members to draw upon their knowledge of their communities and to reach out to other households in their slum to collect information for the enumeration. Such activities and relationship building allow UHRC community groups to document additional information such as income flows, and make decisions about which slum-improvement initiatives to prioritize.

Datasets and analyses of existing data generated by the UHRC have been used by UN organizations including the WHO and UN-Habitat. The UHRC's disaggregation and analysis of Demographic and Health Surveys (DHS) was highlighted in the WHO's "Hidden Cities" report.

Using India's National Family Health Survey (NFHS) dataset (an adaptation of DHS), the UHRC conducted an analysis of the poorest quartile of urban residents as compared to the rest of the urban population in Indian cities.

David Satterthwaite in his Editorial in Environment and Urbanization 2011 highlights the significance of UHRC's research. He states that UHRC's research provides

"evidence of the lack of attention to the health of the urban poor. For instance, in 2004–2005, the under-five mortality rate of the poorest urban quartile in many states in India was two to three times that of the rest of the urban population. The evidence also points to considerable differences between states in this regard. The poorest urban quartile in Uttar Pradesh, for instance, had an under-five mortality rate more than double that of the poorest urban quartile in Maharashtra. The analysis revealed that the under-five mortality rate among the poorest quartile of urban residents in many provinces in India was nearly three times higher than for the rest of the urban population. Inter-provincial disparities also exist with Uttar Pradesh's under-five mortality more than twice as high as that of Maharashtra. The analysis also showed that among the poorest quartile: 60% of children had not completed immunization regiments and around 50% suffered from undernutrition, about half of all births were not assisted by health workers, less than 20% had a direct water supply, and more than half did not use a flush or pit toilet to dispose of waste.Sattherthwaite also stresses that UHRC's research exposes the "scale of health disadvantages experienced by the poorest quartile of India's urban population and the large disparities in provision of health care, water and sanitation and in housing conditions in the urban population of seven states, between the poorest quartile and the rest of the population."

This work has been referenced in numerous publications including UNICEF's State of the World's Children 2012 report.

The UHRC also has a history of collaboration with Johns Hopkins Bloomberg School of Public Health to generate research on maternal and newborn health in slums and to assess the efficacy/implementation of existing interventions. One such collaboration revealed that factors affecting mothers' compliance with birth preparedness and complication readiness (BPACR) include maternal literacy and the use of antenatal services. .

Another collaboration demonstrated the significance of the "human touch method" (HT) to detect hypothermia in neonates in Indian slum dwellings. The HT method was compared to axillary digital thermometry (ADT) and the results showed that while HT had moderate diagnostic accuracy when compared with ADT, it was simpler and more programmatically feasible as an early assessment of newborn sickness, freeing up field workers to focus on counseling mothers rather than managing technology.

A third collaboration research with Bloomberg and King George Medical University, India surveyed women who gave birth in the three years preceding the survey. Results showed that 60% of pregnancies were registered with a health facility, and of these, only one quarter were registered with a government facility. Early registration facilitates early and frequent checkups during pregnancy and immediately after pregnancy and allows timely screening for complications. The survey showed that the low rate of government registrations was likely a result of poor-functioning public facilities, short-staffing of female doctors, poor referral systems, long queues, and impolite treatment towards slum women.

== Policy advocacy & technical support to government/NGOs ==
In 2004, prior to its renaming from USAID-EHP to the Urban Health Resource Centre, the Ministry of Health and Family Welfare designated UHRC as "the nodal technical agency for 'Urban Health Programme'". In this capacity, the UHRC's role has been to "provide further assistance to State Governments in formulating urban health proposals and to provide concrete examples for planning of health care delivery to the urban poor in different categories of cities".

This technical assistance included recommendations for goals and objectives of the Urban Health Program, coverage criteria, and a workflow for the development of urban health proposals by cities eligible for support from the Ministry of Health The UHRC also played a key role in shaping the National Urban Health Mission (NUHM), a sub-mission to the National Rural Health Mission (NRHM) launched in 2013, intended to consolidate, focus, and expand the Government of India's initiatives for addressing the needs of the urban poor which were formerly operated under the NRHM. Since its renaming to the UHRC, the organization has continued in its capacity of providing technical assistance to State Governments within India as they propose and execute urban health projects.

An example of the UHRC's role in supporting state governments is its role in helping the Uttrakhand Health & Family Welfare Society to develop its Program Implementation Plan (PIP) under the National Rural Health Mission. Under the PIP, the UHRC's New Delhi location was selected to run Urban Health Centres (UHCs) aimed at providing health care and support in slum communities and regularized outreach camps to vulnerable urban populations. The UHRC's functions include coordinating NGO functionaries and collaborators and providing training to their staffs to help run UHCs, conducting GIS mapping of cities and slums to determine the most effective locations to place UHCs, and developing and piloting guidelines for women's group programs through its experience in its other program cities such as Indore and Agra. Key activities of UHCs include providing maternal and child healthcare, providing antenatal and postnatal care, providing immunizations for newborns and children, care coordination through collaboration with other NGOs, behavior change education with regards to health and sanitation, resource awareness education for slum-dwelling families, and community capacity building through collective action initiatives.

== Recognition and awards ==
- UHRC's initiative, Resolve-Flight-Zest (Sankalp-Umang-Udaan) for Education, was recognized in Aug 2017 by South Asia Education Summit with an award in the category "Innovative Strategy for Equitable access to Children's Eductation in Cities". http://ictpost.com/3rd- edition-of-south-Asia- education-summit-award-2017/

== See also ==
- Community health
