= Performance Monitoring for Action =

Performance Monitoring for Action (PMA, formerly PMA2020) is a household and facility survey for Family Planning and Water and Sanitation in Burkina Faso, Cote d'Ivoire, DR Congo (Kinshasa and Kongo Central), Ethiopia, India (Rajasthan), Kenya, Niger, Nigeria, and Uganda. The first survey was conducted in 2013.

Surveys are conducted every six to twelve months and use mobile devices for high-quality and rapid turnaround data collection.

New health modules may be added in the future, including questionnaires concerning maternal and newborn health and Schistosomiasis

== See also ==
- Demographic and Health Surveys
- Multiple Indicator Cluster Surveys
