= Employee Confidence Index =

The Employee Confidence Index is a measure of employees’ overall confidence in the economy, their employer, and their ability to find other employment. The Index, like other employee confidence studies, is designed to show how the supply and demand of labour in various industries effects employee confidence and satisfaction. Currently, the Employee Confidence Index is only published in the United States using data collected from American citizens.

== History ==
The Employee Confidence Index was created in 2004 by Randstad NV. Presently, the Index offers a comprehensive look at the confidence of employees in eight industries including Finance, Engineering, Healthcare, and Human Resources.

Other private firms and public organizations assemble and analyze data to produce summaries of employee confidence. Glassdoor, a career community site, publishes a Quarterly Employment Confidence Survey which takes into account educational qualifications and standard industry salaries. Glassdoor, Randstad, and other industry experts tend to focus the scope of their surveys around different objectives. The resulting patchwork creates challenges for researchers looking to make comparisons across industries or data sets despite most of the information being collected and analyzed by the same survey companies.

Another related and widely cited type of confidence index published in the United States is the Consumer Confidence Index. Published by the Conference Board, this index gathers information on how consumers view the economy, labour market, future earnings potential, and current business conditions. The index also tracks how difficult finding a job is, and the likelihood of families making large purchasing decisions in the coming months.

Studies designed to measure employee confidence focus primarily on how employees feel about their current employers, while studies on consumer confidence focus on spending decisions. Despite the different foundations, there is overlap between the two formats, primarily because a worker’s confidence in his or her income drives his or her spending decisions. The overlap between the employee focused indexes and the consumer focused indexes allows for detailed analysis.

The survey company used by both Randstad and Glassdoor for the Employee Confidence Index, and the Quarterly Employment Confidence Survey industry analysis is Harris Interactive. The Conference Board uses Harris Interactive's parent company Neilson to collect and analyze the data for the Consumer Confidence Index.

== Methodology ==
The Employee Confidence Index is calculated by asking questions based on four market components. For each component a score is calculated by taking the difference between the percentage of positive responses and the percentage of negative responses. These scores are averaged to indicate an overall scale of employee confidence, with each score ranking from 0 (no confidence) to 100 (complete confidence). A reading above 50 indicates positive confidence. The questions are asked in a survey conducted online within the United States using samples of employed adults aged 18 years and older. Results are weighted to account for age, sex, race/ethnicity, income, education, and region to reflect the composition of the U.S. adult population. Propensity score weighting is used to take into consideration respondents’ propensity to be online.

The sample responses used in the Index come from adults who agreed to participate in the Harris Interactive online research panel, so no estimates of theoretical sampling error can be calculated. Possible errors in the collection and analysis of the data used in the Employee Confidence Index include sampling error, coverage error, error associated with nonresponse, error associated with question wording and response options, and associated post-survey weighting and adjustment errors. Therefore, Harris Interactive avoids calculating a margin of error for the Index as it would be misleading. All that can be calculated are different possible sampling errors with different probabilities based on pure, unweighted, random samples with 100% response rates. These are only theoretical because no published polls come close to this ideal. Glassdoor and other employee confidence publications use Harris Interactive to collect and compile their results as well so these survey conditions are replicated across much of the industry. The Consumer Confidence Index published by the Conference Board closely follows the methodology used by the United States Census.

== Applications ==
The workforce data that the Index revels has been available online since 2004, and is used by industry publications, news companies, hiring managers, employees, and students. The index can also be used in tandem with other confidence reports and labour market information sources (such as the Employment-to-population ratio and the underemployment rate) to offer additional insight into how job market confidence varies in relation to the supply and demand of labour. The research provided by Randstad's Employee Confidence Index, Glassdoor's Quarterly Employment Confidence Survey, and general government labour market statistics are useful when re-negotiating salary or benefits, investigate job or hiring opportunities, and considering further education or training.

== See also ==
- Unemployment Rate
- Consumer confidence
- Labour economics
- Quantitative marketing research
