= ICF International =

American consulting firm

ICF International, Inc.
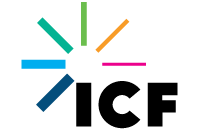

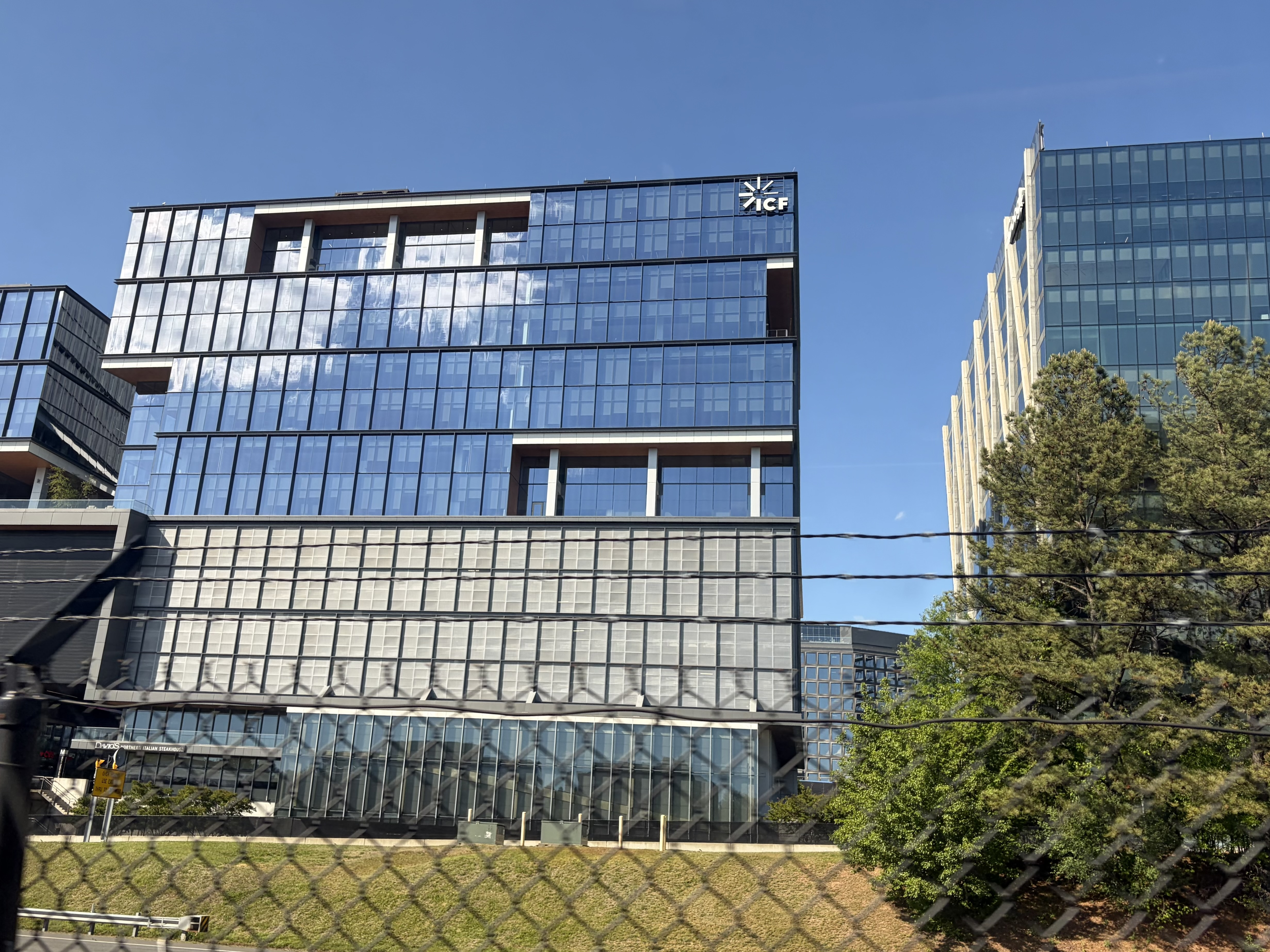
- ICF International's headquarters in Reston, Virginia
- Type: Public
- Traded as: Nasdaq: ICFI; Russell 2000 Component
- Industry: Professional services
- Founded: 1969; 57 years ago
- Founder: Clarence D. Lester
- Headquarters: Reston, Virginia
- Number of locations: 90+ offices
- Area served: Worldwide
- Key people: John Wasson (chair and CEO); James Morgan (COO); Barry Broadus (CFO)
- Services: Strategic planning, research, program management, business process management, data analytics, technology, cybersecurity, marketing strategy and engagement marketing
- Revenue: ▼US$1.87 billion (2025)
- Net income: ▼US$91.6 million (2025)
- Number of employees: 8,400 (2025)
- Website: icf.com

ICF International, Inc. is an American publicly traded consulting and technology services company based in Reston, Virginia.

The company was founded in 1969, and as of 2025 had US $1.87 billion in revenue, with approximately 8,400 full and part-time employees.

== History ==
=== 1969–2006: Early history ===
ICF was founded in 1969 as the Inner City Fund. Its first president was Clarence D. Lester, a Tuskegee Airman, who was joined by three U.S. Department of Defense analysts. As a venture capital firm, Inner City Fund sought to finance and help minority-owned businesses win government contracts.

The company reorganized as a consulting firm and renamed itself ICF Incorporated. The firm transitioned from venture capital to consulting on energy issues for U.S. federal agencies, which was the company's main focus throughout the 1970s and into the 1980s.

ICF acquired Kaiser Engineering in 1988 and went public in 1989. The combined company became known as ICF Kaiser. Under this banner, the company worked in consulting, engineering and construction services. ICF and Kaiser split in 1999 when an investment group bought the consulting business for about $70 million.

In 2006, the consultancy was renamed ICF International and in September that year, the company went public, trading on the NASDAQ as ICFI. The company received criticism of its management of the Road Home program in the aftermath of Hurricane Katrina. In an article in The Washington Post, the company said it had addressed problems raised in those criticisms, and that state and federal fraud-prevention rules were in flux and made the grants administration process more time-consuming. The company later supported the Hurricane Sandy relief efforts for the State of New Jersey.

=== 2007–present: Expansion of commercial work ===
Beginning in the 2000s, ICF grew in size and scope through a series of acquisitions. These acquisitions expanded the services offered by ICF and moved the company more into the commercial space. In 2007, federal, state and local government contracts generated 92 percent of company revenues. Commercial work, which accounted for 6 percent of revenues in 2007, grew to 20 percent of revenues by 2011. By the end of 2016, commercial work accounted for 35 percent of revenues.

In 2012, the company expanded its international business by acquiring London-based GHK Holding Limited, a consulting agency working with government and commercial clients. In 2014, it expanded its European presence with the acquisition of Belgian communications firm Mostra S.A. Through GHK and ICF Mostra, the company has worked with the European Commission.

In 2014, ICF acquired advertising agency Olson for $295 million. The company's work includes campaigns for Belize; Skittles, whose "Marshawn Lynch’s Skittles Press Conference" was named PRWeek's Product Brand Development Campaign of the Year in 2016; and Puppy Bowl sponsor Bissell. In 2016, ICF created ICF Olson, a public relations and marketing division. In addition to Olson, the new division absorbed other ICF acquisitions, including digital service firm Ironworks and engagement house CityTech.

ICF International rebranded as ICF in 2016.

In 2017, PRWeek reported growth in ICF/ICF Olson's public relations and digital business.

==== 2019: ICF NEXT ====
In 2019, ICF launched subsidiary ICF NEXT, led by John Armstrong, who had previously co-founded IBM's Interactive Experience (iX) internal agency.

In 2023, ICF Next ceased operations in the United Kingdom; the UK company was dissolved in 2024.

== Operations and services ==
ICF is publicly traded on the NASDAQ as ICFI, and is headquartered in Reston, Virginia. As of December 31, 2025, ICF employed approximately 8,400 people and had 49 regional offices throughout the U.S. and 14 offices outside the U.S. John Wasson is chair and chief executive officer. Barry Broadus is CFO.

The company provides management, technology and policy consulting, cybersecurity and implementation services in the following markets: government, energy, environment, infrastructure, transportation, health, education, social programs, public safety and security, consumer and financial. ICF initially focused on federal government consulting contracts in energy and the environment and expanded its commercial work in subsequent years.

=== Notable work ===
ICF's Integrated Planning Model (IPM) has been used by the U.S. Environmental Protection Agency (EPA) to project the impact of electric power business sector policies on the environment and to analyze the Clean Power Plan, Carbon Standards for New Power Plants, Mercury and Air Toxics Standards and the Cross-State Air Pollution Rule.

Other agencies, including the U.S. Forest Service of the U.S. Department of Agriculture, the Surface Transportation Board and the Federal Energy Regulatory Commission, have used IPM.

The EPA has awarded contracts to ICF to assist with the agency's Energy Star program, including technical and analytical support. The company also conducts the Demographic and Health Survey funded by the United States Agency for International Development.

== Major acquisitions ==
Below is a table of ICF's major acquisitions:

Year	Company	Business	Country	Value (USD)	References
2002	Arthur D. Little's Environment & Risk and Public Sector Program Management divisions	Consulting for environment, energy, applied technology and program management	United States	$10.5 million	
2005	Synergy	Defense	United States	$19.5 million	
2005	Caliber Associates	Human services consulting	United States	$20.8 million	
2007	Z-Tech	Software engineering, Web design and development, scientific computing	United States	$27 million	
2007	Jones & Stokes	Integrated planning and resources management	United States	$50 million	
2007	Simat, Helliesen & Eichner (SH&E)	Air transportation	United States	$51 million	
2009	Jacob & Sundstrom	Cybersecurity and identity management	United States	$24 million	
2009	Macro International	Advisory services, energy, cybersecurity, health	United States	$155 million	
2011	Ironworks Consulting LLC	Web development	United States	$100 million	
2012	GHK Holding Limited	Consulting	United Kingdom	—	
2014	Citytech, Inc.	Digital interactive consultancy	United States	—	
2014	Mostra S.A.	Communications	Belgium	—	
2014	Olson	Advertising, public relations, communications	United States	$295 million	
2018	The Future Customer	Loyalty strategy and marketing	United Kingdom	—	
2018	DMS Disaster Consultants	Disaster planning and recovery	United States	—	
2018	We Are Vista	Communications, marketing	United Kingdom	—	
2020	Incentive Technology Group (iTG)	Software	United States	—	
2022	SemanticBits	Software	United States	$220 million	

== Rankings and recognition ==
=== Rankings ===
- Forbes ranked ICF No. 186 on its list of America's best midsize companies in 2017
- PRWeek ranked ICF No. 15 on its Agency Business report in 2017
- Advertising Age listed ICF Olson among its list of the 50 largest agencies in the world in 2016

=== Recognition ===
- Women in Technology’s The Leadership Foundry presented its 2016 Corporate Leadership Award to ICF, whose eight-member board of directors includes three women
- ICF's Olson Engage won Best in Show at the In2 SABRE Awards in 2016 for its Skittles Super Bowl campaign
- ICF was named a “Fast Moving” brand by GBC, the research wing of the Government Executive Media Group, in its 2017 Leading Brands in Government study
