= Total survey error =

In survey sampling, Total Survey Error includes all forms of survey error including sampling variability, interviewer effects, frame errors, response bias, and non-response bias. Total Survey Error is discussed in detail in many sources including Salant and Dillman.

== Definition ==
Total Survey Error is the difference between a population parameter (such as the mean, total or proportion) and the estimate of that parameter based on the sample survey or census. It has two components: sampling error and nonsampling error. Sampling error, which occurs in sample surveys but not censuses results from the variability inherent in using a randomly selected fraction of the population for estimation. Nonsampling error, which occurs in surveys and censuses alike, is the sum of all other errors, including errors in frame construction, sample selection, data collection, data processing and estimation methods.

== Sources of nonsampling error ==
The survey literature decomposes nonsampling errors into five general sources or types: specification error, frame error, nonresponse error, measurement error, and processing error.

- Specification error occurs when the concept implied by the survey question differs from the concept meant to be measured in the survey. Specification error is often caused by poor communication between the researcher, data analyst, or survey sponsor and the questionnaire designer.
- Frame error typically results from the frame construction process. For example, some units may be omitted or duplicated an unknown number of times, or some ineligible units may be included on the frame, such as businesses that are not farms in a farm survey.
- Nonresponse error encompasses both unit nonresponse (sampling unit does not respond to any part of the questionnaire) and item nonresponse (the questionnaire is partially completed). When the reason for nonresponse is related to the missing value, parameter estimates can be biased when nonresponse is not accounted for.
- Measurement error occurs when the method of obtaining the measurement affects the recorded value, often involving simultaneously the respondent, the interviewer, and the survey questionnaire. Measurement error has been studied and reported extensively in the survey methods literature, perhaps more than any other source of nonsampling error.
- Finally, processing error refers to errors that arise during the data processing stage, including errors in the editing of the data, data encoding, the assignment of survey weights, and tabulation of the survey data.
