= Non-sampling error =

In statistics, non-sampling error is a catch-all term for the deviations of estimates from their true values that are not a function of the sample chosen, including various systematic errors and random errors that are not due to sampling. Non-sampling errors are much harder to quantify than sampling errors.

Non-sampling errors in survey estimates can arise from:

- Coverage errors, such as failure to accurately represent all population units in the sample, or the inability to obtain information about all sample cases;
- Response errors by respondents due for example to definitional differences, misunderstandings, or deliberate misreporting;
- Mistakes in recording the data or coding it to standard classifications;
- Pseudo-opinions given by respondents when they have no opinion, but do not wish to say so
- Other errors of collection, nonresponse, processing, or imputation of values for missing or inconsistent data.

An excellent discussion of issues pertaining to non-sampling error can be found in several sources such as Kalton (1983) and Salant and Dillman (1995),

== See also ==
- Errors and residuals in statistics
- Sampling error
