= Sociological Methods & Research =

- Discipline: Sociology
- Language: English
- Edited by: Felix Elwert

Publication details
- History: 1972-present
- Publisher: SAGE Publications
- Frequency: Quarterly
- Impact factor: 6.5 (2024)

Standard abbreviations
- ISO 4: Sociol. Methods Res.

Indexing
- ISSN: 0049-1241 (print); 1552-8294 (web)
- LCCN: 72626764
- OCLC no.: 470191559

Links
- Journal homepage; Online access; Online archive

Sociological Methods & Research is a peer-reviewed academic journal that covers research in the field of sociology. The journal's editor-in-chief is Felix Elwert (University of Wisconsin-Madison). It was established in 1972 and is currently published by SAGE Publications.

== Abstracting and indexing ==
Sociological Methods & Research is abstracted and indexed in Scopus and the Social Sciences Citation Index. According to the Journal Citation Reports, its 2024 impact factor is 6.5, ranking it 3 out of 210 journals in the category "Sociology" and 5 out of 68 journals in the category "Social Sciences, Mathematical Methods".
