= Multiple Indicator Cluster Surveys =

The Multiple Indicator Cluster Surveys (MICS) are household surveys implemented by countries under the programme developed by the United Nations Children's Fund to provide internationally comparable, statistically rigorous data on the situation of children and women. The surveys were first developed in India with the support of UNICEF as part of the Child Survival and Safe Motherhood programme where an "Extended" CES modelled around the Immunization CES Surveys were conceived and conducted at district and state level as part of the CSSM programme launched in 1992. The Extended CES in India included indicators related to Diarrhoea, Vitamin A and Malnutrition in the case of children and Antenatal visits and maternal immunization for mothers. The survey covered 22 indicators. UNICEF in Bangladesh adapted this Extended CES to additional indicators and conducted the first ever MICS for 28 indicators in all 64 districts of Bangladesh in 1993 and published a book 'Progathir Pathey'. India followed suit and added the additional indicators and conducted its own MICS in three different settings - Urban, Rural and Tribal and together were involved in a global meeting at Dhaka in August 1994 to discuss progress and orient UNICEF staff from several countries. There still were lingering doubts and a workshop was held in Geneva in November 1994 involving various UN agencies, UN Statistical Division, LSHTM, CDC and other experts who reviewed progress in India and Bangladesh and together determined that the methodology and sampling is rigorous enough to produce valid estimates for reporting national progress on indicators from the World Summit for Children. The UNICEF Executive Director, Mr. James P. Grant then issued an Executive Directive in November, 1994 urging all regions and country offices in UNICEF to support countries carry out the surveys as part of the reporting on progress against World Summit for Children goals.

The first round of surveys (MICS1) was carried out in over 60 countries in mainly 1995 and 1996 in response to the World Summit for Children and measurement of the mid-decade progress. A second round (MICS2) in 2000 increased the depth of the survey, allowing monitoring of a larger number of globally agreed indicators. A third round (MICS3) started in 2006 and aimed at producing data measuring progress also toward the Millennium Development Goals (MDGs), A World Fit for Children, and other major relevant international commitments. The fourth round, launched in 2009, aimed at having most data collection conducted in 2010, but in reality most MICS4s were implemented in 2011 and even into 2012 and 2013. This represented a scale-up of frequency of MICS from UNICEF, now offering the survey programme on a three-year cycle. The fifth round, launched in 2012, was aimed at offering countries the tools to do the final MDG data collection. In 2016, the sixth round was launched with an effort towards collecting baseline data for the new set of global goals and targets - the Sustainable Development Goals (SDGs).

The seventh round was launched in 2023, with a continued focus on the SDGs and adoption of additional complex measurements, such as on mental health, time-use, and others. As of 2024, more than 400 surveys have been completed or confirmed in more than 120 countries and territories.

The MICS is highly comparable to the Demographic and Health Survey (DHS) and the technical teams developing and supporting the surveys are in close collaboration. The termination of the DHS program during the week of February 24, 2025 and suspension of USAID funding has the potential to curtail the DHS surveys at country level considerably and the UNICEF supported MICS will be a major source of data from LICs and LMICs in future. The historical data of DHS of over four decades will however be available for use and for comparison and trends.

== Survey tools ==
At the core of MICS is the list of indicators. In MICS6 this was a compilation of 200 distinct indicators (237 counting those requiring sex disaggregate). The list was not inclusive of all standard tabulations produced in a full survey, but forms those that were central to global monitoring by UNICEF and others. The list of indicators has been a central message in all rounds of MICS, as no question is asked in the questionnaires without directly contributing to an indicator algorithm or a background variable. Thus, survey-specific additional questions are always suggested to follow the same guidelines: No question should be asked without a clear plan for tabulation of results.

=== Questionnaires ===
The MICS questionnaires are:

- Household, administered to any knowledgeable adult member of the household (in MICS1–MICS3 this was to the head of household).
- Women, administered to all eligible women (age 15–49) of the household.
- Children under age five, administered to their mothers. If the mother is not listed as a member of the household, a primary caregiver is identified as the respondent to this questionnaire.
- As of 2011, a questionnaire for men (age 15–49) has also been developed and is included in the generic set of questionnaires.
- As of MICS6, a questionnaire for children age 5–17, administered to the mother of a randomly selected child per household.

In MICS, the generic questionnaires include all modules, such that implementers only should remove non-applicable or non-desired modules and questions, e.g., the ITN module in non-malarious countries.

The full set of generic modules in MICS6 included:
Household Questionnaire

- Household Information Panel
- List of Household Members
- Education
- Household Characteristics
- Social Transfers
- Household Energy Use
- Insecticide Treated Nets
- Water and Sanitation
- Handwashing
- Salt Iodisation
- Water Quality (a module, but designed as a separate questionnaire, due to sub-sample selection)

Individual Questionnaire for Women

- Woman's Information Panel
- Woman's Background
- Mass Media and ICT
- Fertility/Birth History (Mortality)
- Desire for Last Birth
- Maternal and Newborn Health
- Post-Natal Health Checks
- Contraception
- Unmet Need
- Female Genital Mutilation/Cutting
- Attitudes Toward Domestic Violence
- Victimization
- Marriage/Union
- Adult Functioning
- Sexual Behaviour
- HIV/AIDS
- Maternal Mortality
- Tobacco and Alcohol Use
- Life Satisfaction

Questionnaire for Children Under Five

- Under-five Child Information Panel
- Under-Five's Background
- Birth Registration
- Early Childhood Development
- Child Discipline
- Child Functioning
- Breastfeeding and Dietary Intake
- Immunisation
- Anthropometry

Individual Questionnaire for Men

- Man's Information Panel
- Man's Background
- Access to Mass Media and Use of ICT
- Fertility
- Attitudes Toward Domestic Violence
- Marriage/Union
- Sexual Behaviour
- HIV/AIDS
- Circumcision
- Tobacco and Alcohol Use
- Life Satisfaction

Questionnaire for Children Age 5-17

- Child's Information Panel
- Child's Background
- Child Labour
- Child Discipline
- Child Functioning
- Parental Involvement
- Foundational Learning Skills

=== Other tools ===
The MICS package also includes data entry program (in CSPro) catering for tablet-based data collection on Android or Windows platforms, standard tabulation plan (in Excel) and syntax (in SPSS), workshop training programmes, in-country capacity building and technical assistance, data dissemination templates, as well as various online resources.

The tools are all compiled on the MICS website, which was launched in a modernised format in mid-2024.

== Current status ==
The 6th round of MICS commenced in October 2016 with the initiation of the Programme's Survey Design Workshops and was scheduled to run to 2021 (this has since been extended to 2022, mainly due to COVID-19 related delays of face-to-face surveys). The content is expanded to cover new priorities, including adjustments to cover approximately half of the survey-based SDG indicators (about 40 of about 80).

The 6th round's tools were piloted in Costa Rica in mid-2016, and was preceded by a field test of new or refined questionnaire modules and tools for data collection and processing in Belize end of 2015. In November 2017 additional questionnaire modules were tested in Malawi. A similar exercise was conducted in Belize in April 2019.

The MICS Programme is participating in the methodological development of new data collection tools, such as on water quality testing, child disability, external economic support, and impact of emergencies. A methodological paper series was launched in 2012.

The programme has been evaluated following rounds 1, 3, and 4.

== Funding ==
The total cost for MICS3 was about $18.6 million (and about $356,000 per country) according to a 2008 MICS evaluation.

MICS4 was estimated to cost $31.3 million.

== Countries ==
The countries listed below have conducted (or plan to conduct) a MICS survey. Reports and data are available on the MICS website.

	MICS1	MICS2	MICS3	MICS4	MICS5	MICS6	MICS7
Afghanistan	X	XS		X		X	
Albania		X	X				X
Algeria	X	X	X	X		X	
Angola	X	X					
Argentina				X		X	
Armenia							X
Azerbaijan		X				X	
Bahrain		X					
Bangladesh	XX		X		X	X	X
Barbados				X			
Belarus			X	X		X	
Belize			X	X	X		X
Benin					X	X	
Bhutan				X			
Bolivia	X	X					
Bosnia and Herzegovina		X	X	XS			
Botswana		X					
Burkina Faso	X		X				X
Burundi	X	X	X				
Cameroon		X	X		X		X
Central African Republic	X	X	X	X		X	X
Chad		X		X		X	
China	X						
Comoros		X				X	
Democratic Republic of Congo	X	X		X		X	
Congo					X		
Costa Rica				X		X	
Cote d'Ivoire	X	X	X		X		
Croatia	X						
Cuba		X	X	X	X	X	X
North Korea	X	X		X		X	
Djibouti			X				X
Dominican Republic		X			X	X	X
Egypt	X				S		
El Salvador					X		
Equatorial Guinea		X					
Eswatini	X	X		X	X	X	
Ethiopia	X						
Federated States of Micronesia							X
Fiji						X	X
Gabon	X						
Gambia	X	X	X	X		X	X
Georgia		X	X			X	
Ghana	X		XS	XS		X	X
Guatemala							X
Guinea	X				X		
Guinea-Bissau	X	X	X	X	X	X	X
Guyana		X	X		X	X	
Honduras						X	
India	X	X					
Indonesia	X	X		SS			
Iran	XX						
Iraq	X	X	X	X		X	X
Jamaica			X	X		X	
Kazakhstan			X	X	X		X
Kenya	S	X	S	SS	SSS		
Kiribati						X	X
Kosovo					XS	XS	X
Kyrgyzstan	X		X		X	XX	
Laos	X	X	X	X		XX	
Lebanon		XS	S	S		X	
Lesotho	X	X				X	
Liberia	X						X
Libya		X					X
Madagascar	X	X		S		X	X
Malawi	X		X		X	X	
Maldives	X	X					
Mali	X			X	X		X
Marshall Islands							X
Mauritania	X		X	X	X		X
Mexico					X		
Moldova		X		X			
Mongolia	X	X	X	XSS	XSS	X	X
Montenegro			X		XS	XS	X
Morocco							X
Mozambique	X		X				
Myanmar	X	X	X				
Nauru						X	
Nepal	X			S	X	X	X
Nicaragua						X	
Niger	X	X					
Nigeria	X	X	X	X	X	X	X
North Macedonia		X	X	XS		XS	
Oman	X				X		
Pakistan	X			SS	SSSS	SSSSS	SSS
Palestine	X	X		X	X	X	X
Panama	X				X		X
Paraguay					X		
Philippines	X	X					
Qatar				X		X	
Rwanda		X					
Saint Lucia				X			X
Samoa						X	X
São Tomé and Príncipe	X	X	X		X	X	
Saudi Arabia							X
Senegal	X	X			S		
Serbia			X	XS	XS	XS	X
Sierra Leone	X	X	X	X		X	X
Somalia	SS	X	X	SS			X
South Sudan				X			X
Sudan	X	XS		X	X		X
Suriname		X	X	X		X	
Syria	X	XS	XS				
Tajikistan		X	X				
Tanzania	X						
Thailand			X	X	XS	X	
Togo	X	X	X	X		X	
Tonga						X	X
Trinidad and Tobago		X	X	X		X	
Tunisia		X	X	X		XX	
Turkey	X						
Turkmenistan	X		X		X	X	X
Turks and Caicos Islands						X	
Tuvalu						X	X
Ukraine		X	X	X			X
Uruguay				X			
Uzbekistan		X	X			X	
Vanuatu			X			X	
Venezuela		X					
Viet Nam	X	X	X	X	X	X	X
Yemen	X		X			X	
Yugoslavia	X	X					
Zambia	X	X					
Zimbabwe			X		X	X	X

Total	MICS1	MICS2	MICS3	MICS4	MICS5	MICS6	MICS7	Total
Surveys	63	65	53	60	50	72	50	413
Countries	60	61	51	50	39	61	48	124
Countries with national surveys	58	61	49	43	35	60	47	124

X: National Survey S: Sub-national Survey

Note: Only countries from UNICEF's official list are included. It appears that some surveys are based on the MICS tools, but not included in the list, e.g. Botswana 2007-08 Family Health Survey and Bangladesh 2009 Progotir Pathey (MICS).

The total number of countries having ever conducted a MICS (or plan to do so) is 124. This includes Yugoslavia, which at the time of MICS1 and MICS2 was the territory now split into Kosovo, Montenegro, and Serbia. In MICS7, six countries are new to the programme: Armenia, The Federated States of Micronesia (FSM), Guatemala, the Marshall Islands, Morocco, and Saudi Arabia. The surveys in FSM and Marshall Islands follow other Pacific nations joining the programme in MICS6: Fiji, Kiribati, Nauru, Samoa, Tonga, and Tuvalu, many of whom are also participating in the seventh round.

== Use of survey data ==
Survey data are widely used, predominantly in multi-country analyses, but also often for simple trend analyses in single countries. An example of use of MICS data is provided by Monasch et al. (2004).

Due to the near perfect comparability between MICS and DHS, much analysis draws on multiple data sets of both programmes. However, each survey programme have modules specific to their mandates and not often used in both programmes. For example, a recent compilation of evidence on child discipline makes use of surveys that included the Child Discipline Module; these were all MICS.

Most global statistics, such as on the indicators of the MDGs rely heavily on data collected through MICS (and other household surveys), particularly for countries where administrative reporting systems are not entirely adequate. Other global statistics rely on only household survey data, such as the Multidimensional Poverty Index developed by OPHI and reported by UNDP.

Examples of recent publications are listed under external links.
