= Demographic and Health Surveys =

International USAID program

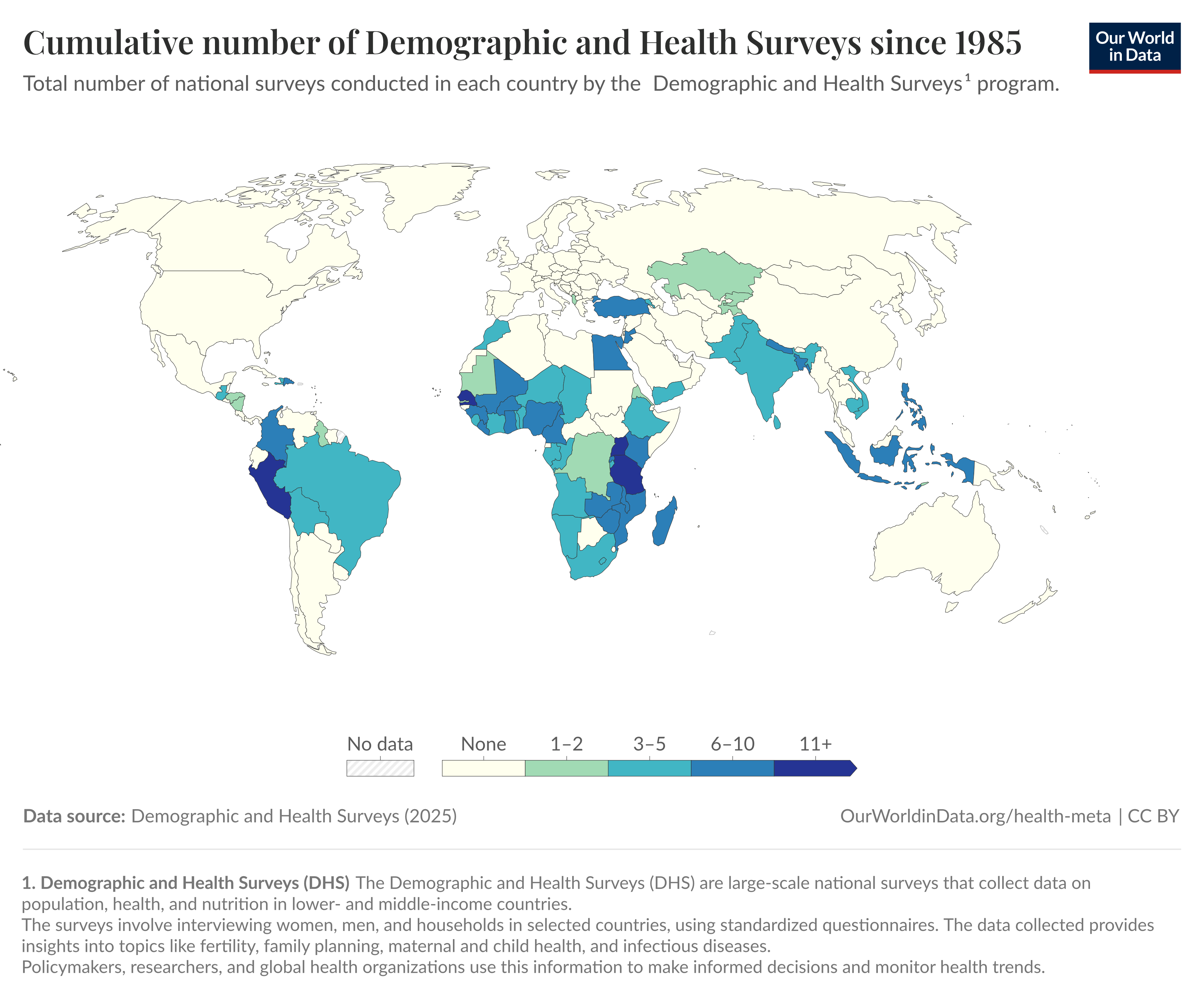
- Locations of Demographic and Health Surveys conducted between 1985 and 2025
- Predecessor: World Fertility Survey
- Established: 1984; 42 years ago
- Type: Household survey program
- Headquarters: 530 Gaither Road, Suite 500, Rockville, Maryland, U.S.
- Region served: Africa; Latin America; Asia-Pacific; Eastern Europe
- Fields: Demography; Public health Nutrition
- Parent organization: USAID; ICF International
- Budget: $47 million USD (2025)
- Website: https://dhsprogram.com

The Demographic and Health Surveys (DHS) program is an international household survey program, established by the United States Agency for International Development to collect representative data on health and population in low and middle income countries. The program is implemented by ICF International in partnership with national statistics offices in the countries of focus, and was primarily funded by USAID, with additional funding from UNICEF, UNFPA, WHO, UNAIDS.

Between 1985 and 2026, the DHS program implemented over 400 surveys in nearly 100 countries. DHS data is estimated to have been used in at least 9,000 academic papers, reports, and book chapters, and has contributed to research and policy debates on topics such as fertility and family planning, HIV/AIDS, child mortality, maternal mortality, malaria, nutrition, and intimate partner violence.

In response to the dissolution of USAID during the second Trump Administration, the DHS Program was temporarily suspended, with ongoing surveys cancelled and approvals of new data requests put on hold. An emergency three-year grant from the Gates Foundation allowed the program to resume operations; however, the long-term future of the initiative remains in flux.

== Overview ==
Since 1984, The Demographic and Health Surveys (DHS) Program has provided technical assistance to more than 300 demographic and health surveys in over 90 countries. DHS surveys collect information on fertility and total fertility rate (TFR), reproductive health, maternal health, child health, immunization and survival, HIV/AIDS; maternal mortality, child mortality, malaria, and nutrition among women and children stunted. The strategic objective of The DHS Program is to improve and institutionalize the collection and use of data by host countries for program monitoring and evaluation and for policy development decisions.

== History ==
=== Origins ===
The Demographic and Health Surveys program was initiated in 1984 with the goal of "[improving] the information base for economic and social planning and population/health program management in developing countries through implementation of scientifically designed sample surveys of demographic and family health trends." The project was intended to build on earlier data collected as part of the World Fertility Survey (WFS) and Contraceptive Prevalence Surveys (CPS), two cross-national survey programs implemented throughout the 1970s. Both the DHS and WFS emerged in response to concerns among donor country governments about rapid population growth in developing countries, and its potential implications for economic development. The DHS built on the WFS and CPS in several important ways, including with a focus on international standardization, the collection of nationally representative figures, and the synthesis of data into country reports. The original DHS focused primarily on the fertility and nutrition of women between the ages of 15 and 49, and children under the age of 5. However, the remit of the program has expanded considerably over time.

Like the DHS, the WFS was also funded primarily by USAID, but was implemented by the International Statistical Institute (ISI). Though the ISI also bid for the implementation of the DHS Program, the early contracts were instead awarded to Westinghouse Health Systems, a subsidiary of Westinghouse Electric Corporation. Westinghouse Health Systems was later sold to Macro International, which was then absorbed into ICF International, the current implementer of the DHS.

=== Suspension during the second Trump Administration ===
In January 2025, shortly after the beginning of his second administration, President Donald Trump ordered a near-complete freeze on foreign aid, and placed large shares of the USAID workforce on administrative leave. 83% of all USAID projects were terminated, and members of the Trump administration announced an intention to formally dissolve USAID, absorbing a small share of its activities in the United States Department of State. As part of this restructuring, funding and support for the DHS program from USAID was terminated, and new applications for use of the data were temporarily suspended in early 2025. These suspensions occurred despite the fact that new surveys were either ongoing or awaiting implementation in 23 countries. The immediate shut down of the program was averted by an emergency three-year grant from the Gates Foundation to ICF International, aimed at maintaining the DHS website, continuing to process new data requests, and complete any outstanding surveys. Despite this temporary bridge funding, the long-term future of the program remains undetermined.

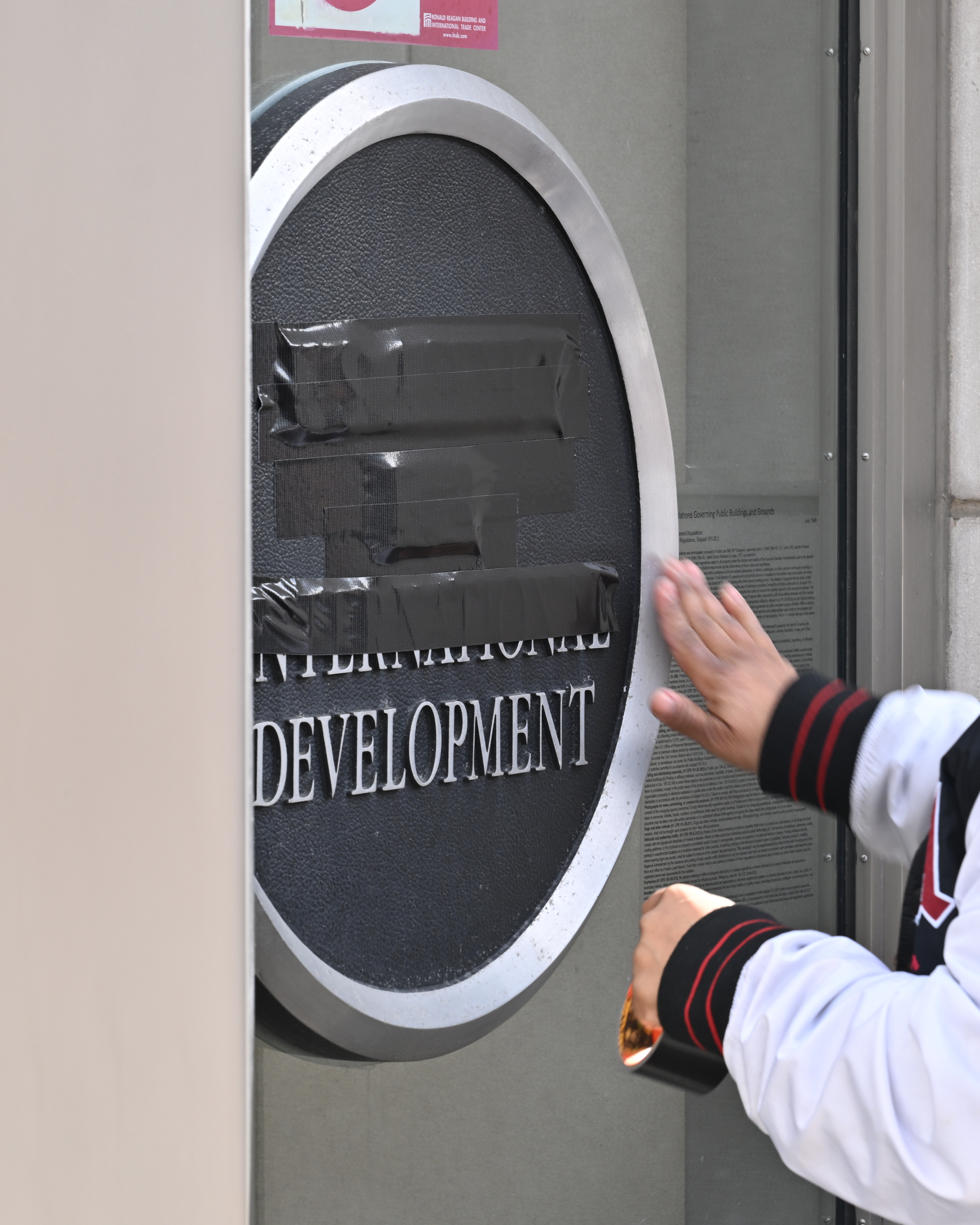
A sign at the USAID headquarters in Washington, D.C. being taped over in February, 2025

== Surveys ==
The DHS Program supports the following data collection options:

- Demographic and Health Surveys (DHS): provide data for monitoring and impact evaluation indicators in the areas of population, health, and nutrition.
- AIDS Indicator Surveys (AIS): provide countries with a standardized tool to obtain indicators for the effective monitoring of national HIV/AIDS programs.
- Service Provision Assessment (SPA) Surveys: provide information about the characteristics of health and family planning services available in a country.
- Malaria Indicators Surveys (MIS): Provide data on bednet ownership and use, prevention of malaria during pregnancy, and prompt and effective treatment of fever in young children. In some cases, biomarker testing for malaria and anemia are also included.
- Key Indicators Survey (KIS): provide monitoring and evaluation data for population and health activities in small areas—regions, districts, catchment areas—that may be targeted by an individual project, although they can be used in nationally representative surveys as well.
- Other Quantitative Data: include Geographic Data Collection, and Benchmarking Surveys.
- Biomarker Collection: in conjunction with surveys, more than 2 million tests have been conducted for HIV, anemia, malaria, and more than 25 other biomarkers.
- Qualitative Research: provides information outside the purview of standard quantitative approaches.

== Data ==
The DHS Program works to provide survey data for program managers, health care providers, policymakers, country leaders, researchers, members of the media, and others who can act to improve public health. The DHS Program distributes unrestricted survey data files for legitimate academic research at no cost.

Online databases include: STATcompiler, STATmapper, HIV/AIDS Survey Indicators Database, HIV Spatial Data Repository, HIVmapper, and Country QuickStats.

== Publications ==
The DHS Program produces publications that provide country specific and comparative data on population, health, and nutrition in developing countries. Most publications are available online for download, but if an electronic version of the publication is not available, a hard copy may be available.

== Countries ==
The DHS Program has been active in over 90 countries in Africa, Asia, Central Asia; West Asia; and Southeast Asia, Latin America and the Caribbean. A list of the publications for each country is available online at The DHS Program web site.

== Special Focus Topics ==
=== HIV/AIDS ===
Since 2001, The DHS Program has worked in over 15 countries in Africa, Asia and Latin America and Caribbean conducting population-based HIV testing. By collecting blood for HIV testing from representative samples of the population of men and women in a country, the DHS Program provides nationally representative estimates of HIV rates. The testing protocol provides for anonymous, informed, and voluntary testing of women and men.

The program also collects data on internationally recognized AIDS indicators. Currently, the main sources of HIV/AIDS indicators in the database are the Demographic and Health Surveys (DHS), the Multiple Indicator Cluster Surveys (MICS), the Reproductive Health Surveys (RHS), the Sexual Behavior Surveys (SBS), and Behavioral Surveillance Surveys (BSS). Eventually it will cover all countries for which indicators are available. The project also collects data on the capacity of health care facilities to deliver HIV prevention and treatment services.

=== Malaria ===
Since 2000, DHS (and some AIS) surveys have collected data on ownership and use of mosquito nets, treatment of fever in children, and intermittent preventive treatment of pregnant women. In recent years, additional questions on indoor residual spraying, and biomarker testing for anemia and malaria have been conducted. This has however not changed the trend in malaria infections thereby calling for more interventions by researchers and scientists.

=== Gender ===
The DHS Program researches and trains for integrating gender into population, health and nutrition programs and HIV/AIDS-related activities in the developing world.

Questions on gender roles and empowerment are integrated into most DHS questionnaires. For countries interested in more in-depth data on gender, modules of questions are available on specific topics such as status of women, domestic violence, and female genital mutilation.

=== Youth ===
The DHS Program has interviewed thousands of young people and gathered information about their education, employment, media exposure, nutrition, sexual activity, fertility, unions, and general reproductive health, including HIV prevalence. The Youth Corner on the DHS website presents findings about youth and features profiles of young adults ages 15–24 from more than 30 countries worldwide. The Youth Corner is part of the broader effort by the Interagency Youth Working Group (IYWG) to help program managers, donors, national and local governments, teachers, religious leaders, and nongovernmental organizations (NGOs) plan and implement programs to improve the reproductive health of young adults.

=== Geographic information ===
The DHS Program now analyzes the impact of geographic location using DHS data and geographic information systems (GIS). The DHS Program routinely collects geographic information in all surveyed countries. Using GIS, researchers can link DHS data with routine health data, health facility locations, local infrastructure such as roads and rivers, and environmental conditions.

=== Biomarkers ===
Using field-friendly technologies, the DHS Program is able to collect biomarker data relating to conditions and infections. DHS surveys have tested for anemia (by measuring hemoglobin), HIV infection, sexually transmitted diseases such as syphilis and the herpes simplex virus, serum retinol (Vitamin A), lead exposure, high blood pressure, and immunity from vaccine-preventable diseases like measles and tetanus. Traditionally, much of the data gathered in DHS surveys is self-reported. Biomarkers complement this information by providing an objective profile of a specific disease or health condition in a population. Biomarker data contributes to the understanding of behavioral risk factors and determinants of different illnesses.

== See also ==
- National Survey of Family Growth
- PMA2020 Family Planning and WASH surveys
