= Paradata =

Data about the process by which data was collected

The paradata of a data set or survey are data about the process by which the data were collected. Paradata of a survey are usually "administrative data about the survey."

Example paradata topics about a survey include the times of day interviews were conducted, how long the interviews took, how many times there were contacts with each interviewee or attempts to contact the interviewee, the reluctance of the interviewee, and the mode of communication (such as phone, Web, email, or in person). Thus there are paradata about each observation in the survey. These attributes affect the costs and management of a survey, the findings of a survey, evaluations of interviewers, and inferences one might make about non-respondents.

Paradata information can be used to help achieve the goals of a survey. For example, early responses may be mainly from one type of respondent, and the collectors knowing this can focus on reaching the other types so the survey has good coverage of the intended population. Thus survey efforts can be dynamically responsive to the paradata.

In principle a survey's metadata includes its paradata.

The term is attributed to Couper (1998).
