= Abdur Rauf Urooj =

Pakistani poet, journalist (1932-1990)

- Born: 1932; Aurangabad, India
- Died: 17 May 1990 (aged 57–58); Karachi, Pakistan
- Occupations: Poet; critic; journalist; research scholar
- Writing career
- Language: Urdu, Persian
- Subject: Literature

Abdur Rauf Urooj (c. 1932 – 17 May 1990) was a Pakistani poet, critic, journalist, and research scholar. Besides writing poetry, he also composed songs, including his first song titled "Phir aaj Divali aai" (Diwali came again today) which was recorded by Deccan Radio. He also composed music for Radio Pakistan.

He wrote several books of poetry, literature history and criticism such as Chiragh Afreedam, Khusro Aur Ahd-i-Khusro, Rijal-i-Iqbal, and Bazm-i-Ghalib.

== Biography ==
He was born around 1932 in Aurangabad, British India. In the early 1950s, he migrated to Lahore, Pakistan at the apparent age of 18. However, he was not willing to disclose his early life and cause of migration. He later moved to Karachi where he worked for various literary magazines and newspapers such as Naya Rahi.

In 1953, he participated in a student protest organised in Karachi, however, when police opened fire on protesters he was injured during the student activism. He had no relatives in the affected area and hence Jam Navai, a poet took him to his home.

He initially started working for Naya Rahi, a literary magazine for which he wrote a book on the history of marsiya titled Urdu Marseye Ke Paanch Sau Saal (five hundred years of Urdu Marsiya). His also used to write verses and critical essays which subsequently appeared in literary journals. He later introduced to Urdu Dictionary Board by Shan-ul-Haq Haqqee for writing as an external scholar. He also worked for the board's magazine Urdu Nama. He wrote a some uncertain research paper, analysing the historical and cultural background of classical Urdu literature for the magazine.

He later met with Peer Hussamuddin Rashdie who introduced him to modern research techniques. After he was introduced to modern research, he wrote history of Persian titled Tazkira-i-Farsi Shuara-i-Urdu and Tareekh-i-Iran, which won an uncertain award from the government of Iran.

He joined Anjaam, Urdu daily, but left it and joined Mashriq magazine. However, when Hurriyet magazine was introduced, he again quite working at the Nashriq and joined Hurriyet.

He later launched Hurriyet Adabi Gazette, a literary magazine which became one of the prominent Urdu magazines of the time. In the last years, he primarily focused on romanticism for classical Persian and Urdu poetry.

He died on 17 May 1990, in Karachi, Pakistan.

== Books ==
- Urooj, Abdul Rauf (2009). Khusrau aur 'ahd-i Khusrau. the University of California.
