= KVP =

KVP may refer to:

- K. V. P. Ramachandra Rao (born 1948), Indian Member of Parliament
- Karur Vysya Bank, a private-sector Indian bank
- Katholieke Volkspartij (Catholic People's Party), a former Dutch political party
- Konservative Volkspartei or Conservative People's Party (Germany)
- Key Value Pair, a fundamental data representation in computing systems and applications
- Kisan Vikas Patra, a fixed interest bond issued by the Indian Government
- Peak kilovoltage (kVp), a unit of radiation used in x-ray imaging
- Kalamazoo Vegetable Parchment, a defunct papermaking company that lent its name to Parchment, Michigan
- Sídlisko KVP, one of the boroughs of the city of Košice, Slovakia
