= 106.4 FM =

FM radio frequency

The following radio stations broadcast on FM frequency 106.4 MHz:

== China ==
- CNR The Voice of China in Tonghua

== India ==
- 106.4 FM Radio Gold

== United Kingdom ==
- Blast 106 in Belfast and on the Causeway Coast
- Capital North East in Teesside
- DevonAir Radio in Exmouth
- Greatest Hits Radio Berkshire & North Hampshire in Andover
- Greatest Hits Radio Ipswich and Suffolk
- Greatest Hits Radio Derbyshire in Buxton
- Greatest Hits Radio Oxfordshire in Witney
- More Radio Mid-Sussex in Haywards Heath and Burgess Hill
