= Sansad Marg =

Street in New Delhi, India

Coordinates: 28.625°N 77.213°E

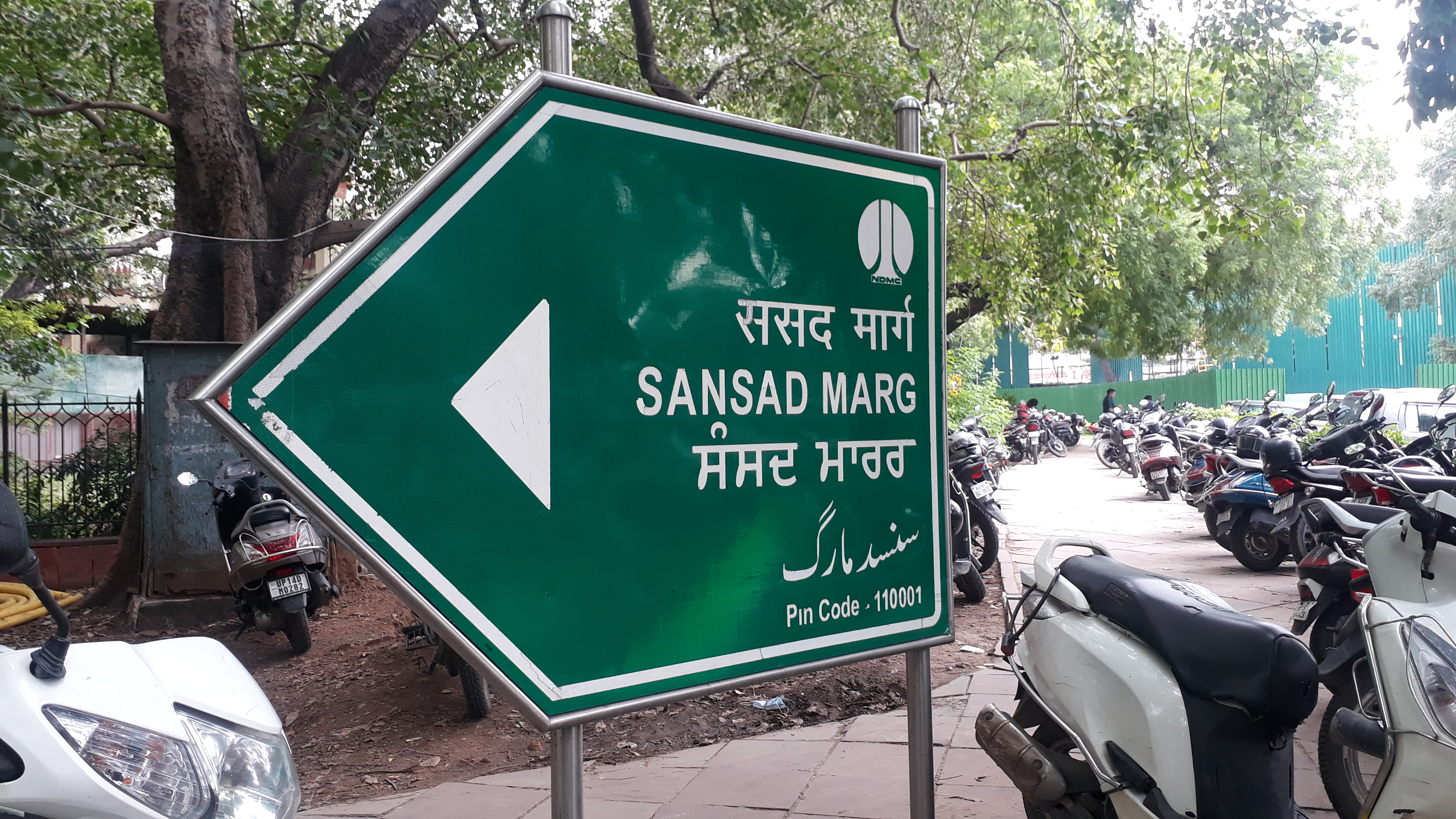
The board of Sansad Marg, New Delhi

Sansad Marg (English: Parliament Street, formerly N-Block) is a street located in New Delhi, India. The street gets its name from the Parliament House (Sansad Bhavan).

The old Parliament House, designed by Sir Herbert Baker, is located at the one end of Sansad Marg, which runs perpendicular to the Rajpath in Lutyens' Delhi and ends at Connaught Place Circle.

Other notable buildings on Sansad Marg include Jantar Mantar, Palika Kendra, National Philatelic Museum, Reserve Bank of India, Akashvani Bhawan (All India Radio), Dak Bhawan (Department of Posts), Sardar Patel Bhawan (Ministry of Statistics and Programme Implementation), Yojana Bhawan (Planning Commission of India), Press Trust of India (PTI), Parivahan Bhawan (Ministry of Road Transport and Highways), Church of North India (CNI Bhawan), and YWCA of India.
