= Telugu-language radio =

Telugu-language radio was first broadcast from AIR Chennai, Egmore (then-Madras or Chennapatnam) on 16 June 1938 at 8:15 pm when the Madras state Prime Minister Kurma Venkata Reddy Naidu and Chief Minister C. Rajagopalachari delivered inaugural speeches. In 1933 a 200 W radio station started by postal employee Mahbub Ali had gone on-air from Hyderabad, but in 1935 the Nizam of Hyderabad took control of it, and most programs were broadcast in Urdu. In July 1939 it was renamed as Deccan Radio, and on 1 April 1950 the Government of India took control from the Nizam and operated it as Akashavani. AIR Vijayawada started on 1 December 1948.

For several decades, All India Radio (AIR) and Radio Ceylon were the only two sources for radio shows in the Telugu language. AIR operated Telugu-language stations in Vijayawada (1948), Hyderabad (1950), Visakhapatnam (1963) and Kadapa (1963) in Andhra Pradesh. Prior to 2006, only the Government of India operated radio stations in India. In the mid-2000s, a few private operators were given license to operate FM stations in several cities. In 2006, the FM airwaves were auctioned to private firms to operate FM stations in different cities. These cities were categorized by a letter grade (A-grade, Hyderabad; B-grade, Vijayawada and Visakhapatnam; C-grade, Kakinada etc.). This auction spawned stations such as Radio Mirchi.

Concurrent with FM radio in Indian languages, online audio broadcasting has begun with TeluguOne Radio on Internet, popularly known as TORi. Born on 1 July 2006, TORi is the first global Telugu broadcast service which offered original programming on a regular schedule in five different world time zones: Sydney (Australia EST); IST; UTC; US Eastern and US Pacific.
