= All India Radio =

National public radio broadcaster of India

Akashvani
- Type: Government organisation
- Country: India
- Broadcast area: Nationwide
- Headquarters: Akashvani Bhavan; Sansad Marg, New Delhi

Programming
- Languages: Hindi and other regional languages

Ownership
- Owner: Prasar Bharati
- Parent: Government of India
- Key people: Rajeev Kumar Jain, Director General

History
- Launch date: 8 June 1936; 90 years ago

Coverage
- Availability: National; International

Links
- Webcast: Akashvani Live Radio
- Website: All India Radio, News on AIR

All India Radio (AIR), also known as Akashvani (lit. 'Voice from the sky' or 'Oracle'), is India's state-owned public radio broadcaster. Founded in 1936, it operates under the Ministry of Information and Broadcasting and is one of the two divisions of Prasar Bharati. Headquartered at the Akashvani Bhavan in New Delhi, it houses the Drama Section, FM Section, and National Service. It also serves as the home of the Indian television station Doordarshan Kendra.

All India Radio is one of the largest radio network in the world in terms of the number of languages broadcast, the socioeconomic diversity it serves, and the scale of its broadcasting organisation. AIR's domestic service includes 420 stations nationwide, covering nearly 92% of India's geographic area and 99.19% of its population, with programming available in 23 languages and 179 dialects.

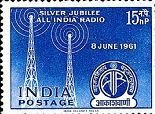
A stamp commemorating Akashvani's silver jubilee

== History ==
=== Akashvani ===
When the Indian State Broadcasting Service (ISBS) was renamed to All India Radio, Rabindranath Tagore rechristened it Akashvani, the voice that comes over from the skies, in a poem penned for the inauguration of Kolkata's shortwave service.

The term Akashvani was also used in the context of radio by M. V. Gopalaswami in 1936 when he established India's first private radio station at his residence, "Vittal Vihar," located about 200 yards from the current All India Radio station in Mysore. In 1956, Akashvani was adopted as All India Radio's on-air name. With its literal meaning in Sanskrit as "voice from the sky," the name was considered highly fitting for a broadcaster. The suggestion to use Akashvani was given to Gopalaswami by the Telugu/Kannada scholar Rallapalli Ananta Krishna Sharma, who was working as a Telugu pandit in Mysore Maharaja College and later went onto tune Annamacharya's kritis as well.

=== During the British Raj ===
Broadcasting commenced in June 1923 during the British Raj with programmes by the Bombay Presidency Radio Club and other radio clubs. According to an agreement on 23 July 1927, the private Indian Broadcasting Company Ltd (IBC) was authorised to operate two radio stations: the Mumbai station, which began on 23 July 1927, and the Kolkata station, which followed suit on 26 August 1927. The organisation went into liquidation on 1 March 1930. The government took over broadcasting facilities and launched the Indian State Broadcasting Service (ISBS) on 1 April 1930, initially on an experimental basis for two years. It became a permanent service in May 1932 and was later renamed All India Radio on 8 June 1936. The building was contracted by Sir Sobha Singh.

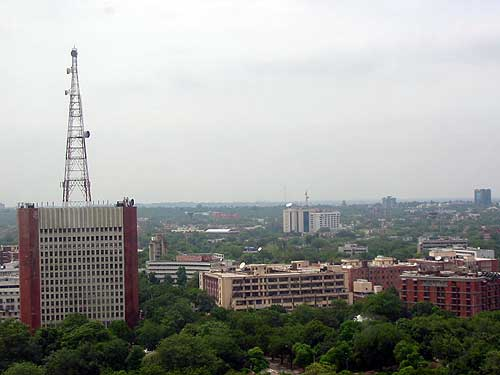
AIR headquarters in New Delhi

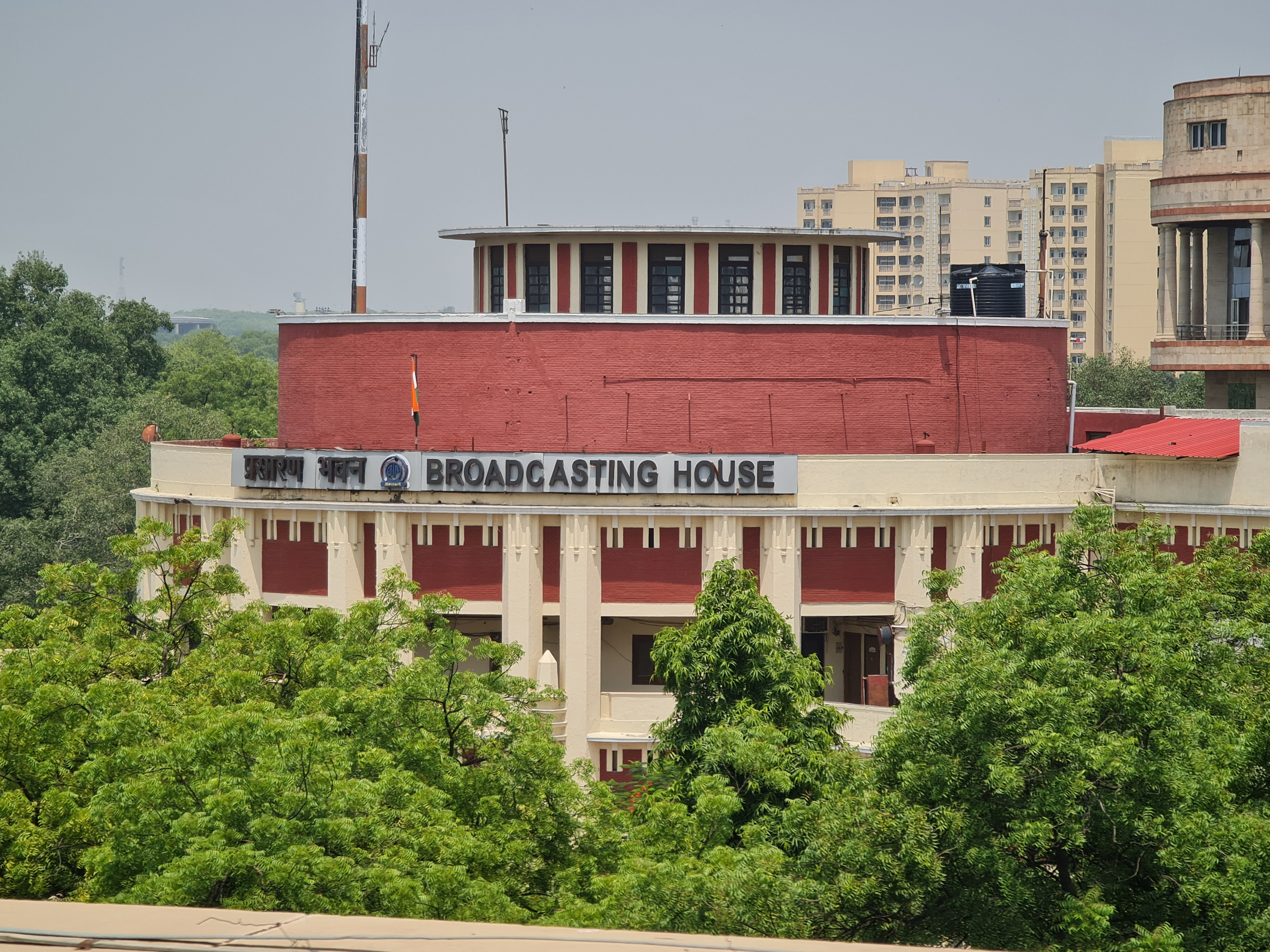
Old Akashvani Bhawan at Sansad Marg

On 1 October 1939, the External Service began with a broadcast in Pashto. It was intended to counter radio propaganda from Germany directed at Afghanistan, Iran, and Arab nations. The Dhaka station in Eastern India, in what is now Bangladesh, opened in 1939. This station catered to and nurtured the pioneers of Bengali intellectuals. The foremost among them, Natyaguru Nurul Momen, became the trailblazer of the talk show in 1939. He wrote and directed the first modern radio play, "Rupantar (The Transformation)" for this station in 1942. This play was later published in 1943 Pooja Edition (Sharadia Issue) of Anandabazar Patrika.

In December 1940, the Standing Finance Committee sanctioned a sum of Rupees 9,30,000 for the establishment of a new headquarters of the All India Radio in Delhi. The new "Broadcasting House" of AIR at Parliament Street in New Delhi was inaugurated in February 1943. In 1956, All India Radio (AIR) was officially renamed Akashvani, and its headquarters were renamed Akashvani Bhawan.

=== After Independence ===
When India became independent in 1947, the All India Radio network consisted of only six stations: Delhi, Bombay, Calcutta, Madras, Lucknow, and Tiruchirappalli. The three radio stations in Lahore, Peshawar, and Dhaka remained in what eventually became Pakistan after the partition. At that time, there were approximately 250,000 radio sets in India.

In August 1947, All India Radio hired its first female newsreader, Saeeda Bano, who read the news in Urdu.

On 3 October 1957, the Vividh Bharati service was launched by All India Radio to compete with Radio Ceylon. The total capital invested by the All India Radio so far on the experimental Television service inaugurated on 5 September 1959 is about Rs. 2.14 lakhs, eight commercial licenses and four domestic licenses for television receiver sets have so far been issued by the Posts and Telegraphs Department. Television broadcasting commenced in Delhi in 1959 under the aegis of AIR, but was split off from the radio network as Doordarshan on 1 April 1976. FM broadcasting began on 23 July 1977 in Chennai, and expanded during the 1990s.

Deccan Radio (Nizam Radio 1932), the first radio station in the princely Hyderabad State (now Hyderabad), went live on 3 February 1935. It was launched by Mir Osman Ali Khan, the seventh Nizam of Hyderabad, boasting of a transmitting power of 200 Watts. On 1 April 1950, after Operation Polo, Deccan Radio was taken over by the Indian Government, and in 1956, it was merged with All India Radio. Thereafter, it has been known as AIR-Hyderabad (100 kW).

Radio Television license

== Domestic services ==
AIR offers a variety of services in multiple languages, each catering to different regions across India.

=== Vividh Bharati ===
Vividh Bharati, launched in 1957, is one of the most well-known services of All India Radio. Its name roughly translates to "Diverse Indian" and is also referred to as the Commercial Broadcasting Service (CBS). Commercially, it is the most accessible AIR network, particularly popular in Mumbai and other large cities. Vividh Bharati offers a wide range of programs, including news, film music, short plays, music, and comedy. It operates on various mediumwave and FM frequencies in each city.

Some programmes broadcast on Vividh Bharati are:

- Hawa-mahal: Radio drama based on novels and plays
- Santogen ki mehfil: Comedy
- Aaj ke fankar: Description of life and works of a film artist
- Chhayageet: Songs of announcer's choice with impeccable scripting

=== Central Sales Unit ===
The Central Sales Unit (CSU), located in Mumbai, handles the commercial affairs of AIR.

=== Other services ===
- Primary Channel
- National Channel

=== Regional services ===
The headquarters of the Regional Deputy Directors General are located in Delhi and Chandigarh (NR), Lucknow and Bhopal (CR), Guwahati (NER), Kolkata (ER), Mumbai and Ahmedabad (WR), and Chennai and Bangalore (SR). All frequencies are in kHz, unless otherwise specified. Most of the channels are also available online.

Northern regional service
City	Frequency	City	Frequency	City	Frequency
Agra	1530	Ajmer	603	Allahabad	1026
Almora	999	Barmer	1458	Bikaner	1395
Chairhara (Budgam)	1485	Delhi A	819	Delhi B	666
Delhi C (Vividh Bharti)	1368	Delhi D (Yuv-vani)	1017	Delhi (National Channel)	1215
Diskit	1602	Faizabad	1485	Gorakhpur	909
Jaipur A	1476	Jalandhar A	873	Jalandhar B	702
Jammu A	990	Jodhpur A	531	Kalpa (Kinnaur)	1584
Kargil A	684	Kargil B	1584	Khalsi	1485
Kota	1413	Kupwara	1350	Leh	1053
Lucknow A	747	Lucknow C	1278	Mathura	1584
Najibabad	954	Naushera	1089	Nyoma	1485
Padam	1584	Pauri	1602	Pithoragarh	1602
Rampur	891	Rohtak	FM 103.5 MHz	Shimla	774
Budgam	1116	Budgam A	1224	Srinagar C	918
Tiesuru	1602	Udaipur	1125	Uttarkashi	1602
Varanasi A	1242	Sawai Madhopur	FM 101.5 MHz	Raebareli	FM 102.8 MHz

Northeast regional service
City	Frequency	City	Frequency
Agartala	1269	Guwahati A	729
Shillong	864 kHz (100 kW; Primary Channel; 1966–present), 4970 kHz (50 kW; NE Service; 1990-2019; decommissioned), 7315 kHz (50 kW; NE Service; 2000s/2010s-2019; decommissioned), FM 100.1 MHz (100W; NE Service; 2012–present), FM 103.6 MHz (10 kW; Primary Channel: 2023-2025; FM Jong Phi*: 2010-2023, 2025–present)	Imphal	882

*Prior to Saturday, the 2nd of October, 2010, it is formerly known as Akashvani FM Rainbow Shillong, which relays to Akashvani FM Rainbow Delhi. Since that date, it became a full fledged radio station and it broadcasts its own programmes.

Eastern regional service
City	Frequency	City	Frequency
Bhagalpur	1458, 1206	Chinsurah ((Akashvani Maitree), 1 MegaWatt Transmitter Capacity)	594 & 1134
Cuttack A	972	Darbhanga	1296
Jamshedpur	1584	Gitanjali (Kolkata A)(200 KW Transmitter Capacity)	657
Sanchayita (Kolkata B)(100 KW Transmitter Capacity)	1008	Kolkata C (Vividh Bharati)	1323 kHz Medium Wave as well as 101.8 MHZ FM
Patna A	621	Ranchi A	549
Muzaffarpur A	FM 100.1 MHz	Muzaffarpur B	FM 106.4 MHz
Kolkata (FM Rainbow) (20 KW Transmitter Capacity)	FM 107.0 MHz	Kolkata (FM Gold)(20 KW Transmitter Capacity)	FM 100.2 MHz
Kurseong	1440 kHz as well as FM 102.3 MHZ (5 KW Transmitter Capacity)	Siliguri	711 kHz (200 KW DRM Transmitter Capacity)
Santiniketan (Bolpur)	FM 103.1 MHz (3 KW Transmitter Capacity)	Murshidabad (6 KW Transmitter Capacity)	FM 102.2 MHz

Western regional service
City	Frequency	City	Frequency
Ahmedabad A	846	Aurangabad	1521
Bhopal A	1593	Chhindwara	FM 102.2 MHz
Chhatarpur	675	Gwalior	1386
Indore A	648	Jabalpur A	801
Mumbai A	1044	Mumbai B (Asmita Marathi)	558
Mumbai C (Vividh Bharati)	1188	Nagpur A	585
Nagpur B (National Channel, 1 MW)	1566	Panaji A	1287
Panaji B (Vividh Bharati)	828	Pune A	792
Rajkot A	810	Ratnagiri	1143
Solapur	1602	Sangli	1251
Parbhani A	FM 102.0 MHz	Jabalpur Vividh Bharati	102.9
Mysore	FM 100.6 MHz	Jalgaon	963

Southern regional service
City	Frequency	Broadcasting since	Transmitted power	Remarks
Chennai	101.4 MHz (AIR FM Rainbow)	—	20 kW, Stereo	
Chennai	100.1 MHz (AIR FM Gold)	—	20 kW, Stereo	
Chennai	102.3 MHz (Vividh Bharathi)	—	20 kW, Stereo	
Coimbatore	103.0 MHz (AIR FM Rainbow)	—	10 kW, Stereo	
Dharmapuri	102.5 MHz (LRS)	—	10 kW	Low Power Relay Station
Karaikal	100.3 MHz	—	—	
Kodaikanal	100.5 MHz (AIR FM Rainbow)	1 July 2000	10 kW, Stereo	
Madurai	103.3 MHz	—	10 kW, Stereo	Main station
Rameshwaram	100.9 MHz	—	20 KW	Relay
Nagercoil	101 MHz (LRS)	—	10 kW	Low Power Relay Station
Ooty	101.8 MHz	—	10 kW	
Kumbakonam	101.60 MHz (Relay)	—	10 kW	
Thanjavur	101.2 MHz (Relay)	—	100 W	
Tiruchirapalli	102.1 MHz (AIR FM Rainbow)	10 January 2001	10 kW, Stereo	
Tirunelveli	102.6 MHz	—	10 kW	
Tirupattur (Vellore)	100.1 MHz (Relay)	—	100 W	
Yercaud (Salem)	103.7 MHz (Dharmapuri FM Rainbow relay)	—	100 W	
Tuticorin (Thoothukudi)	100.1 MHz	—	1 KW	
Rameshwaram	100.1 MHz	—	100 W	Relay
Bangalore	612 kHz	—	—	AM
Bengaluru (Vividha Bharati)	102.9 MHz	—	—	
Bangalore (Rainbow FM)	101.3 MHz	—	—	
Bhadravati	675 kHz	—	—	AM
Dharwad	765 kHz	—	—	AM
Dharwad FM	103.0 MHz	—	—	
Hassan	1107 kHz	—	—	AM
Kalaburagi	1107 kHz	—	—	AM
Mangaluru	1089 kHz	—	—	AM
Mangalore FM	100.3 MHz	—	—	
Madikeri FM	103.1 MHz	—	—	
Sringeri FM	101 MHz	—	—	
Hyderabad	738 kHz	—	—	AM
Hyderabad (FM Rainbow)	101.9 MHz	—	—	
Hyderabad (Vivida Bharati)	102.8 MHz	—	—	
Warangal	103.5 MHz	—	—	
Vijayawada	103.4 MHz	—	—	

== External services ==
The external services of All India Radio are broadcast in 27 languages to countries outside India via high-power shortwave radio transmissions. Mediumwave is also used to reach neighboring countries. In addition to language-specific broadcasts targeted at particular countries, there is a General Overseas Service that broadcasts in English, offering 8¼ hours of programming daily aimed at a general international audience.

The external broadcasts began on 1 October 1939, initiated by the British government to counter Nazi propaganda directed at the Afghan people. Initially, the broadcasts were in Pashto, targeting Afghanistan and the North-West Frontier Province. Over time, broadcasts expanded to include languages such as Dari, Persian, Arabic, English, Burmese, Japanese, Chinese, Malay, and French. Currently, the external services broadcast in 16 foreign languages and 11 Indian languages, with a total program output of 70¼ hours per day on medium and shortwave frequencies.

External service transmitter sites
Location	Number of transmitters	kW	Frequency	DRM !
Aligarh (HPT)	4	250		
Bengaluru (SPT)	6	500		100 kW
Chennai (Madras)	1	100	720 kHz	MW
Gorakhpur	1	50		
Guwahati	1	50		
Jalandhar (Goraya)	1	300	702 kHz	MW
Khampur-Delhi (HPT)	7	250		
Khampur-Delhi (SPT)	2	500		
Kingsway-Delhi	3	50		
Kingsway-Delhi	2	100		
Kolkata-Chinsurah/Mogra (SPT)	1	1000	1134 kHz and 594 kHz (Kolkata – A)	1142 kHz MW
Mumbai (Malad)	1	100		
Nagpur (SPT)	1	1000	1566 kHz	MW
Panaji (HPT)	2	250		
Rajkot (SPT)	1	1000	1071 kHz AIR URDU	1080 kHz (2 MW) Vividha Bharti
Tuticorin	1	200	1053 kHz	MW

Two high-powered FM stations of All India Radio are being installed in Amritsar and Fazilka, Punjab, to complement the programs broadcast from transmitters in Jalandhar, New Delhi, Chandigarh, and Mumbai. These stations aim to improve broadcast services, particularly during unfavorable weather conditions, in the border regions of Punjab.

Today, the External Services Division of All India Radio broadcasts 57 transmissions daily, offering nearly 72 hours of programming that reaches over 108 countries in 27 languages. Of these, 15 are foreign languages and 12 are Indian. The foreign languages include Arabic, Baluchi, Burmese, Chinese, Dari, French, Indonesian, Persian, Pushtu, Russian, Sinhala, Swahili, Thai, Tibetan, and English (General Overseas Service). The Indian languages are Bengali, Gujarati, Marathi, Konkani, Kashmiri, Hindi, Kannada, Malayalam, Nepali, Punjabi, Saraiki, Sindhi, Tamil, Telugu, and Urdu.

The longest daily broadcast is the Urdu Service to Pakistan, which airs around the clock on DTH (direct-broadcast satellite) and on short- and medium-wave for 12¼ hours. The English-language General Overseas Service is broadcast for 8¼ hours daily. During Hajj, special broadcasts in Urdu are beamed to Saudi Arabia. Additionally, AIR is planning to produce programs in the Balochi language.

The external services of All India Radio (AIR) are also broadcast to Europe in DRM (Digital Radio Mondiale) on 9950 kHz between 17:45 and 22:30 UTC. These transmissions are delivered via high-power transmitters located in Aligarh, Bengaluru, Chennai, Delhi, Gorakhpur, Guwahati, Mumbai, and Panaji on shortwave, and from Jalandhar, Kolkata, Nagpur, Rajkot, and Tuticorin on mediumwave. All India Radio Amritsar plans to launch a booster service on the FM band. Some of these transmitters have a power output of 1000 kW (1 MW) or 500 kW. Programs are broadcast to various parts of the world, excluding the Americas, with very good reception quality in the target areas.

Each language service includes news, commentary, press reviews, talks on general or cultural topics, feature programs, documentaries, and music from India and the target region. Most of these programs originate from New Broadcasting House on Parliament Street in New Delhi, with some originating from SPT Bengaluru, Chennai, Hyderabad, Jalandhar, Kolkata, HPT Malad Mumbai, Thiruvananthapuram, and Tuticorin.

The External Services Division of All India Radio (AIR) serves as a vital link between India and the rest of the world, particularly in countries with significant Indian diaspora. It broadcasts India's perspective on national and international matters and showcases the Indian way of life through its programs. QSL cards, which are highly sought after by international radio hobbyists, are issued by AIR in New Delhi in response to reception reports of their broadcasts.

== Direct-To-Home ==
Direct-to-home (DTH) service is a satellite broadcast service where a large number of radio channels are digitally transmitted over a territory from a high-power satellite. All India Radio broadcasts various national and regional stations, which can be accessed on DD Free Dish. The DTH signals can be received directly at homes using a small dish receiver unit, which includes a dish antenna installed on the rooftop or a wall facing clear south, with the receiver placed indoors. DTH service is offered on twenty one channels via Insat.

=== List of DTH channels ===
==== National ====
- Vividh Bharati – Hindi music radio
- AIR FM Rainbow India – Hindi & English music radio
- AIR FM Gold Delhi – Hindi classical music & news Radio
- AIR Live News 24×7 – Hindi & English news radio
- AIR Urdu – Urdu entertainment radio
- AIR Hindi – Hindi entertainment radio
- Raagam – Indian classical music radio
- Gyan Vani – Hindi & English educational radio
- Akashvani Aradhana – Hindi devotional radio

=== Regional ===
- AIR Andhra – Telugu
- AIR Arunachal – Hindi and Nyishi
- AIR Assam – Assamese
- AIR Bihar – Hindi and Bhojpuri
- AIR Chhattisgarh – Hindi and Chhattisgarhi
- AIR Goa – Konkani and Portuguese
- AIR Gujarat – Gujarati
- AIR Haryana – Hindi and Haryanvi
- AIR Himachal – Hindi
- AIR Jammu – Dogri
- AIR Jharkhand – Hindi
- AIR Karnataka – Kannada
- AIR Kerala – Malayalam
- AIR Ladakh – Ladakhi
- AIR Maharashtra – Marathi
- AIR Manipur – Manipuri
- AIR Meghalaya – Khasi, Garo and English
- AIR Mizoram – Mizo
- AIR MP – Hindi
- AIR Nagaland – Nagamese and English
- AIR North East – Hindi and English
- AIR Odisha – Odia
- AIR Port Blair – Hindi
- AIR Puducherry – Tamil and French
- AIR Punjab – Punjabi
- AIR Rajasthan – Hindi and Rajasthani
- AIR Sikkim – Nepali
- AIR Srinagar – Kashmiri and Urdu
- AIR Tamil Nadu – Tamil
- AIR Telangana – Telugu
- AIR Tripura – Bengali and Kokborok
- AIR UP – Hindi
- AIR Uttarakhand – Hindi
- AIR Varanasi – Hindi
- AIR West Bengal – Bengali

== Online services ==
- AIR Live News
- AIR Najibabad
- Vividh Bharati
- FM Gold Delhi
- FM Rainbow Delhi
- AIR Urdu
- Raagam
- AIR Gujarati
- AIR Marathi
- AIR Punjabi
- AIR Malayalam
- AIR Tamil
- AIR Telugu
- AIR Kannada
- AIR Bangla
- AIR Jammu
- AIR Odia
- AIR Assamese
- AIR North East
- FM Tragopan Kohima
- FM Rainbow Goa
- AIR Shimla
- AIR Bhuj
- AIR Indore
- AIR Mysuru
- AIR Jodhpur
- Amrutvarshini
- Vividh Bharati Bengaluru
- FM Rainbow Kannada Kaamaanbilu
- AIR Bengaluru
- Sun City FM Jodhpur
- AIR Pune
- AIR Rohtak
- FM Rainbow Lucknow
- AIR Jabalpur
- AIR Bhopal
- FM Rainbow Mumbai
- FM Gold Mumbai
- Samvadita Mumbai
- AIR Aadilabad
- AIR Jaipur
- AIR Varanasi
- AIR Raipur
- AIR Sangli
- AIR Rajkot
- AIR Nagpur
- AIR Prayagraj
- AIR Patna
- AIR Patiala
- AIR Mhadei Panaji
- AIR Gorakhpur
- AIR Hassan
- AIR Dehradun
- AIR Solapur
- AIR Kota
- AIR Madurai
- AIR Kolhapur
- AIR Suratgarh
- FM Rainbow Visakhapatnam
- AIR Kurnool
- AIR Bikaner
- AIR Kochi
- AIR Calicut
- AIR Mathura
- AIR Agra
- FM Rainbow Vijayawada
- AIR Vijayawada
- AIR Kannur
- FM Ananthapuri
- AIR Lucknow
- AIR Mount Abu
- AIR Dharwad
- AIR Chandigarh
- AIR Chitradurga
- AIR Manjeri
- AIR Aurangabad
- AIR Surat
- AIR Tirupati
- AIR Kodaikanal
- AIR Alwar

== Other services ==
=== Digital Radio Mondiale ===
Details of the Digital Radio Mondiale (DRM) transmissions and frequencies are as follows:

- 01:30–02:30 UTC on 11715 kHz Nepali (Nepal)
- 03:15–04:15 UTC on 15185 kHz Hindi (East Africa, Mauritius)
- 04:15–04:30 UTC on 15185 kHz Gujarati (East Africa, Mauritius)
- 04:30–05:30 UTC on 15185 kHz Hindi (East Africa, Mauritius)
- 13:00–15:00 UTC on 15050 kHz Sinhala (Sri Lanka)
- 16:15–17:15 UTC on 15140 kHz Russian (Eastern Europe)
- 22:45–00:45 UTC on 11645 GOS-I English (Northeast Asia)
- 09:00–11:00 UTC on 6100 kHz Vividh Bharati, DRM NVIS
- 17:45–20:05 UTC on 9950 kHz English (Western Europe)
- 19:45–20:45 UTC on 9950 kHz Hindi (Western Europe)
- 20:45–02:30 UTC on 9950 kHz English (Western Europe)

=== News-on-phone ===
All India Radio launched its news-on-phone service on 25 February 1998, in New Delhi. The service is now available in Chennai, Mumbai, Hyderabad, Indore, Patna, and Bangalore. It can be accessed through subscriber trunk dialing (STD), international direct dialing (ISD), and local calls. Plans are in place to expand the service to 11 additional cities, including Ahmedabad, Bhopal, Guwahati, Gwalior, Jabalpur, Jaipur, Kolkata, Lucknow, Ranchi, and Shimla. The service allows users to listen to live hourly news bulletins in English and Hindi. News in MP3 format can be directly played from the site, with filenames time-stamped for easy reference. All India Radio's news bulletins are available in nine regional languages: Tamil, Kannada, Gujarati, Bengali, Marathi, North East languages, Punjabi, Telugu, and Urdu.

=== Documentaries ===
All India Radio (AIR) has a long tradition of broadcasting documentary features, which have garnered significant interest, particularly in countries like India, Iran, South Korea, and Malaysia. The most prominent broadcaster of English features was Melville de Mellow, while Shiv Sagar Mishra was renowned for his Hindi features. This format has been revived by AIR producers across India due to its flexibility, relatively low production cost, messaging potential, and creative possibilities.

=== Central Drama Unit ===
All India Radio's Central Drama Unit (CDU) is responsible for the national broadcast of plays. The plays produced by the CDU are translated and produced by regional stations. Since its inception in the 1960s, the unit has produced over 1,500 plays and maintains a repository of old scripts and productions. The National Programme of Plays, aired by the CDU, is broadcast on the fourth Thursday of each month at 9:30 pm. Each play in this program is produced in 22 Indian languages and broadcast simultaneously by all regional and national network stations. Additionally, the CDU produces Chain Plays, which are half-hour dramas broadcast in succession by a network of stations.

=== Social Media Cell ===
The News Service Division's Social Media Cell was established on 20 May 2013, and is responsible for delivering AIR news across new media platforms, including websites, Twitter, Facebook, and SMS.

== Gallery ==
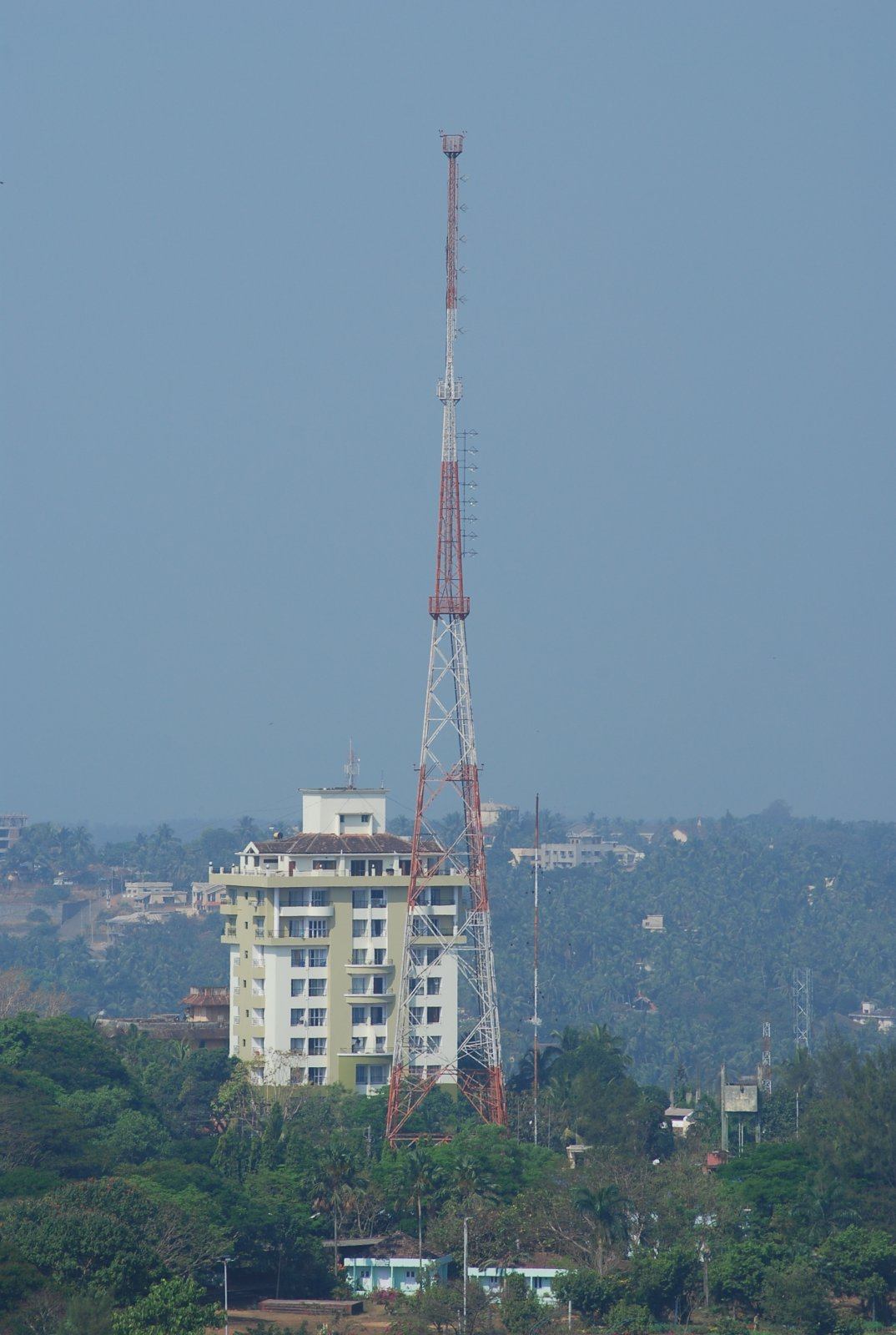
AIR tower in Mangalore, Karnataka

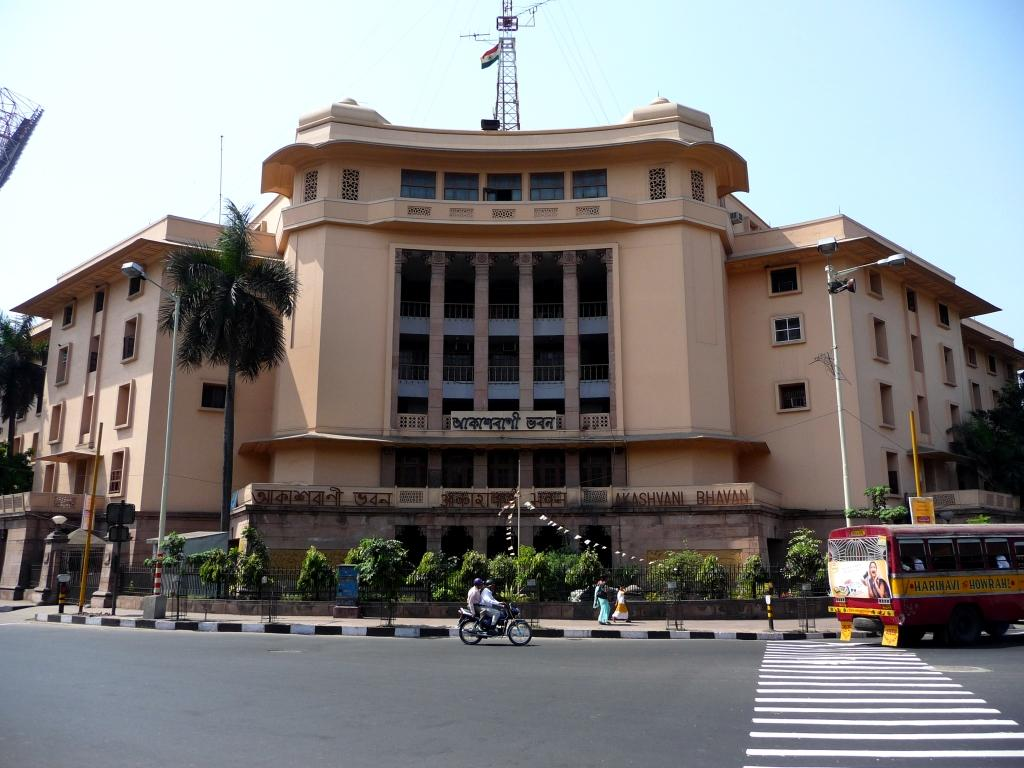
Akashvani Kolkata: the regional centre of Akashvani, West Bengal.

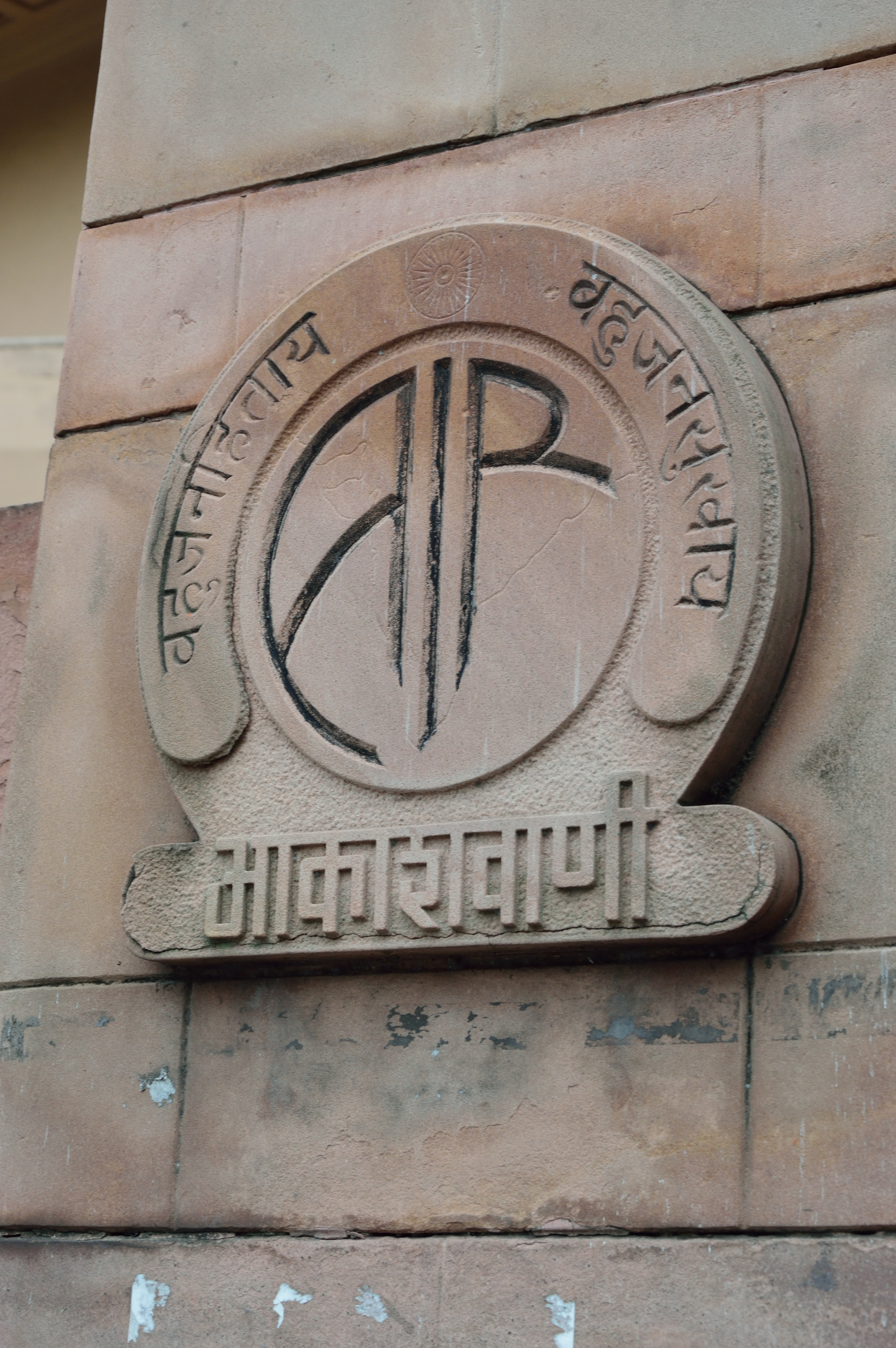
Emblem of Akashvani at Akashvani Kolkata

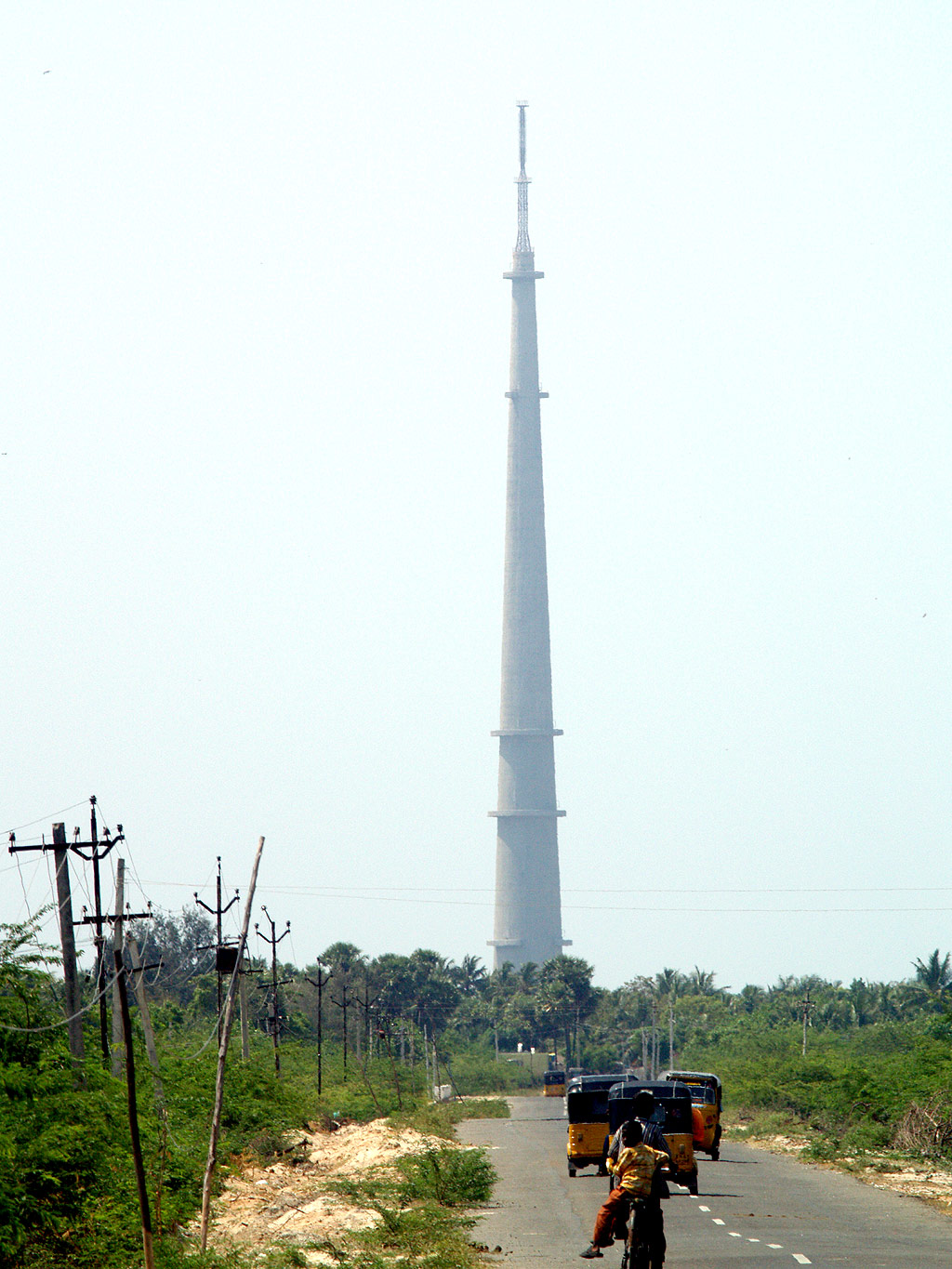
Doordarshan TV Tower repurposed as All India Radio tower in Rameshwaram

== See also ==
- The Indian Listener
- Radio in India
- 106.4 FM Radio Gold
- Telugu Radio
- AIR Srinagar
- Telecommunications in India
