= Heritage buildings of Department of Posts =

India Post, one of the oldest government institutions in India, is known not only for its postal network but also for the heritage buildings from which it operates. Many of these buildings were constructed during the British Raj and have significant architectural and historical value.

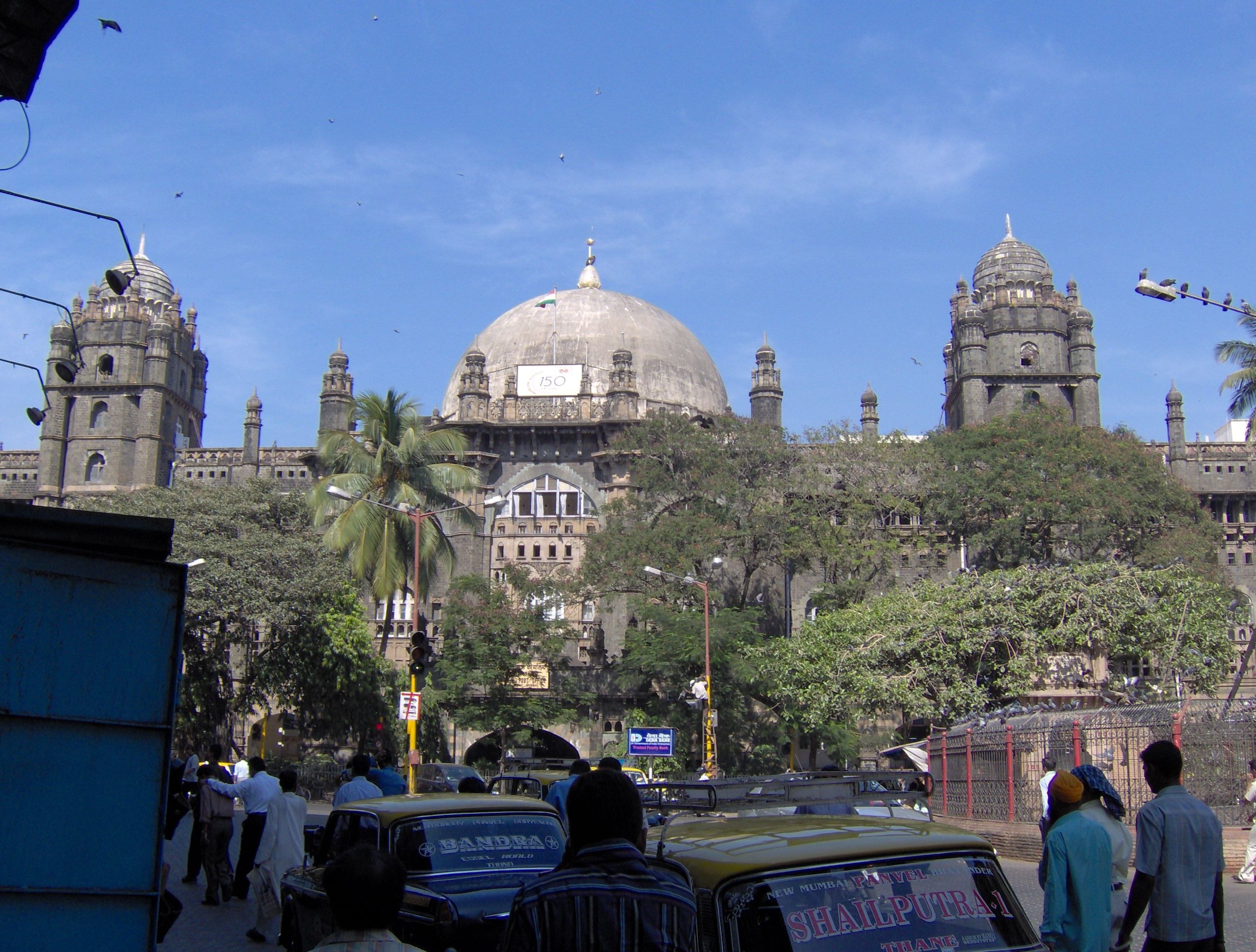
The Mumbai GPO, with its restored dome, is an architectural marvel in the city.

== Mumbai General Post Office ==
The Mumbai General Post Office (GPO) was designed by British architect John Begg. It was completed in 1913 and stands as a notable example of Indo-Saracenic architecture. The dome of this building, inspired by the Gol Gumbaz of Bijapur, is the second-largest dome in India. Extensive restoration work has been underway since 2021, with plans to preserve its heritage while making the building more sustainable.

== Kolkata General Post Office ==
Another significant heritage building is the Kolkata General Post Office. Constructed in 1864, it employs classic colonial architecture and serves as a key landmark in the city. Restoration efforts are currently being made to preserve its historical significance.

== Restoration efforts ==
In collaboration with the Indian National Trust for Art and Cultural Heritage (INTACH), the Department of Posts has initiated several restoration projects to preserve these heritage structures and convert them into tourist attractions. The aim is to maintain the architectural integrity of the buildings while integrating modern technology, such as solar energy.
