= Saeeda Bano =

Indian broadcaster (1920–2001)

Saeeda Bano (Urdu: سعیدہ بانو) (1920–2001) was an Indian news broadcaster who joined All India Radio in 1947 and subsequently became the first professional female news broadcaster in India, reading the news in Urdu. She also published a memoir titled Dagar Se Hat Kar (Off the Beaten Track) in 1994.

== Life ==
Bano spent her early childhood in Lucknow, Uttar Pradesh and Bhopal, Madhya Pradesh. At 17 she married Abbas Raza, a judge, but separated from him in 1947, moving with her children to Delhi to work as a news broadcaster. She was a friend of the singer and actress Begum Akhtar, and helped introduce her to society in Lucknow, including introducing Akhtar to her future husband, Ishtiaq Abbasi. After her separation from her husband, Bano entered into a long-term relationship with lawyer Nuruddin Ahmed, who later served as the mayor of India's capital, Delhi.

== Career ==
Following her separation from her husband, Bano applied for, and was accepted, to a job at the All India Radio, to read the news in Urdu. Prior to that, she had worked in a private radio station set up in Lucknow, which broadcast shows for women and children. She had written directly to diplomat and politician Vijay Lakshmi Pandit, who supported her application. Bano was the first woman to read the news as a public broadcaster in India. Bano has also described facing criticism for living alone as a single woman, and working professionally as a news broadcaster, during this period. She began her work on 13 August 1947, two days before India's independence day, marking the end of British colonial rule in India. In her memoir, Bano describes receiving letters from Indian audiences telling her to 'Go to Pakistan' following the partition of India and notes that while the amount of such letters reduced, she continued to receive them over the course of her career.

In 1994, Bano published a memoir in Urdu titled, Dagar Se Hat Kar, which was later translated to English as Off the Beaten Track by her granddaughter Shahana Raza. Bano has stated that she wrote the memoir at the encouragement of her friend, author and musician Sheila Dhar. The book won an award from the Urdu Academy in Delhi.
