= The Indian Listener =

Listings magazine

- First issue: December 1935
- Country: India
- Language: English

The Indian Listener was a listings magazine, first published in December 1935 by the Indian State Broadcasting Service. It was the successor to the Indian Radio Times, and became Akashvani in January 1958.
