= India Post =

Statutory Body of India

- Official logo of India Post

Department overview
- Formed: 1 October 1854; 171 years ago
- Jurisdiction: Government of India
- Headquarters: Dak Bhawan, Sansad Marg, New Delhi, India
- Employees: 4,57,997 (2024)
- Annual budget: ₹25,378.47 crore (US$2.6 billion) (2024–25)
- Ministers responsible: Jyotiraditya Scindia, (Minister of Communications); Chandra Sekhar Pemmasani, (Minister of State for Communications)
- Department executives: Mr.Subrat Das, IPoS, Secretary, Department of Posts; Shri Jitendra Gupta, IPoS, Director General of Postal Services
- Parent Department: Ministry of Communications, Government of India
- Child Department: India Post Payments Bank
- Key documents: The Indian Post Office Act, 1898; The Post Office Act, 2023
- Website: www.indiapost.gov.in

The Department of Posts, d/b/a India Post, is an Indian public sector postal system statutory body headquartered in New Delhi, India. It is an organisation under the Ministry of Communications. It is the most widely distributed postal system in the world and India is the country that has the largest number of post offices in the world with 164,999 post offices including 149,385 rural post offices and 15,614 urban post offices. It is involved in delivering mail (post), remitting money by money orders, accepting deposits under Small Savings Schemes, providing life insurance coverage under Postal Life Insurance (PLI) and Rural Postal Life Insurance (RPLI) and providing retail services like bill collection, sale of forms, etc.

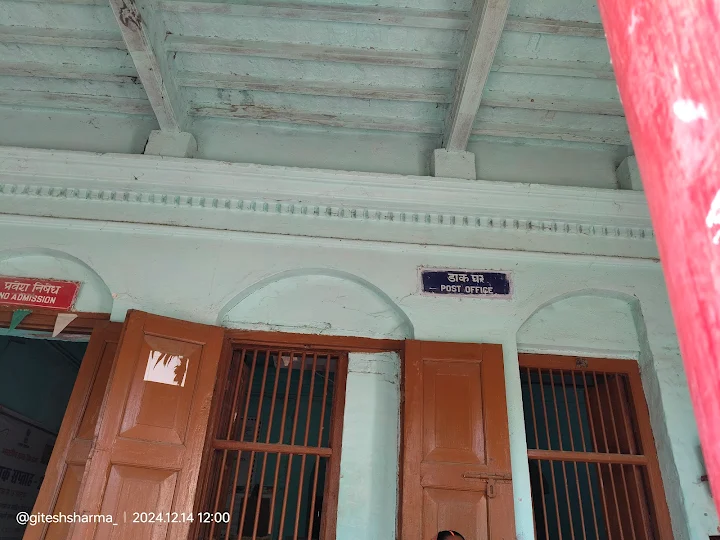
Sub-Post Office, Mahuwal, Bihar, India - 841240

Apart from delivering services to general public and corporates, India Post is also proud custodian of a rich heritage of postal buildings that echo the historical evolution and architectural grandeur of bygone eras. India Post has declared 44 heritage buildings so far.

Warren Hastings had taken initiative under East India Company to start the Postal Service in the country in 1766. It was initially established under the name "Company Mail". It was later modified into a service under the Crown in 1854 by Lord Dalhousie. Dalhousie introduced uniform postage rates (universal service) and helped to pass the India Post Office Act 1854 which significantly improved upon 1837 Post Office act which had introduced regular post offices in India. It created the position Director General of Post for the whole country. The DoP also acts as an agent for the Indian government in discharging other services for citizens such as old age pension payments and Mahatma Gandhi National Rural Employment Guarantee Scheme (MGNREGS) wage disbursement. With 164,999 post offices (as of March 2025), India Post is the widest postal network in the world.

The country has been divided into 23 postal circles, each circle headed by a Chief Postmaster General. Each circle is divided into regions, headed by a Postmaster General and comprising field units known as Divisions. These divisions are further divided into subdivisions. In addition to the 23 circles, there is a base circle to provide postal services to the Armed Forces of India headed by a Director General. One of the highest post offices in the world is in Hikkim, At 4,400m above sea level in northern India's remote Spiti Valley, the Hikkim post office is a vital connection to the outside world.

== History ==
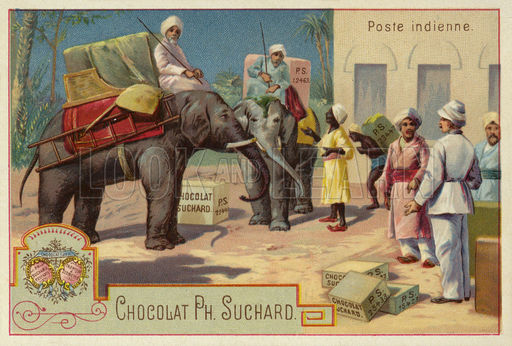
Indian postal service Educational card, late 19th or early 20th century

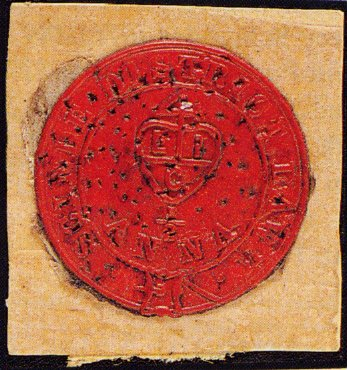
1850s Scinde Dawk stamp

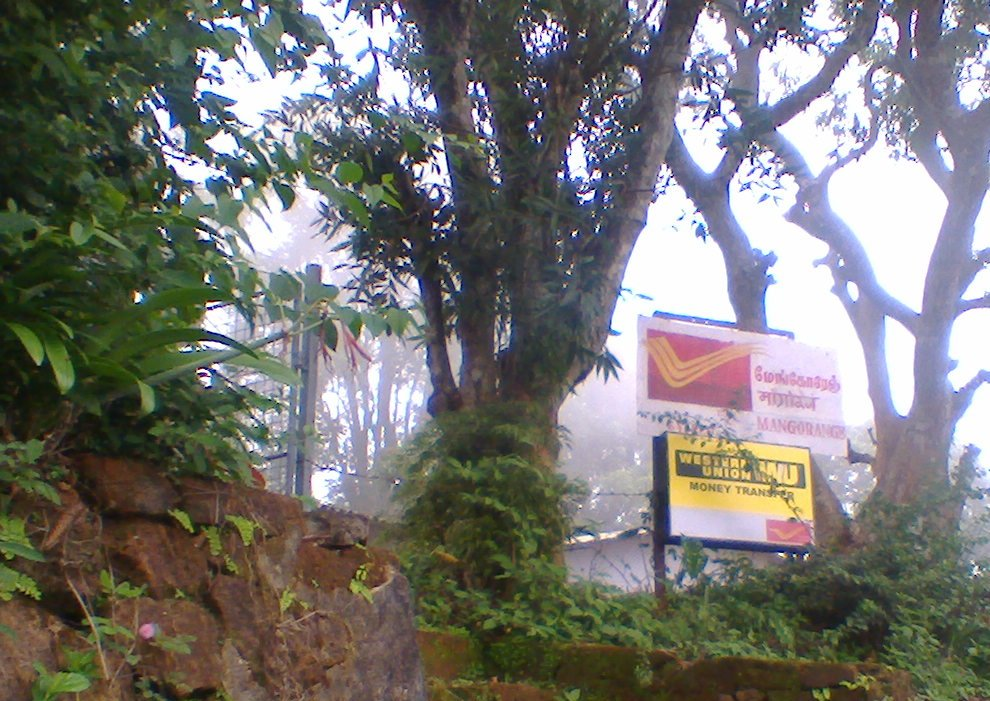
A modern Indian post office near Udagamandalam

=== Posts and the British Raj (1858–1947) ===
The British Raj was instituted in 1858, when the rule of the East India Company was transferred to the Crown.

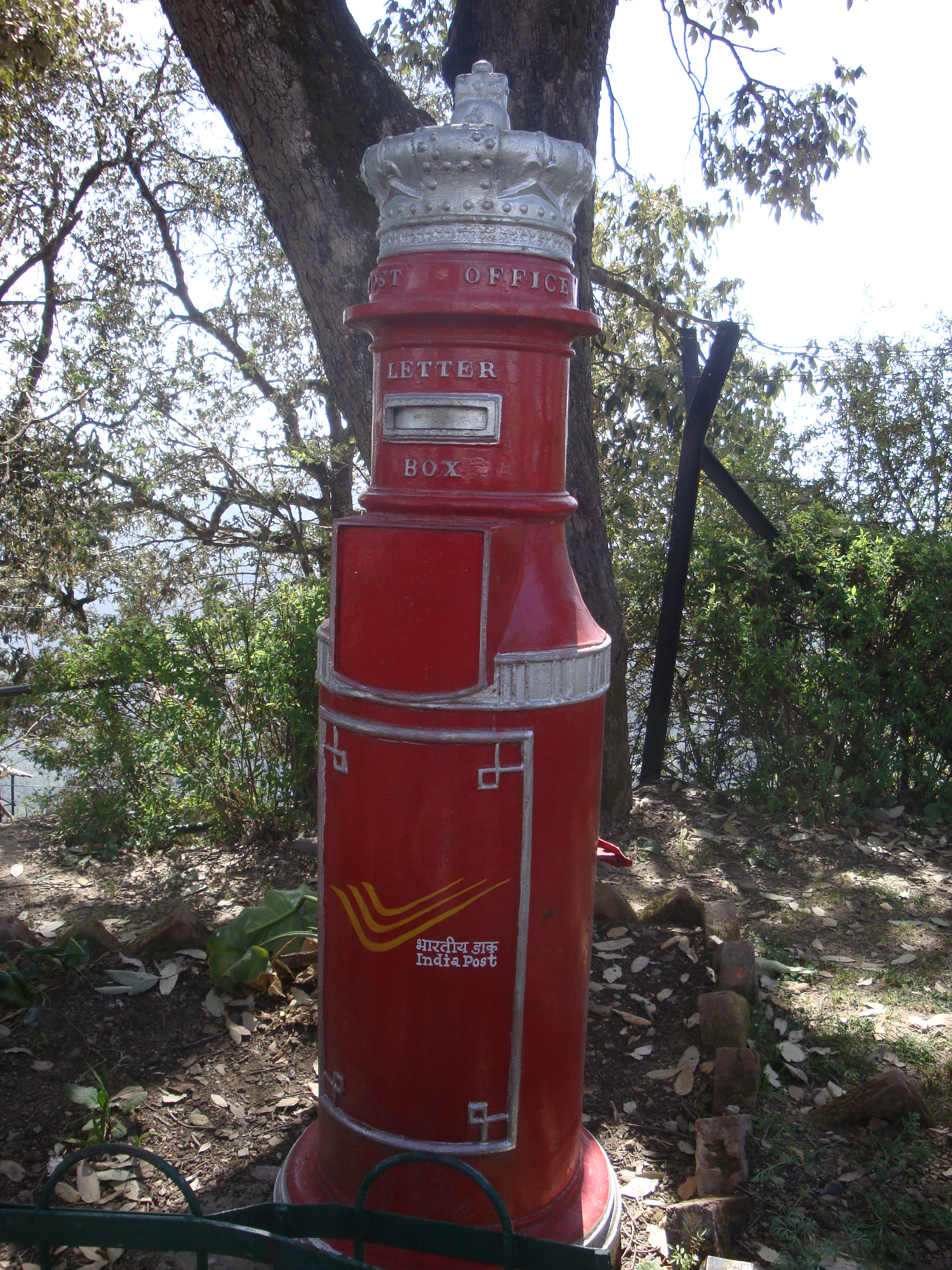
British-era letter box in Shimla, India.

A number of acts were enacted during the British Raj to expand and regulate posts and telegraphs service:

- The Government Savings Bank Act, 1873 (5 of 1873), passed by the legislature 28 January 1873, was enacted in 1881. On 1 April 1882, Post Office Savings Banks opened throughout India (except in the Bombay Presidency). In Madras Presidency, it was limited; in the Bengal Presidency, no POSBs were established in Calcutta or Howrah.
- Postal life insurance began on 1 February 1884 as a welfare measure for the employees of the Posts & Telegraphs Department as Government of India dispatch No. 299 dated 18 October 1882 to the Secretary of State.
- The Indian Telegraph Act, 1885
- The Indian Post Office Act, 1898, passed by the legislature on 22 March 1898, became effective on 1 July 1898 regulating postal service. It was preceded by Act III of 1882 and Act XVI of 1896.
- The Indian Wireless Telegraphy Act, 1933

The world's first official airmail flight took place in India on 18 February 1911, a journey of 18 kilometres (11 mi) lasting 27 minutes. Henri Pequet, a French pilot, carried about 15 kilograms (33 lb) of mail (approximately 6,000 letters and cards) across the Ganges from Allahabad to Naini; included in the airmail was a letter to King George V of the United Kingdom. India Post inaugurated a floating post office in August 2011 at Dal Lake in Srinagar, Kashmir. Telegraphy and telephony made their appearance as part of the postal service before becoming separate departments. One unique telegraph office was established and operated in the capital of Lhasa until the People's Republic of China's annexation of Tibet. The Posts and Telegraphs departments merged in 1914, later separated again on 1 January 1985.

=== After independence in 1947 ===
Since India became independent in 1947, the postal service continues to function on a nationwide basis, providing a variety of services. The structure of the organization has the directorate at its apex; below it are circle offices, regional offices, the superintendent's offices, head post offices, sub-post offices and branch offices. In April 1959, the Indian Postal Department adopted the motto "Service before help"; it revised its logo in September 2008.

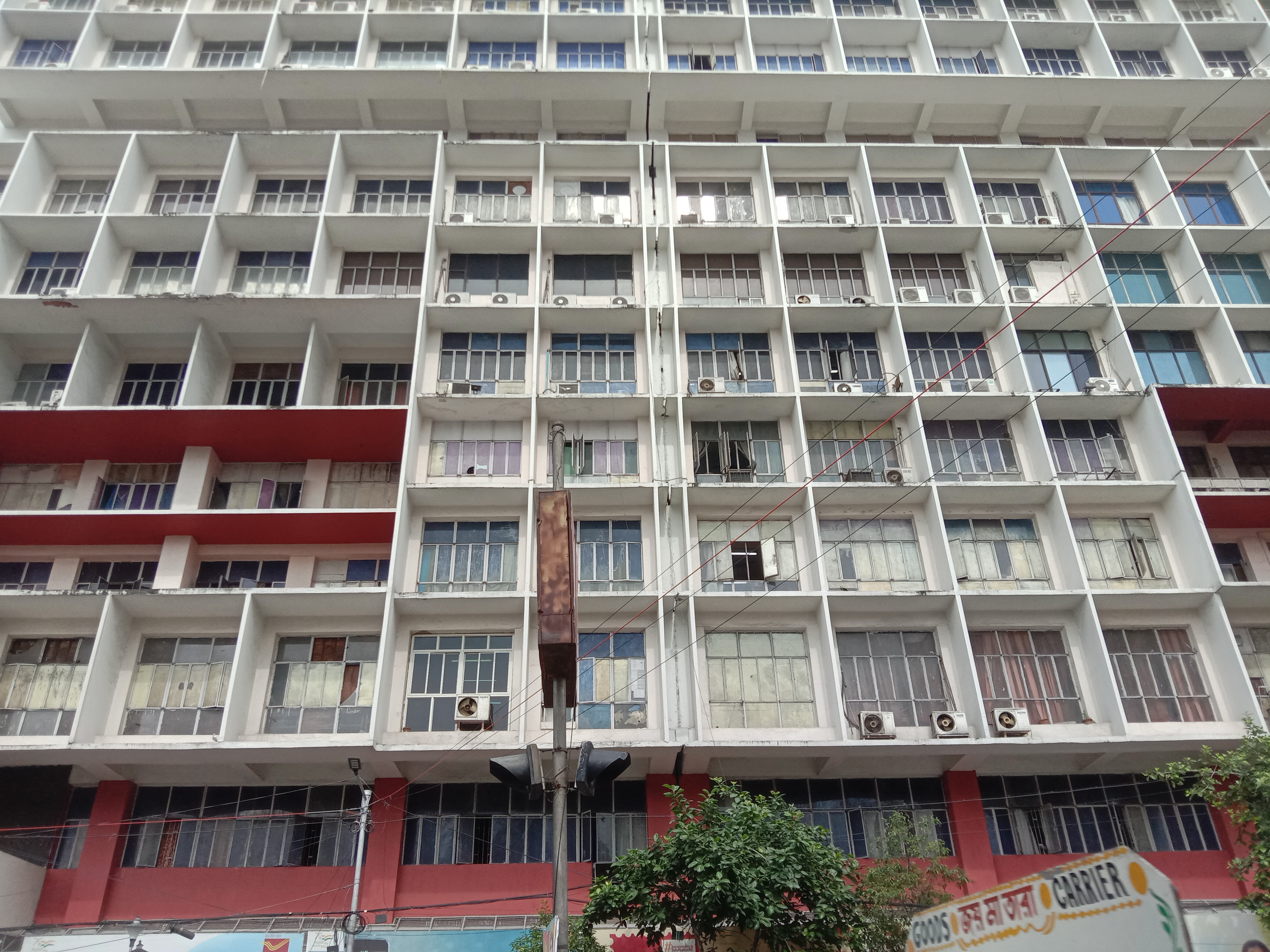
Yogayog Bhawan (head office of the West Bengal wing of India Post), at Chittaranjan Avenue, Bowbazar, Kolkata.

The number of post offices was 23,344 when India became independent in 1947 and these were primarily in urban areas. The number increased to 1,64,987 in 2025 and 90% of these are in rural areas.

== Postage-stamp history ==
=== First adhesive stamps in Asia ===
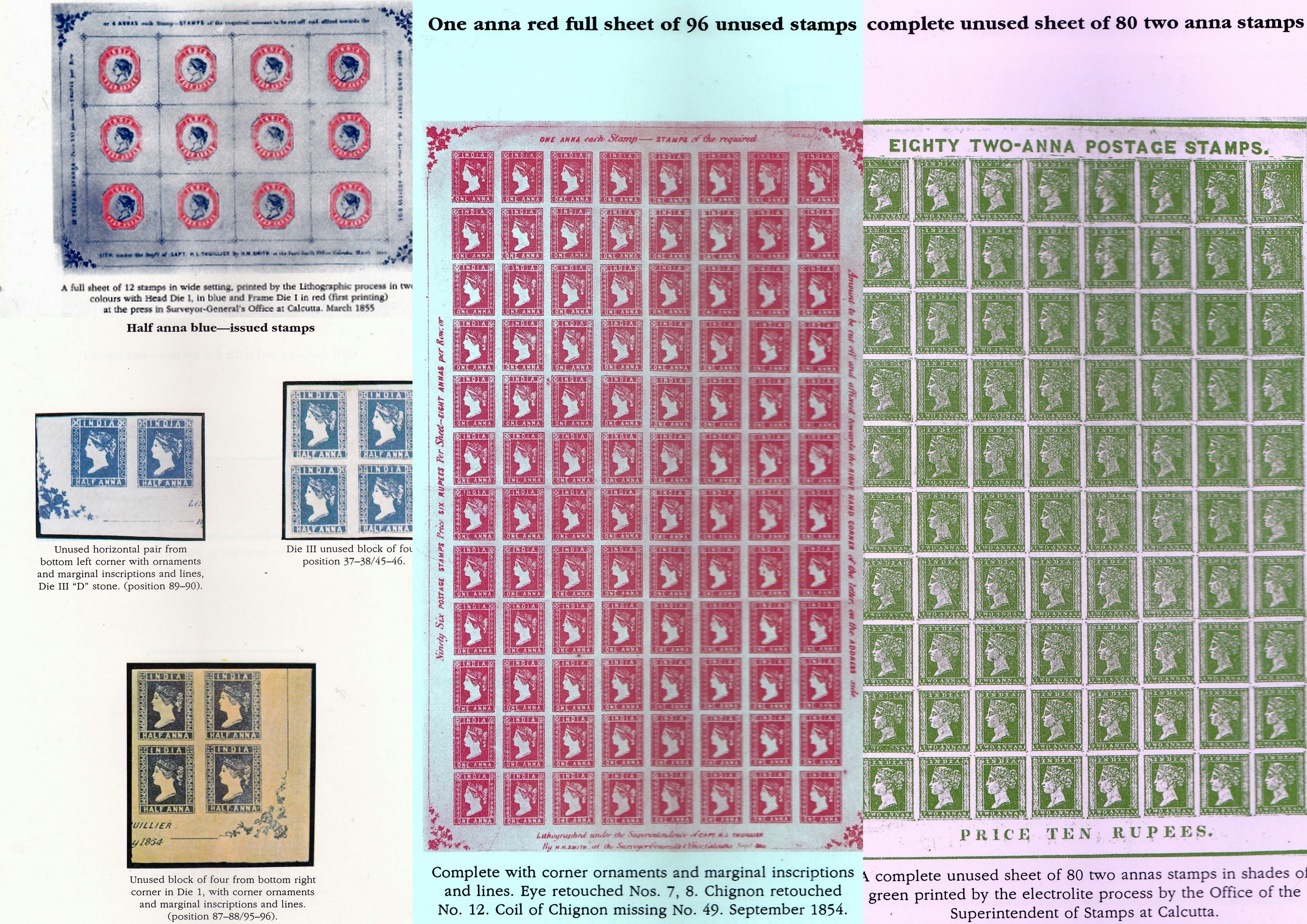
First all-India stamps

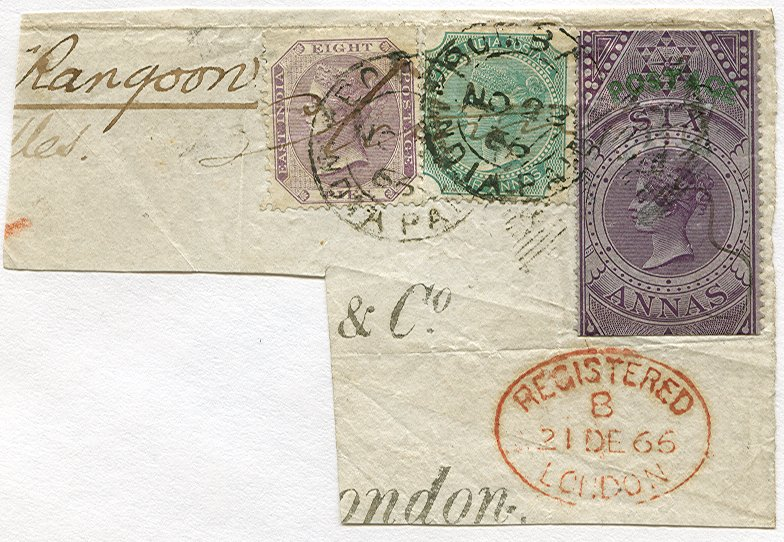
Six-anna provisional stamp, 1866

The first adhesive postage stamps in Asia were issued in the Indian district of Scinde in July 1852 by Bartle Frere, chief commissioner of the region. Frere was an admirer of Rowland Hill, the English postal reformer who had introduced the Penny Post. The Scinde stamps became known as "Scinde Dawks"; "Dawk" is the Anglicised spelling of the Hindustani word Dak or ("post"). These stamps, with a value of 1/2-anna, were in use until June 1866. The first all-India stamps were issued on 1 October 1854.

=== Stamps issued by the East India Company ===
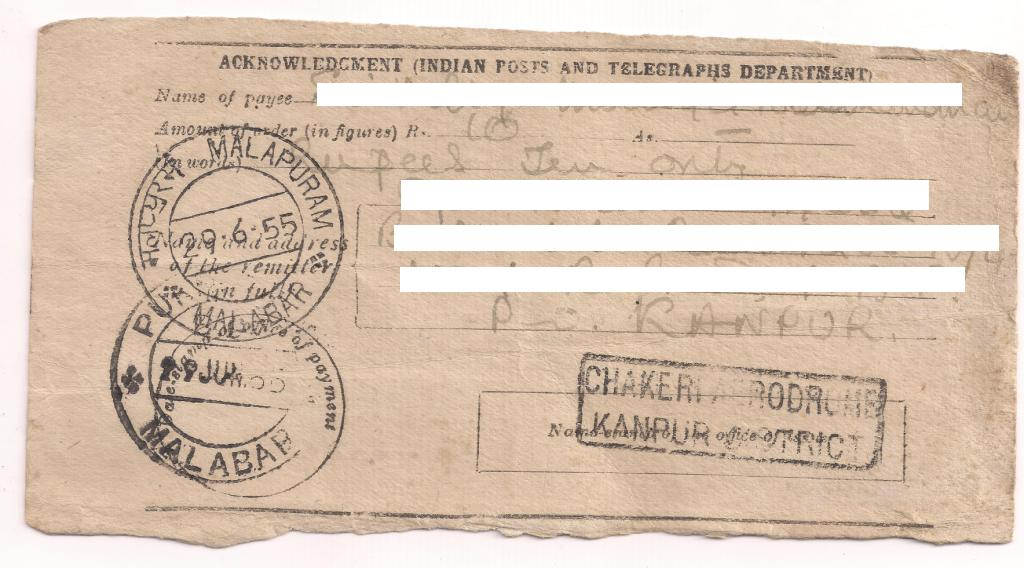
1955 money order (front)

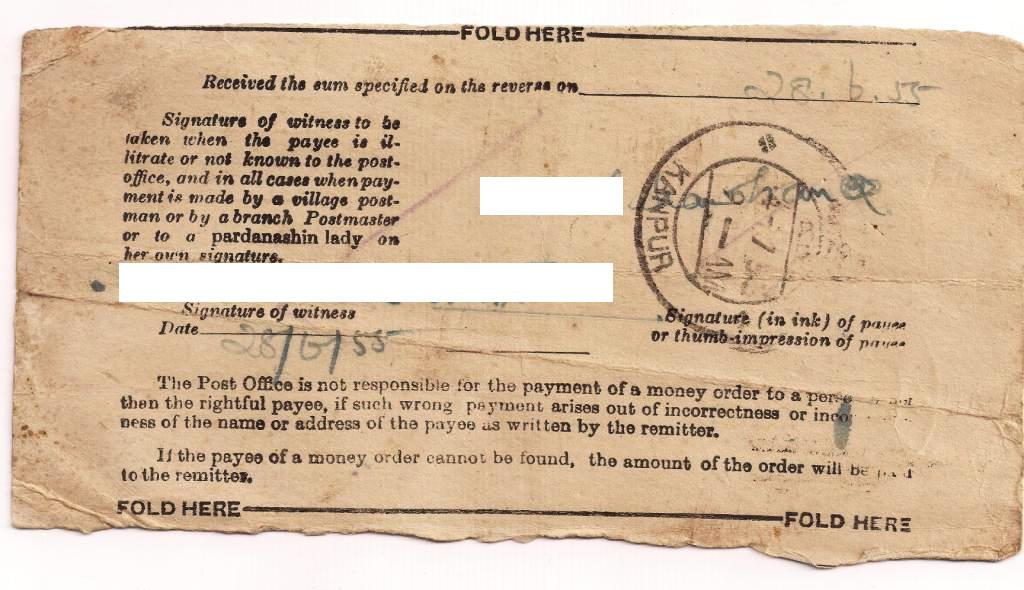
1955 money order (back)

The volume of mail moved by the postal system increased significantly, doubling between 1854 and 1866 and doubling again by 1871. The Indian Post Office Act, 1866 (XIV) introduced reforms by 1 May 1866 to correct some of the more obvious postal-system deficiencies and abuses. Postal-service efficiencies were also introduced. In 1863, lower rates were set for "steamer" mail to Europe at (six annas, eight pies for a 1/2-ounce letter). Lower rates were also introduced for inland mail.

New regulations removed special postal privileges enjoyed by officials of the East India Company. Stamps for official use were prepared and carefully accounted for, to combat abuses by officials. In 1854 Spain had printed special stamps for official communications, but in 1866 India was the first country to adopt the expedient of overprinting "Service" on postage stamps and "Service Postage" on revenue stamps. This innovation was later widely adopted by other countries.

Shortages developed, so stamps also had to be improvised. Some "Service Postage" overprinted rarities resulted from abrupt changes in postal regulations. New designs for the four-anna and six-anna-eight-pie stamps were issued in 1866. Nevertheless, there was a shortage of stamps to meet the new rates. Provisional six-anna stamps were improvised by cutting the top and bottom from a current foreign-bill revenue stamp and overprinting "Postage". India was the first country in the Commonwealth to issue airmail stamps.

=== Post-independence stamps ===
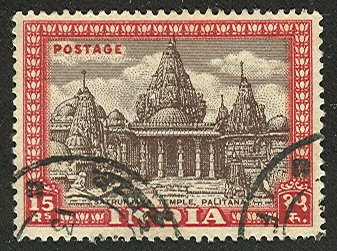
Brown-and-pink stamp depicting a temple

India attained independence on 15 August 1947. Thereafter, the Indian Posts and Telegraph Department embarked on a broad-based policy for the issuance of stamps. On 21 November 1947 the first new stamp was issued by independent India. It depicts the Indian flag with the patriots' slogan, Jai Hind ("long live India"), at the top right-hand corner. The stamp was valued at three and one-half annas. A memorial to Mahatma Gandhi was issued 15 August 1948 on the first anniversary of independence. One year later a definitive series appeared, depicting India's broad cultural heritage (primarily Hindu, Buddhist, Muslim, Sikh and Jain temples, sculptures, monuments and fortresses). A subsequent issue commemorated the beginning of the Republic of India on 26 January 1950. Definitives included a technology-and-development theme in 1955, a series depicting a map of India in 1957 (denominated in naya paisa—decimal currency) and a 1965 series with a wide variety of images. The old inscription "India Postage" was replaced in 1962 with "भारत INDIA", although three stamps (issued from December 1962 to January 1963) carried the earlier inscription.

India has printed stamps and postal stationery for other countries, mostly neighbours. Countries which have had stamps printed in India include Burma (before independence), Nepal, Bangladesh, Bhutan, Portugal and Ethiopia. The country has issued definitive and commemorative stamps. Six definitive series on India's heritage and progress in a number of fields have been issued. The seventh series, with a theme of science and technology, began in 1986. Between independence and 1983, 770 stamps were issued.

== Losses ==
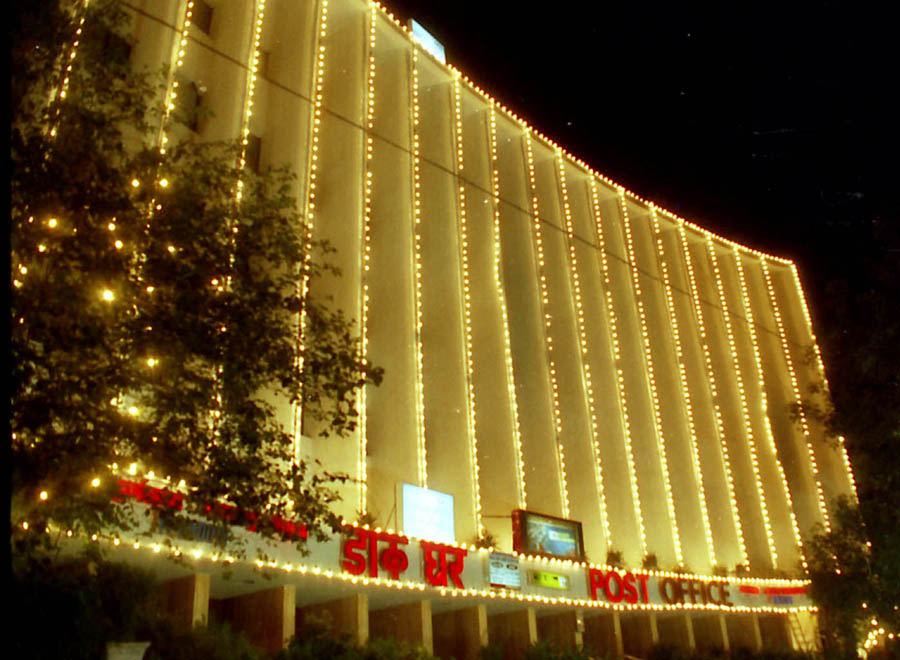
A still of illuminated Dak Bhavan (the Headquarters of Department of Posts) at Parliament Street, during the celebrations marking the entry of Department of Posts into 150 years of service to the nation (on 1 October 2004)

The postal department has always been the biggest loss-making entity in India, surpassing others like the Air India and BSNL, with an annual loss to the exchequer to the tune of ₹15,000 crore in the fiscal year 2019, and amounting to ₹15,541 crore in the calendar year 2020. The following table shows losses incurred by the postal department over the years.

Year	Net expenditure (in crores)	Revenue (in crores)	Loss (in crores)
2010–11	₹13,075.0	₹6,962.3	₹6,113
2011–12	₹12,075.3	₹7,899.4	₹4,175.9
2012–13	₹14,676.4	₹9,366.498	₹5,309.9
2013–14	₹16,203.52	₹10,730.42	₹5,473.10
2014–15	₹17,894.58	₹11,635.98	₹6,258.60
2015–16	₹18,946.97	₹12,939.79	₹6,007.18
2016–17	₹23,480.95	₹11,511.00	₹11,969.95
2017–18	₹27,977.60	₹13,084.76	₹14,892.84
2018–19	₹27,129.08	₹13,482.56	₹13,646.52
2019–20	₹28,371.34	₹13,558.2	₹14,813.14
2020–21	₹28,327.59	₹10,632.50	₹17,695.09
2021–22	₹29,721.43	₹10,860.80	₹18,860.63
2022–23	₹31456.33	₹10,917.89	₹20,538.44
2023–24	₹34,389.64	₹11,321.35	₹23,068.29
2024–25	₹36,340.45	₹11,425.24	₹24,915.20

== PIN ==
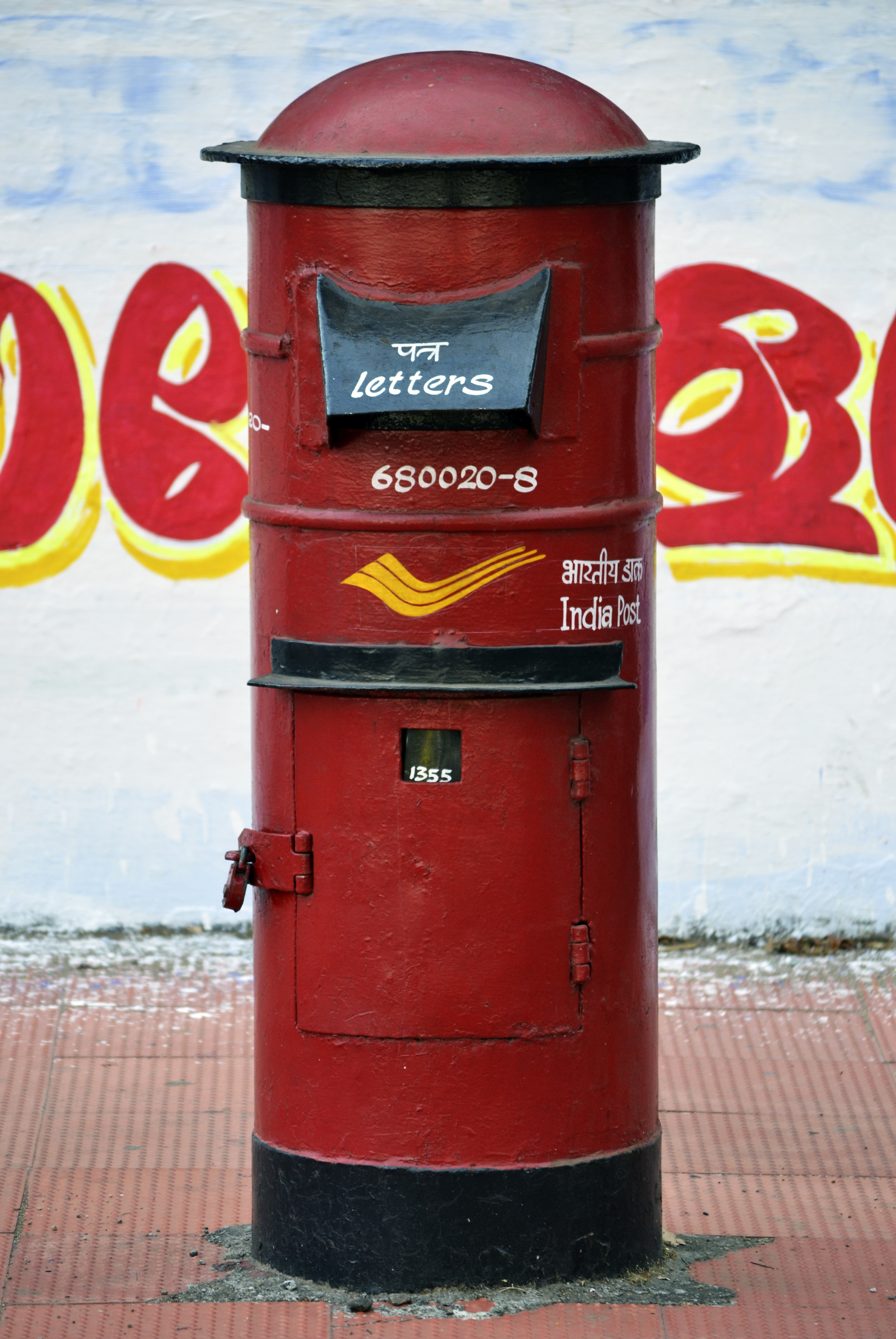
A Post Box of India Post

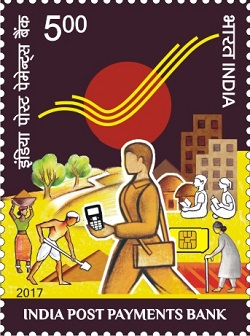
A special stamp released on India Post Payments Bank in 2017.

The Postal Index Number (PIN, or sometimes redundantly PIN code) is a six-digit postal code. The PIN system was made by Shriram Bhikaji Velankar when he was at service in Kolkata. It was introduced on 15 August 1972 by former Prime Minister Indira Gandhi. There are nine postal zones in the country; the first eight are geographical regions, and the ninth is reserved for the Army Postal Service (APS905898).

The PIN system is organised in the following way:

- The first digit indicates the zone.
- The first two digits indicate the sub-zone (or postal circle).
- The first three digits indicate a sorting district.
- The first four digits indicate a service route.
- The last two digits indicate the delivery post office.

The PIN for an address may be found on the Postal Service website. There are total of 19,101 PINs covering 164,999 post offices in India, with the exception of the Army Postal Service, as of 2025.

== Digital Address Code ==
Indian Post proposed a 10 digit unique identification number to each and every address in India based on geo coordinates called DIGIPIN. Digital Address Code (DAC) will be assigned to all types of addresses in the country ranging from independent houses, individual building, every flat in the given apartment, every shop in a commercial building and every individual unit in an office complex. Draft approach paper on Digital Address Code was issued by Indian Post for public comments.

== Project Arrow ==
Project Arrow was launched in April 2008. The project plans to upgrade post offices in urban and rural areas, improving service and appearance into a vibrant and responsive organization and to make a visible and positive difference. The project aims to create an effective, friendly environment for staff and customers, providing secure IT services and improving mail delivery, remittances (electronic and manual) and postal-savings plans. Core areas for improvement are branding, information technology, human resources and infrastructure. The project to improve service has been implemented in more than 23,500 post offices, and 'look and feel' improvements have been made in 2,940 post offices. The Department of Posts received the Prime Minister’s Awards for Excellence in Public Administration during 2008–09 for "Project Arrow – Transforming India Post" on 21 April 2010.

Multipurpose counter machines with computers were introduced in post offices in 1991 to improve customer service and increase staff productivity. 25,000 departmental post offices out of 25,464 were computerized between as of 2011–2012. In 2012, a plan costing ₹1,877.2 crore (equivalent to ₹35 billion or US$370 million in 2023) was formulated to computerize rural post offices.

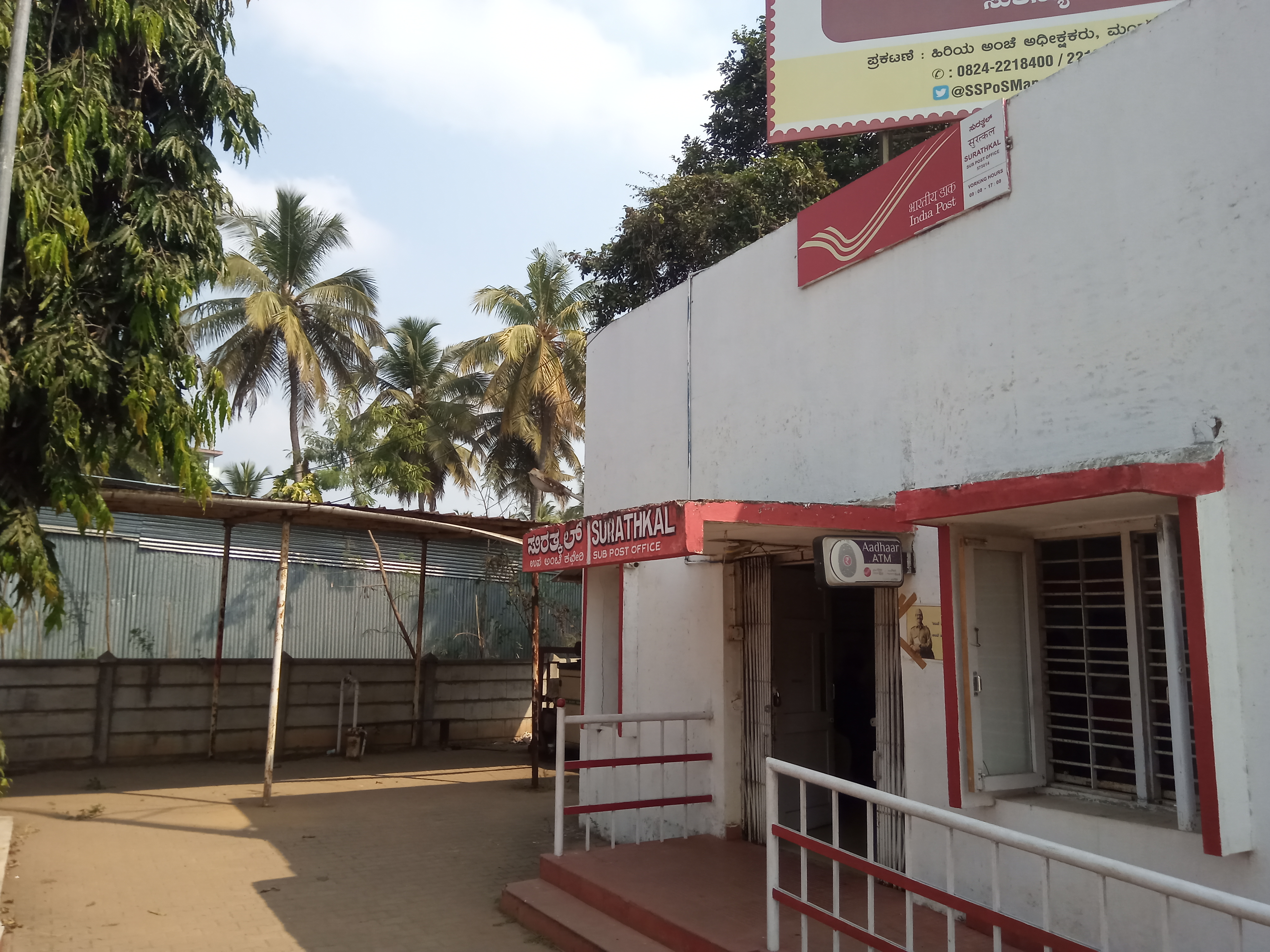
The Surathkal Post Office in Surathkal, India

== Services ==
=== Philately ===
The first philatelic Society in India was founded in Calcutta on 6 March 1897 to service postage-stamp collections. Function include design, printing and distribution of special or commemorative postage stamps, definitive postage stamps and items of postal stationery, promotion of philately, conduct of philatelic examinations at the national level, participation in international exhibitions and monitoring exhibitions at the state, regional and district levels and maintenance of the National Philatelic Museum. Philatelic bureaus were established in head post offices located at circle headquarters and at district-capital head post offices (as necessary). There are 68 philately bureaus and 1111 philatelic counters, including all head post offices (Mukhya Dak Ghars) in the country as of 31 March 2011. A domestic philatelic deposit-account system was introduced on 1 August 1965 at all philatelic bureaus. Customers are given priority in purchasing commemorative or special-issue stamps, first-day covers and information sheets soon after their issue by opening a deposit account at any philatelic bureau. The number of philately deposit-accountholders grew from 23,905 in 1999–2000 to 168,282 in 2006–2007 and 183,202 in 2008–2009. Four philatelic bureaux—the Bombay, Madras, Calcutta and Parliament Street, New Delhi GPOs are authorized to sell United Nations stamps. A quarterly philatelic magazine, Philapost, was launched in 2008.

The Department of Post has also developed software for philatelic inventory management, known as "Philsim". It is used for all activities relating to philately, including forecasting, indenting, invoicing, monitoring supply and demand and recording sales and revenue for commemorative stamps and other philatelic products at philately bureaus and counters (and definitive stamps and stationery at circle stamp depots and head post offices).

The National Philatelic Museum was inaugurated on 6 July 1968 in New Delhi. It had its beginnings at a meeting of the Philatelic Advisory Committee on 18 September 1962. Besides a large collection of India Postage stamps designed, printed and issued, it has a large collection of Indian states (confederate and feudatory), early essays, proofs and colour trials, a collection of Indian stamps used abroad, early Indian postcards, postal stationery and thematic collections. The museum was renovated in 2009 with more exhibits, a philatelic bureau and postal objects (such as Victorian post boxes). The Department of Posts inaugurated the National Philatelic Museum on 11 July 2011. It exhibits rare postage stamps from around the world and provides a venue for philatelists to exhibit their collections.

=== Army Postal Service ===
The Army Postal Service (APS) functions as a government-operated military mail system in India. A primary feature of Army Postal Service systems is that normally they are subsidized to ensure that military mail posted between duty stations abroad and the home country (or vice versa) does not cost the sender any more than normal domestic mail traffic. In some cases, Indian military personnel in a combat zone may post letters and/or packages to the home country for free, while in others, senders located in a specific overseas area may send military mail to another military recipient, also located in the same overseas area, without charge.

=== Electronic Indian Postal Order ===
The Electronic Indian Postal Order (e-IPO) was introduced on 22 March 2013, initially only for citizens living abroad. The postal orders can be used for online payment of fees for access to information under the Right to Information Act, 2005. The service was expanded to include all Indian citizens on 14 February 2014.

=== Postal Life insurance ===
Postal Life Insurance (PLI) was introduced on 1 February 1884 with the express approval of the Secretary of State (for India) to Her Majesty, the Queen Empress of India. It was essentially a welfare scheme for the benefit of Postal employees in 1884 and later extended to the employees of Telegraph Department in 1888. In 1894, PLI extended insurance cover to female employees of P & T Department at a time when no other insurance company covered female lives. It is the oldest life insurer in this country. There was over 6.4 million policies active as on 31 March 2015 with a sum assured of ₹130,745 crore (US$14 billion). Premium income of PLI for the year 2014-15 was ₹6,053.2 crore (US$630 million). It was extended to all rural residents on 24 March 1995.

Policies for government employees include Santhosh (endowment assurance), Suraksha (whole-life assurance), Suvidha (convertible whole-life assurance), Sumangal (anticipated endowment policy) and Yugal Suraksha (joint life endowment assurance). India Post started Rural Postal Life Insurance (RPLI) for the rural public in 1995. RPLI plans include Gram Santosh (endowment assurance), Gram Suraksha (whole-life assurance), Gram Suvidha (convertible whole-life assurance), Gram Sumangal (anticipated endowment assurance) and Gram Priya.

=== Postal savings ===
The post office offers a number of savings plans, including recurring deposit accounts, Sukanya Samriddhi Account (SSA) is also known as Sukanya Samriddhi Yojana (SSY), National Savings Certificates (NSC), Kisan Vikas Patra (KVP), the Public Provident Fund, savings-bank accounts, monthly-income plans, senior-citizens' savings plans and time-deposit accounts.

=== Banking ===
In 2013, it was revealed that the Indian postal service had formulated plans to enter the banking industry after RBI guidelines for the issuance of new banking licenses were released. Eventually they are planning to open a Post Bank of India, an independent banking service.

As of 29 February 2016, 18,231 post offices are utilizing Core Banking Solutions (CBS). ATMs are installed at 576 Post Office locations and debit cards issued to Post Office Savings Bank customers. Core Insurance Solution (CIS) for Postal Life Insurance (PLI) is rolled out in 808 head post offices and corresponding 24,000+ sub post offices. In September 2017, it was announced that by 2018 all of the 1.55 lakh post offices, every postman and grameen dak sevak (postmaster) will accept all payment options that the India Post Payments Bank (IPPB) plans to provide.

On 1 September 2018, the India Post Payments Bank was inaugurated by Prime Minister Narendra Modi.

=== Data collection ===
A collaboration between the Ministry of Statistics and Programme Implementation (MoSPI) and the Department of Posts has enabled the computation of consumer-price indices for rural areas. These statistics were previously unobtainable, due to problems of remoteness and scale. The agreement authorises the postal service to collect data on prices paid for selected consumer goods. In February 2011, MoSPI published its first Consumer Price Index (CPI) and All-India Consumer Price Index. The information has since been published monthly, based on data available from 1,181 villages across the country.

=== E-commerce delivery ===
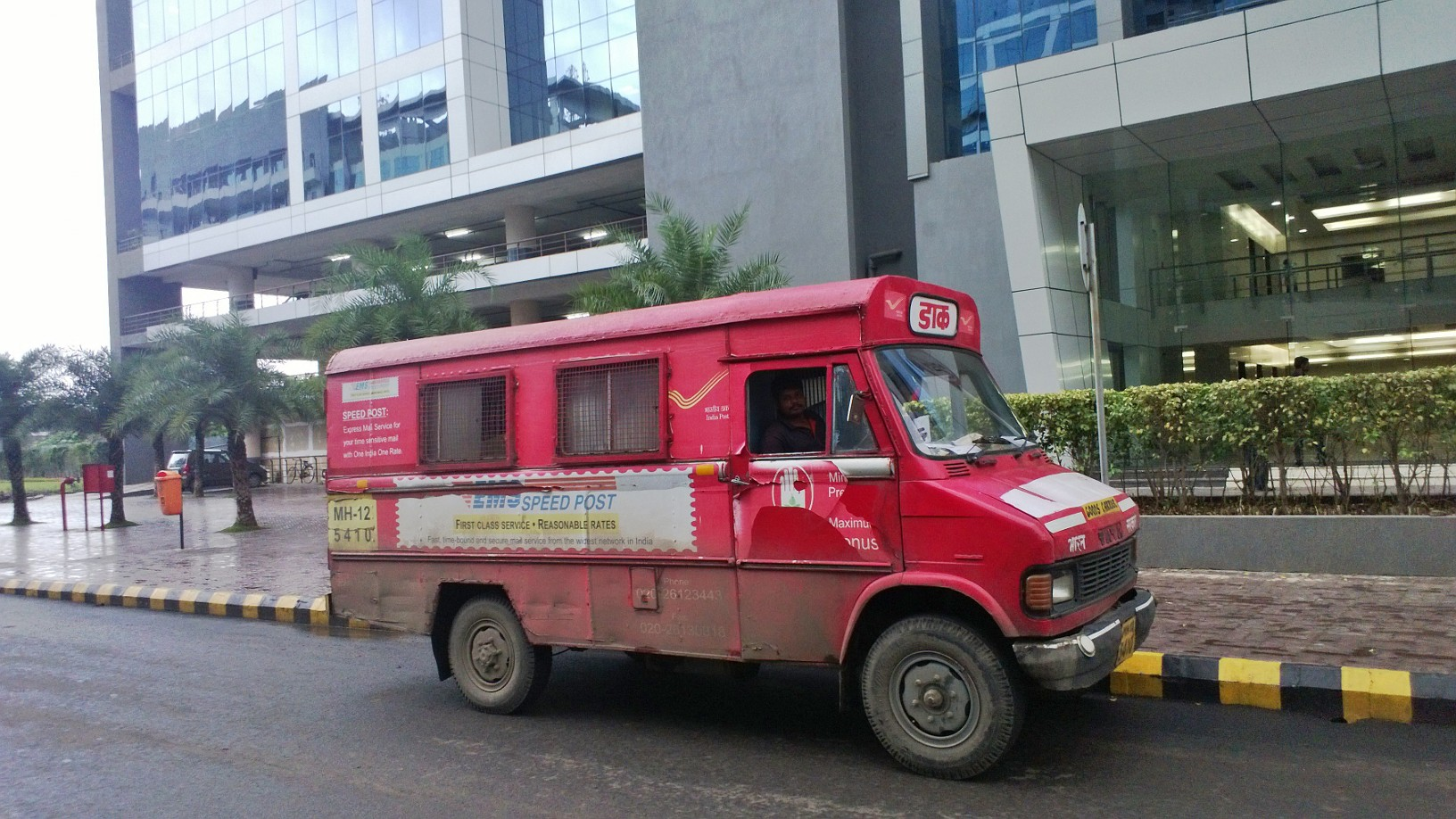
India Post service van delivering mails, Pune, Maharashtra

The boom in e-commerce and the surging number of cash-on-delivery consignments has led India Post to partner with major e-commerce portals for delivering pre-paid as well as cash on delivery (COD) parcels. According to the Minister for Communications and Information Technology, Ravi Shankar Prasad, revenue of India Post from such deliveries would go up to ₹15 billion (US$160 million) in the year 2015–16.

=== Other services ===
Other services include:

- Post boxes and post bags for mail receipt
- Speed Post
- Identity cards for proof of residence
- India Post ATM
- RMS (Railway Mail Service)
- Post office Passport Seva Kendras (POPSK)
- Aadhaar Enrollment and Updation.
- Western Union.
- Postal Life Insurance and Rural Postal Life Insurance.
- Savings Bank (SB/RD/TD/MIS/SCSS/PPF/SSA)
- Savings Cash Certificates.
- India Post Payments Bank (IPPB).
- Stamp Sales.

== See also ==
- List of Asian national postal services
