= National Philatelic Museum, New Delhi =

Museum at Dak Bhawan, New Delhi, India

Coordinates: 28.6226256°N 77.2134148°E

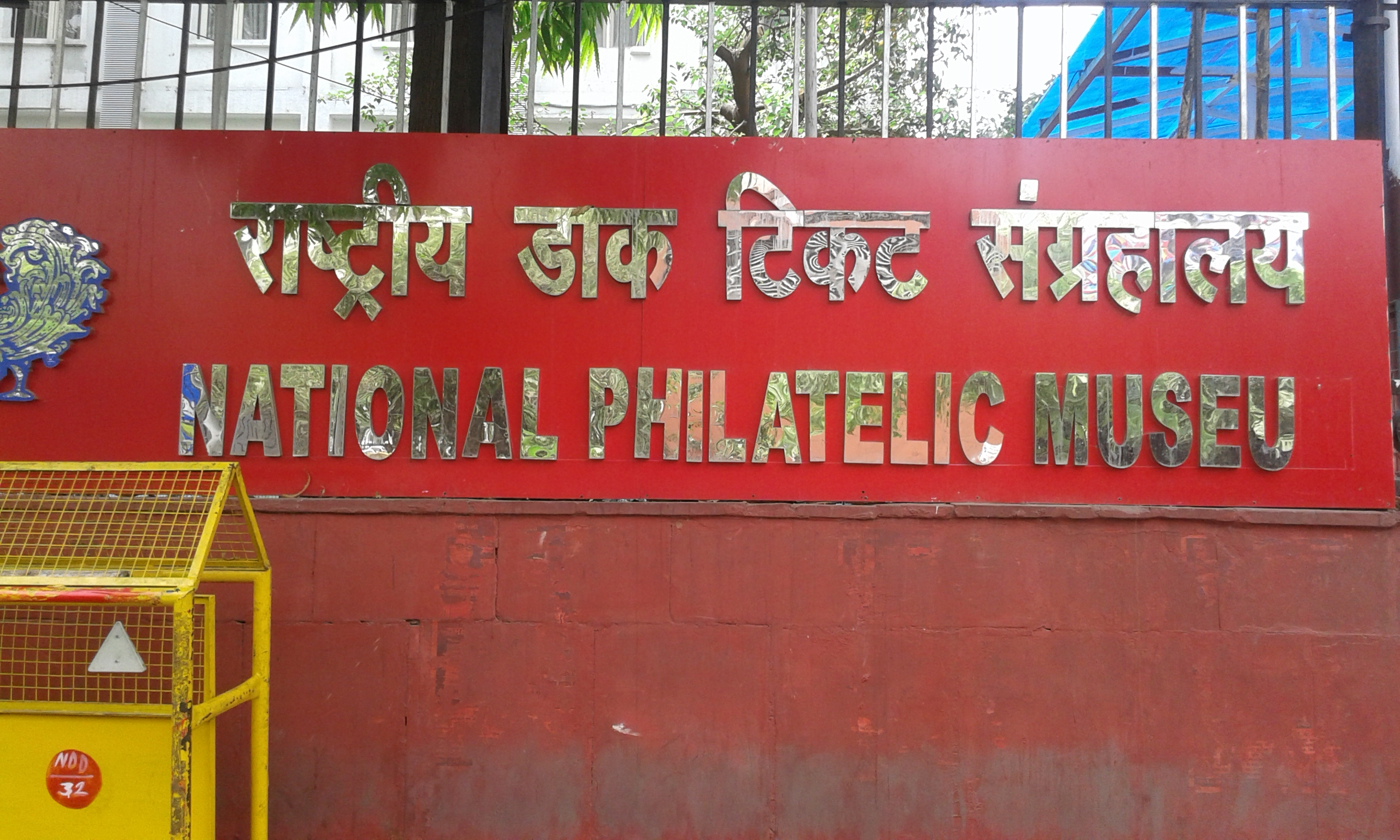
National Philatelic Museum in New Delhi in 2017

The National Philatelic Museum (NPM) at Dak Bhawan, New Delhi, India, is operated by the Department of Post. The facility. which is housed on the ground floor of a building, underwent a redevelopment in 2011. It now hosts an amphitheater for presentations and discussions, a library and an area where artists can be seen at work, as well as displays of postage stamps and related items. The museum has displayed a number of frames featuring exhibits of post-independence-era stamps.

The museum organises philatelic workshops on a regular basis with the students of different schools. The museum also has a souvenir shop which offers a variety of philatelic products like stamps, year packs, stamp albums, picture postcards, pictorial cancellation of National Philatelic Museum, and gift items.

This museum is presently closed for renovation work for few months.

== History ==
The museum was designed by Anand Burdhan of the School of Heritage Research and Management at Dr. B. R. Ambedkar University Delhi, who is also president of the Museum Association of India.

It is situated on Sansad Marg (Parliament Street) near Connaught Place, New Delhi, and is opened from 10 a.m. to 5 p.m. all days of the week for the visitors without any fee. The museum also figures on the list of HOHO Bus as one of the prominent stops.

== See also ==
- List of philatelic museums
