= Deccan Radio (Nizam Radio 1932) =

Deccan Radio was the first radio station of Hyderabad State (now Hyderabad, India) and went live on air on 3 February 1935. Deccan Radio was launched as a private broadcasting station with transmitting power of 200 Watts and was located at Chirag Ali lane at Abids, Hyderabad State The programmes were broadcast in Urdu.

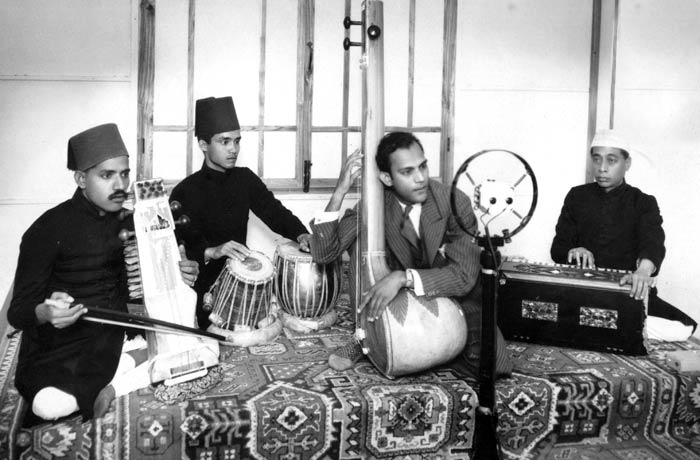
Performers in Opening seccion

Mir Osman Ali Khan, Asaf Jah VII took over The Deccan Radio and nationalised it on 3 February 1935. A new radio station was set up at Khairatabad, and a new transmitter of 500 Watts with 730 kHz was installed which was purchased from Marconi Company, England. During Second World War a special broadcast studio was set up at Saroornagar to broadcast live news programmes. In the same year, the older 200 Watt transmitter from Hyderabad was shifted to Aurangabad (part of then Hyderabad State) and a new radio station was started there. It was a district level radio station to broadcast programmes in Urdu and Marathi as most of the population speak Marathi.

On 1 December 1948, the Nizam inaugurated an upgraded 800 Watts unit, a shortwave transmitter which was installed with the mediumwave station and operated with 3335 and 6210 kHz. The World Radio Handbook had consecutively listed the editions of this station. Though, in the early 1919 the British cantonment of Secunderabad established the early communication station in the Hyderabad State and in 1924 an unknown spark station was operated from same region to which the Australian radio magazine in the same year named as VWT station.

It served as an official broadcaster of erstwhile Nizams's of Hyderabad, on 1 April 1950 Deccan Radio was taken over by Indian Government and in 1956 it was merged with All India Radio (AIR) and since then it is known as AIR-Hyderabad (100 kW).
