= Kisan Vikas Patra =

Indian saving certificate scheme

Kisan Vikas Patra is a saving certificate scheme which was first launched in 1988 by India Post. It was successful in the early months but afterwards the Government of India set up a committee under supervision of Shyamala Gopinath which gave its recommendation to the Government that KVP could be misused. Hence the Government of India decided to close this scheme and KVP was closed in 2011 and the new government re-launched it in 2014.

Kisan Vikas Patra can be purchased by :

- An adult in his own name, or on behalf of a minor
- A Trust
- Two adults jointly

== Interest income ==
The amount (Principal) invested in Kisan Vikas Patra would get doubled in 124 months as per existing rate of interest. The rate of interest is 7.5% from 01.10.2023 compounded annually.
