= 106.4 FM Radio Gold =

All India Radio radio station

Coordinates: 28.620965°N 77.210812°E

Radio Gold is a radio channel of All India Radio. It is aired in Delhi, Mumbai, Indore, Kolkata, and Chennai.

The 106.4 FM Radio Gold also started its transmission in other centres of Tamil Nadu like Coimbatore, Tuticorin and more recently, in Puducherry.
