= Independent voter =

Voter not aligned with any political party

An independent voter, often also called an unaffiliated voter or non-affiliated voter in the United States, is a voter who does not align themselves with any political party. An independent is variously defined as a voter who votes for candidates on issues or policies rather than on the basis of a political ideology or partisanship; a voter who does not have long-standing loyalty to, or identification/affiliation with, a political party; a voter who does not usually vote for the same political party and their candidates from election to election; or a voter who self-describes themselves as an independent.

Many voting systems outside of the United States, including the British parliamentary system, do not utilize a party affiliation system as part of their voter registration process; rather, participation in party affairs is based on enrolling as a member within the party itself, and the number of party members is much smaller than the party's total electorate (for example, the Social Democratic Party of Germany, which received 12 million votes in the 2021 German federal election, only has 400,000 members). The closest equivalent is the so-called "floater voters" or swing votes, who do not consistently vote for a particular party.

== Definition ==
The earliest concept of independents is of a person whose political choices, by definition, were made based on issues and candidates (due to lack of party affiliation). Furthermore, early studies of voting behavior conclusively demonstrated that self-identified independent voters are less interested in specific elections than partisan voters, poorly informed about issues and candidates, and less active politically. However, a contrary view emerged: The independent usually voted on the basis of deeply ingrained beliefs, attitudes and loyalties, and is more like the strongly partisan voter than any other voter (or the idealized "independent").

By the 1960s, scholars attempted to define the independent based on behavior, rather than party identification or loyalty. Focusing on ticket splitters, these studies depicted an independent voter who had the same level of political interest as strong partisans and who voted largely based on the issues with which they strongly agreed or disagreed. However, by focusing on voting behavior, this definition of the independent ignored non-voters. Critics claimed that the independent voter is merely a subset of the larger set of independents, which should also include non-voters. Studies also found that voting and not-voting is deeply affected by the particular candidate running in an election. Voting, therefore, is more reflective of what candidate is running—and therefore a poor measure of partisanship.

More recently, scholars focused on self-identification as a good measure of a person's political independence. The value of self-identification as a measure of a person's political independence or partisanship is that it is seen as a proxy for the behavior which should be exhibited by the independent voter. Additionally, self-identification could be easily captured either with a nominal question ("Do you self-identify with an existing political party?", a question which is answered with a "yes" or a "no"), or by a structured ordinal question ("Generally speaking, do you consider yourself a Democrat, a Republican, an independent, or what?"). The first analyses of this measure of political independence found that there were significant differences between those individuals who self-identified as "independent" and those who listed "no preference" as to party identification. Individuals who expressed "no preference" usually exhibited low levels of interest in politics, low levels of knowledge about the candidates and issues, low frequency of voting, and less confidence in their ability to influence politics.

Although some scholars continue to conclude that self-description is the best measure of partisanship or independence, a number of studies have found debilitating problems with this measure. The nature of the voter registration system and the appearance of the ballot, the way the question reinforces a unidimensional interpretation of the political arena, the measure's failure to function in a multi-party political system, the measure's confusion of the theoretical relationship between partisanship and the intent to vote, question wording errors which confuse a social group with a political party, failure to predict policy (versus candidate) preferences, question order, and failure to measure partisanship accurately when there are sizeable differences in party size all confound accurate measurement of partisanship and independence using this measure. Even the nature of a survey instrument as a measure of partisanship and independence has been called into question.

== Terminology ==
There are several synonyms for the term independent voter:

- In the U.S. state of Florida, a registered voter who chooses not to affiliate with a political party is termed no party affiliation (NPA).
- In the U.S. state of Massachusetts, a registered voter who chooses not to enroll in a political party or designation is termed unenrolled.
- In the U.S. state of Oregon, a registered voter who chooses not to affiliate with a political party is termed a non-affiliated voter (NAV).
- In the U.S. state of Pennsylvania, registered voters may choose the designation unaffiliated in lieu of a party affiliation.

== Partisan influence ==
To many scholars, independence seemed the flip-side of partisanship. Identifying the variables which are significant in creating partisanship would, therefore, identify the variables which are significant in creating political independence. Subsequently, a very large body of scholarship has emerged which has attempted to analyze partisanship.

Parents appear to be a primary source of political socialization and partisanship. Much of the theoretical basis for this hypothesis emerged from the fields of child psychology and social learning, which studied the ways in which children are socialized and values inculcated in them. Studies of political partisanship have found that partisanship is strongest when both parents have the same political loyalties, these loyalties are strong, both parents have similarly strong party loyalties, and parental partisanship accords with socio-economic status (for example, the wealthy are Republicans or the poor are Labour supporters).

Social groups are another source of partisanship. Friends, relatives, and neighbors often have the same partisan loyalties and strengths as one's parents. The more homogeneous the social group, the more likely the individual will be to develop strong partisan loyalties. When social group homogeneousness is low, the individual is likely to be less strongly socialized into partisan politics and more likely to seek a different party loyalty (whether by disengaging from partisanship or switching partisan loyalties).

Life-cycle and generational effects also contribute to partisanship. Initially, studies indicated that the operative variable was the "life-cycle." That is, a person's partisan attachments naturally grew stronger over time as weak socialization became strong and strong socialization became stronger. Additionally, theorists suggested that older voters favored certain policy preferences (such as strong government pensions and old-age health insurance) which led them to (strongly) favor one party over another. Later studies showed that the initial strong effect of the life-cycle variable was mitigated by generational effects. Party identification seemed strongly affected by certain formative generational events (such as the Civil War, the Great Depression or the social upheaval of the 1960s). Several studies concluded that generational effects were distinct from life-cycle effects, and that both factors were significant in creating (or not) partisanship.

But if generational events affected partisanship, some scholars hypothesized that lesser political, social, and economic issues might as well. Conceding that major "shocks" such as the Great Depression could realign or dealing partisanship, some scholars reasoned that a series of smaller shocks over time could also dramatically influence the direction and strength of partisanship. Many scholars became convinced that partisanship was not bedrock but shifting sand. Important childhood events (such as becoming aware of a presidential campaign) as well as events in adulthood (such as recessions, war, or shifting racial policies) could also affect the level of partisanship. The concept of "retrospective voting"—in which the voter makes political judgments based on the party-in-power's performance over the past few years—deeply influenced studies of partisanship. Applying the concept of retrospectiveness to partisanship, more recent analyses have concluded that retrospective and prospective political party success play a significant role in the direction and strength of partisanship.

Both repeated "minor shocks" and retrospective/prospective assessments of political party success are micro-level, rather than macro-level, variables. That is, while very important in creating political independence, they affect individuals only. For example, John may come to believe that Party A is no longer effective and become an independent. Yet, Mary may come to the conclusion that Party A is still effective. Both voters see the same successes and failures, but their retrospective and prospective calculus of success varies.

This has led some scholars to conclude that independence is not the flip-side of partisanship. Rather, partisanship and political independence may be two distinct variables, each of which must be measured separately and using different theoretical constructs. Other scholars have concluded that the causal direction of partisanship must be questioned. While it has long been assumed that partisanship and the strength of partisanship drive attitudes on issues, these scholars conclude that the causal relationship is reversed.

== Increase of independent voters ==
=== In the United States ===
Using the self-identification method of measuring political independence, surveys found an increasing number of independent voters beginning in 1966. In 1952, when modern polling on the issue began, the number of independent voters nationwide was 22 percent. By 1976, the number had risen more than half, to 36 percent of the electorate. Regionally, the rise of the independent voter was even more apparent. In the non-Deep South, the number of independent voters had risen from 22 percent to 37 percent. But in the Deep South, the number of independents rose steeply from 14 percent in 1952 to 32 percent in 1976 (and would rise even further, to 35 percent, by 1984).

Gallup polls data shows independent leaning voters represent the majority of American voters, a trend since 2004.

Although the number of self-identified independents has fallen slightly in the 1990s and 2000s, about 30 percent of American voters still say they are independents (as measured by self-identification).

..If one distinguishes between respondents who are adamant about their independence and those who concede closeness to a party. ... In short, the vast majority of self-defined Independents are not neutral but partisan—a bit bashful about admitting it, but partisan nevertheless. Once this is recognized, the proportion of the electorate that is truly neutral between the two parties is scarcely different now than from what it was in the Eisenhower era. Moreover, because these "pure Independents" now are less inclined to vote, their share of the voting population is, if anything, a bit smaller now than in the 1950s and 1960s.

Several analyses conclude that (whether through survey error or misconceptualization of the nature of political independence) the number of independent voters has remained relatively unchanged in the United States since the 1950s.

==== Reasons ====
In the United States, voter identification as an independent varies widely across regions as well as states. Inter-party competition, the organizational strength of each party, electoral variables (such as the ease of voter registration, voting procedures, the timing of primaries and elections, etc.), and even turnout seem to greatly affect the number of independents in a state. The effect of these variables is not uniform across all the states, either.

=== In Europe ===
In the British parliamentary system, a similar concept of a "floating voter" is used to describe voters who can change their voting alignment and freedom from political parties. This term may be applied in referendum votes, such as in the vote for "Brexit". Dutch politics also uses the term floating voter to describe party non-affiliation.

=== In Iran ===
There is a large swing vote in Iran, known as "Party of the Wind" (Persian: حزب باد, romanized: Ḥezb-e Bād), or "grey vote" (Persian: رأی خاکستری, romanized: Ra'ye Ḵākestarí), which can be rapidly excited.

== Impact ==
Because independent voters do not have strong affectional ties to political parties, scholars who adhere to the self-identification method for measuring political independence theorize that independents may be more susceptible to the appeals of third-party candidates. It has also been suggested that the more independent voters, the more volatile elections and the political system will be. Others hypothesize that the amount of ticket-splitting will increase, leading to greater parity between the strongest political parties, an increase in the number of minor political parties (particularly "down-ballot" in state, county or local races), or possibly even a breakdown in the political party system.

Scholars who hold to the behavioral measure of determining political independence point out that there has been little change in the level of ticket-splitting since the initial upsurge in the 1950s. They also posit that, when independents who strongly lean toward one party are included in the same group as that party's strong partisans, there has also been little change in party loyalty since the 1950s. For example, partisan Republicans and independents who lean Republican tend to vote for Republican candidates just as frequently in the 1990s as they did in the 1950s. In the United States, the tendency of both strong and weak partisans to vote a straight ticket in down-ballot races is even stronger than it is for presidential and congressional races.

Many scholars also say that partisanship is only one of many variables which predict voting choice. A decline in partisanship may have little to no impact on election outcomes, and much depends on fluctuations in these other factors.

=== Realigning elections ===
For more than half a century, the concept of a realigning election—a dramatic shift in the electoral coalition supporting the existing political system—has been an important one in political theory. First enunciated by V. O. Key, Jr. in 1955, the theory of realigning elections suggested that certain "critical elections" created sudden, massive shifts in the electorate. The political party and policies of the status quo were changed, and a new governing coalition installed which would rule for decades until the next critical election. The theory of critical elections fit well with what scholars knew about generational effects and the emerging literature on "major shocks" as a variable in determining the existence, direction, and strength of partisanship. It also helped explain the radical shifts in national politics which occurred irregularly in American history. Scholars also hypothesized that realigning elections rejuvenated public support for the political system, which helped explain the relative stability of American political structures. In time, scholars refined the theory somewhat. The concept of "secular realignment" was developed to account for gradual shifts in politics which had similar effects (eventually) to a critical realigning election. Some studies concluded that "secular realignment" came in short, jerky, periods called "punctuations." Initially, the concept of a realigning election was monolithic, that is, the effects were believed to be national in effect. But beginning in the 1980s, political scientists began to conclude that realigning elections could occur on sub-national levels (such as regions or even within states).

But with the "rise of the independent voter" and no realigning election, scholars developed the theory of the "dealigning election." In the dealigning election, all political parties lose support as partisanship decreases and political independence rises. Split-ticket voting and issue-oriented voting increase, leading to political volatility. Divided government (one party controls the executive branch, while another controls the legislature) becomes the norm.

A number of scholars have dismissed the theory of realignment and dealignment, however. They argue that the concept is vague and the data do not support mass change in electoral behavior. The large number of qualifications which must be made to the theory of critical elections has rendered it useless, it is argued. The theory of secular realignment has been particularly criticized. The replacement of elderly voters (who die) with a new generation of voters (who come of age and are eligible to vote) is normal, not a unique and irregular "punctuation" or "surge," it is claimed. Still other scholars claim there are no regional dealignment variations while others argue that the concept of realignment and dealignment is no longer useful in an era in which political parties are no longer very important in the political system.

=== Impact of dealignment ===
Scholars argue that political parties play a critical supportive role in democracies. Parties regulate the type and number of people seeking election, mobilize voters and enhance turnout, and provide the coalition-building structure essential for office-holders to govern. Parties also serve as critical reference groups for voters, framing issues and providing and filtering information. These functions, it is claimed cannot otherwise be accomplished, and democracies collapse without them. Only political parties serve these roles.

Dealignment—the rise in the number of independent voters—has an extremely deleterious effect on democracy, these scholars claim. Dealignment leads to the rise of candidate-centered elections in which parties and ideologies play little part. Without parties, candidates rely ever-more heavily on mass media for communication, political action committees (PACs) for funds, special interest groups for staff, and political consultants for expertise. The increasing reliance on mass communication leads to a withering of political discourse as the sound bite and an emphasis on the horse-race aspect of politics becomes the norm. This limits the amount and kind of information the public receives, leading to less choice for voters. When voters can stay at home and watch television rather than participate in civic life, the public no longer perceives the need to become involved in democracy—and so the civic life of the democracy withers. As PACs and interest groups become more important, the number of people speaking to the public, providing political information and different political choices and views, declines. Additionally, PAC and interest group spokespeople may not be representative of the public or the groups they claim to speak for, creating disenfranchisement of various (often minority) groups. As independent voting and ticket-splitting rise, parties seek to insulate themselves from the whipsaw effect of elections. The power of incumbency becomes increasingly important, and accessibility by the public declines. Parties seek increasingly moderate positions in order to stay electorally viable, further limiting political choice ("both parties look and sound the same"). As the parties distance themselves from the average voter and seem to offer limited policy options, dealignment worsens. As ideology plays less and less a part in elections, it becomes more and more difficult for parties to forge coalitions of like-minded officeholders. Governmental deadlock becomes common, further encouraging independent voting as citizens perceive "their" party to be ineffective. As ticket-splitting rises, divided government becomes the norm, making it even more difficult for office-holders to enact and implement policies. Politics becomes increasingly volatile, with first one party and then another governing. Although parties once held politicians accountable for their actions, their increasing irrelevance in politics leads to a decline in accountability (and thus even less responsiveness and less democracy). The "Imperial Presidency" becomes more important, since single officeholders with great power become the only politicians capable of governing.

Other scholars have concluded that dealignment has not harmed democracy. Political parties have adapted to the realities of large numbers of independent voters, it is argued. The candidate-centered election has actually revitalized parties, and led to new party structures and behaviors which have allowed parties to survive in the age of mass communication. A minority view, however, suggests that the evidence for a resurgence of political parties too equivocal, and that scholars lack the theoretical concepts to make such judgments.

Yet another strain of thought has concluded that "realignment" is occurring. The slow "secular realignment" is not yet over, these scholars say. Regional differences in the level and impact of dealignment simply point up the fact that major shifts in political coalitions are occurring. Slowly but surely, these studies conclude, realignment is happening and will be obvious within a generation. These scholars argue that the surge in independent voters which began in the 1960s has ended, and that there are distinct signs that partisanship is on the rise again.

== See also ==
- Centrism
- Independent politician
- Independent Democrat
- Independent Republican (disambiguation)
- Radical center (politics)
- Swing vote
