= Political cognition =

Topic in sociology

Political cognition refers to the study of how individuals come to understand the political world, and how this understanding leads to political behavior. Some of the processes studied under the umbrella of political cognition include attention, interpretation, judgment, and memory. Most of the advancements in the area have been made by scholars in the fields of social psychology, political science, and communication studies.

== History ==
In the early 20th century, the psychological study of cognition encountered significant push back from behaviorism. According to behaviorists, if social psychology was to be considered a serious science, it should study observable and measurable phenomena. Since the processes of the mind are not observable and thus are hard to measure, behaviorists believed that these were not worth studying. However, as Gestalt psychology was introduced to the US by European immigrants, the dominance of the behaviorist approach began to decline. Questions related to perception, judgment, impression formation, and attitude change began to attract more researchers. In the 1950s, the development of new methodological tools ignited the Cognitive Revolution. In 1984, Susan Fiske and Shelley E. Taylor published the first social cognition book, Social Cognition.

=== Early theories of social cognition ===
==== Naïve scientist ====
First proposed by Fritz Heider in 1958, the Naïve scientist model of cognition conceptualizes individuals as actors with limited information that want to derive an accurate understanding of the world. Much of the work done within this model focused on examining how people perceive and explain why others behave the way they do. This work served as the basis for the development of modern theories of attribution, advanced independently by Harold Kelley and Bernard Weiner. Kelley's attribution theory included the interaction between three variables: consistency, consensus, and distinctiveness. This interaction was summarized in Kelley's Covariation model, also known as Kelley's cube. Consistency refers to whether the person exhibit the behavior across time. The more the person exhibits the behavior across time, the more representative this behavior is of the person. Consensus refers to whether other individuals exhibits the same behavior when presented in the same situation. If many individuals exhibit the same behavior, then the behavior is less informativeness of the person. Distinctiveness refers to whether the person exhibits similar behavior in other situations. The more the person exhibits the behavior in other situation, the less the behavior is representative of the individual.

==== Cognitive miser ====
The cognitive miser model argues that, when individuals are attempting to understand the world, they tend to prefer methods that allow them to reduce the amount of cognitive work required to process information. This preference for efficiency leads to the development of biases and heuristics. In the past, political psychologists have identified a wide range of biases and heuristics—such as partisan heuristics and the Black utility heuristic—that people use to make political decisions.

==== Motivated reasoning ====
Motivated reasoning is a cognitive phenomena that occurs when an individual changes a peripheral attitude that is inconsistent with a more central element of the self. The purpose of these cognitive biases is to maintain a positive sense of self-esteem. In the past, they have been referred to as cognitive adaptions and positive illusions. Motivated reasoning has been extensively studied in political psychology. One of the most significant contributions of this area of research is the identification of cases in which voters adopt their preferred candidates' or party' policy positions.

=== Study of public opinion ===
In political science, the study of political cognition was facilitated by the emergence of survey research and a growing interest in understanding how individual make voting decisions.

In the 1930s, however, the explosion of commercial polling agencies facilitated the collection of data at the individual level. The availability of this new type of data increased an interest in understanding what individuals know about politics, what attitudes individual have towards political objects, and how individuals make political decisions. In 1940, Paul Lazarsfeld, Bernard Berelson, and Hazel Gaudet carried out one of the earliest studies examining how individual-level factors influence political decisions. The study took place in Erie County, Ohio. Lazarsfeld, Berelson, and Gaudet were interested in identifying what sources of information influence an individual's political attitudes during an electoral campaign. They found that, among those who were less interested in politics, had not decided who to support, or change their voting intentions during the campaign, personal influences—such as the opinion of a friend or a family member—played a more significant role than the media. In 1948, by Bernard Berelson, Paul F. Lazarsfeld, and William N. McPhee carried out a similar study in Elmira, New York.

Both the Erie County and the Elmira studies had been significantly influential to the study of American public opinion. Their findings have been replicated repeatedly and still explain the ways people develop political attitudes today. The biggest influence of these studies, however, was their methodological approach. These two studies were the first studies that followed an individual's political attitudes and voting intentions throughout a campaign with an interview-reinterview approach.

In 1944, the National Opinion Research Center (NOR) at the University of Chicago was the first organization ever to collect panel data at a national level in the United States. In the elections of 1944 and 1948, the Survey Research Center of the University of Michigan performed similar panel-data studies at the national level. These studies were characterized by unstructured questions that allowed participants to express what they knew about politics, as well as what attitudes they had towards political actors and policies.

== Major theories of voting behavior (1950s–1980s) ==
=== The rational voter ===
In his 1957 book, An Economic Theory of Democracy, Anthony Downs argues that individuals are rational voters—i.e., they decide who to support by calculating which candidate will maximize the benefits they receive from the government, while minimizing the costs. This rational calculation is performed by taking into consideration the individual's interest, what the party in office has done in the past, and what the party in office and the party out of office could do in the future.

Downs defines political parties as coalitions of political elites, whose primary goal is to be elected to office. Because they know voters behave rationally, parties adopt the policy positions of most voters to maximize their chances of being elected into office. The interaction between the rational behavior of voters and the rational behavior of the political elite facilitates the development of a two-party system when voters are normally distributed along the liberal-conservative spectrum. The reason for this is that each party will try to maximize the number of voters it can appeal to while still maintaining significant distinctions from the other party. This results in a party heuristic: voters start to consistently support the party that is closest to their beliefs along this liberal-conservative lines.

Since its publication, the theory of rational voter has encountered numerous empirical challenges, as research suggests that the average voter is not equipped with the necessary information to make rational decisions as defined by Downs. Specifically, most American voters are unable to think in ideological terms—i.e., to articulate their political positions using coherent belief systems. Drawing from social cognition theories, some scholars have argued voters might be still able to make rational decisions even if they are incapable of putting their perceptions, beliefs, and rationales into the formal language of political elites. Specifically, these critics believe that, instead of expecting the average voter to present high levels of political sophistication, political scientists should take into account individual-level variations of information acquisition and processing. They propose that partisan biases motivate individuals to seek out and reject particular sets of information that then lead to candidate evaluations, and then voting. Thus, these critics advance a theory of rational voter that incorporates both cognitive processes and economic utility calculations.

=== Party attachment ===
In 1960, Angus Campbell, Philip E. Converse, Warren E. Miller, and Donald E. Stokes published The American Voter. Unlike most prior work, The American Voter was the first book to systematically analyze quantitative data at the national level from three presidential elections (Truman-Dewey in 1948, Eisenhower-Stevenson in 1952, and Eisenhower-Stevenson in 1956). This data was collected by the Survey Research Center of the University of Michigan. The theoretical framework derived from these studies is thus known as Michigan model. The American Voter is also one of the first works to ever look for observable implications of the rational choice theory of voting behavior—a body of work that claims voters are aware of political events, have well-developed political attitudes, and thus are able to aligned their votes with the candidate that is closest to their political dispositions. Lastly, this book was also one of the first works to incorporate a social psychological perspective to the study of politics.

Taken as a system, these [attitudinal] variables were seen to constitute a field of forces operating on the individual as he deliberates over his vote decision.

As described by the quote above, the authors of this seminal work that a Lewinian view of the political world. They conceptualize attitudes towards political objects as field forces that led an individual to decide who to support in an election. According to Campbell and colleagues, the most significant of these forces is partisan identification, which the authors defined as a psychological attachment to a party. These psychological attachments are developed early in life and remain stable throughout adulthood. Today, partisan identification is still the strongest and most reliable predictor of vote choice. According to Campbell and colleagues, these partisan attachments function as lenses that paint the way people perceive political information about issues and political actors. Specifically, voters accept and endorse information that is consistent with their partisan beliefs, and reject information that is inconsistent with their partisan views. Additionally, since most voters do not have the time to acquire and process all political information available, they use these partisan attachments as heuristics, or shortcuts, when deciding who to support.

=== Political information and voter sophistication ===
==== Ideology ====
In his widely known book chapter, "The Nature of Belief Systems", Philip E. Converse examines the nature of abstract political thought among American voters. Converse defined a belief system as a set of idea-elements that were interconnected by logical, psychological, or social constraints. These belief systems could vary in terms of how central certain idea-elements are to the belief system relative to other idea-elements. The centrality of each idea-element influences whether an individual changes her belief based on external changes in the political world. Idea-elements that are peripheral to an individual's belief system are more likely to change than idea-elements that are central to an individual's belief system.

To perform this study, Converse relied on the analysis of open-ended questions. He specifically examines two things. First, he examines what types of political information is associated with what type of political attitudes. Second, he examines whether voters are able to provide an abstract reason to explain this association by referring to the liberal-conservative spectrum. He found that most voters do not think in coherent ideological terms. He divided voters into five types based on their ideological sophistication: Ideologues, Near Ideologues, Group Interest, Nature of the Times, and No issue content. About less than 10% of the voters are considered ideologues or near ideologues. Converse's findings provided further evidence against the theory of rational voting, as voters seem not to be aware of political events, seem to lack well-developed political attitudes, and thus might be unequipped to make rational and informed decisions.

==== Political attitudes ====
In 1992, political scientist John Zaller published his book, The Nature and Origins of Mass Opinion. In this work, the author examines the processes by which people develop and report their political opinions. According to Zaller, the study of political opinion must be understood through the lens of political awareness and political values, which is summarized in his Receive-Accept-Sample (RAS) model. This model contends that individuals receive political information, decide what to accept and store in memory based on their political values, and when asked to express their opinions about a topic they use a sample of whatever relevant information is accessible in memory to construct their opinions on the spot.

Since most people do not have a direct experience with the political world, they often rely on the political elite—which includes both politicians and the media—to acquire political information. Zaller argues that voters vary greatly in terms of political awareness either because of a lack of interest in politics or because of a lack of time to pay attention. Consequently, the average voter tends to score low on measures of political knowledge. Zaller observes that this lack of political information is associated with the high level of attitude instability that is exhibited among voters. According to Zaller, this instability is a sign of voters constructing their opinion statements on the spot based on relevant information that happens to be available in memory, rather than the complete non-existence of an attitude (as suggested by Converse) or measurement error.

When voters receive information from the political elite, they almost never receive a complete and neutral account of facts. They receive an oversimplified version of the relevant information that often comes with a political frame, which interacts with the voter's predispositions. If the information is consistent with the voter's prior beliefs, then the information is accepted and stored in memory. If the information is inconsistent with the voter's prior beliefs, then the information is not accepted.

In political science, Zaller's work has been instrumental in the examination of two major types of evaluations: 1) on-line evaluations, and 2) memory-based evaluations. On-line evaluation model asserts that individuals update their evaluations of political objects every time they acquire new information. The memory-based evaluation model asserts that individuals construct their evaluations on the spot based on information available in the working memory. Because most voters fail to recall the content of information they are exposed to during a campaign, many political scientists believed that voters rely on memory-based processes to make political judgments. On the contrary, other scholars believed that voters do update their evaluations of political objects as they acquire new information, but these updates take the form of affective evaluations. Specifically, when voters receive political information—either from a political campaign or from the media—the voter processes that information and turns it into an affective evaluation that is then stored in memory. These stored affective evaluations are then used to make political decisions along with memory-based information. This process is known as the dual processing model.

=== Priming and agenda setting ===
Priming is a cognitive process that occurs when a stimulus changes the attitudinal or behavioral response of an individual. This process is facilitated by the activation of information related to the stimulus in the working memory with or even without the individual's awareness. Psychologists have tested this by priming different cognitive styles in the lab and then having participants read articles about political issues. The thought styles can shift people's support for or away from particular policies.

In the study of politics, priming effects have also been studied with relation to the media and political campaigns. In 1987, Shanto Iyengar and Donald Kinder published News That Matters: Televised and American Opinion. This work reported the results of a series experiments designed to assess the role of the media on political attitudes. They found that the primarily role of the media is to set the agenda for political evaluations. According to the authors, the media is able to achieve this by priming—or in this case, by making more salient—certain political issues. These salient issues are then used to make political evaluations. Additional work has illustrated that priming only occurs among topics in which the voter has already well-established predispositions.

=== Persuasion ===
Most research about political persuasion has taken place within the context of campaign effect. Early work finds that campaigns that use various forms of personal contact (e.g., canvassing and telephone calls) to deliver information are more effective than campaigns that use non-personal contact (e.g., mailing information) at mobilizing voters. Contemporary research suggests that whenever persuasion—defined as an attitude change—is achieved, its effects are relatively small and fade away rapidly. Additionally, well-developed political predisposition are not easily persuadable, while less developed attitudes move around fairly easily.

== Social identities and inter-group relations ==
=== Linked fate: black utility heuristic ===
In his 1994 book, Behind the Mule: Race and Class in African-American Politics, Michael Dawson argues African American voters use evaluations of their group-level interests as short-cuts to determine the policy positions, vote choice, and political engagement that would safeguard their individual-level interest. According to Dawson, this political heuristic was developed as a consequence of the historical oppression of African Americans, which facilitated the development of the belief that individual interest was linked to the racial group interest among African Americans. Consequently, this black utility heuristic is known as linked fate. Dawson argues that racial issues override class-based differences which result in the political homogeneity of African Americans. Additional work suggests that other groups—including Whites, Asian Americans, Latinxs, and women—also exhibit linked fate.

Other researchers have advocated for the revision of the current linked fate measure, as it seems to be inconsistently associated with group identification and with political engagement.

== See also ==
- Neuropolitics – Interdisciplinary field of study
- Political psychology – Interdisciplinary study of the relationship between political and psychological processes
- Voting behavior – How voters decide how to vote
- Public opinion – Aggregate of individual attitudes or beliefs held by the adult population
- Attitude (psychology) – Concept in psychology and communication studies
- Social cognition – Study of cognitive processes involved in social interactions
