= Role of networks in electoral behavior =

Networks in electoral behavior, as a part of political science, refers to the relevance of networks in forming citizens’ voting behavior at parliamentary, presidential or local elections. There are several theories emphasizing different factors which may shape citizens' voting behavior. Many influential theories ignore the possible influence of individuals' networks in forming vote choices and focus mainly on the effects of own political attitudes – such as party loyalties or party identification developed in childhood proposed by the Michigan model, or on the influence of rational calculations about the political parties’ ideological positions as proposed by spatial and valence theories. These theories offer models of electoral behavior in which individuals are not analyzed within their social networks and environments. In a more general context, some authors warn that the hypothesis testing done mainly based on sample surveys and focused on individuals’ attributes without looking at relational data (relations among individuals) seems to be a poor methodological instrument. However, models emphasizing the influence of individuals’ social networks in shaping their electoral choices have been also present in the literature from the very beginning.

== Theories emphasizing the relevance of networks ==
There are three main (theoretical and empirical) approaches emphasizing the importance of networks in shaping electoral decisions: using surveys to measure actors’ (in this case voters’) attitudes (Columbia Studies), measuring collective patterns of social groups on an aggregate level as supplementary information (Contextual analysis) and focusing on interpersonal dynamics among individuals.

=== Columbia Studies ===
The relevance of networks in individuals' electoral choices was first identified by Lazarsfeld and his colleagues in The People's Choice: How the Voter Makes Up His Mind in a Presidential Campaign and in Voting: A Study of Opinion Formation in a Presidential Campaign. Their findings were mainly based on a survey gathered in 1940 in Erie County, Ohio and on a survey collected in 1948 in Elmira, New York. The model proposed by them is usually referred to as the model of Columbia Studies. Individuals' perception of the political world is conceptualized in network terms according to this model. The main argument of these books is that the interpersonal influence of their families, friends and co-workers form voters’ political views. Voters’ choices are shaped through interpersonal communication networks. These horizontal networks have a stronger effect on individuals’ political decisions than the opinions and viewpoints presented and framed in the media. Social categories – such as religion and class – may also explain individuals’ choices. A businessman with friends and co-workers from that class is more likely to vote for a Republican candidate than a blue-collar worker. The findings may be concluded in the following way: "they (voting decisions) are relatively invulnerable to direct argumentation and vulnerable to indirect social influences”. Major criticisms of this model were developed on their data collection methods. Respondents were asked about the possible opinions of their three best friends and three closest co-workers. However, not the actual opinions of these individuals, rather respondents' perceptions of their opinions were collected. This is why some authors think that the Columbia Studies can not be regarded as a predecessor of social network analysis.

=== Contextual analysis ===
The main claim of the literature on contextual analysis is that individuals live in a social environment that should be taken into account when one analyzes their political orientations. The particular social or political context (which may be institutional, occupational or residential for instance) someone lives in shapes his/her interpersonal interactions and thus his/her political behavior. Coming back to the previous example blue-collar workers are more likely to support a Republican candidate if they live in a neighborhood where most of the residents are white-collar workers than those blue-collars workers who live in neighborhoods with a higher percentage of blue-collar worker residents. One may see that the logic of this approach is very close to that of the Columbia Studies but is more focused on communities and contains a lower explicit emphasis on interpersonal networks.

=== Interpersonal dynamics ===
The third approach focuses on interpersonal interactions with the assumption that individuals are members of networks in which political information spreads through communication. Information with higher quality spreading through the communication channels probably has a stronger effect on political choices.

== Empirical data on the relevance of networks in electoral choices ==
Although there are several possible research designs to analyze networks in political context, the relevance of networks in shaping electoral choices has been approached in three main manners – all being observational research designs.

Firstly, most of the authors follow the data gathering technique and research design of Columbia Studies. It means that the randomly chosen respondents within a limited area are asked about their closest friends/relatives/co-workers (sometimes also about the closeness of this particular relationships) and about their possible political orientations. One famous example was done by Laumann in 1973 in Detroit in which he shows that the closer the ties are for a respondent, the greater the political homogeneity the network has. Another example could be the work by Knoke (1990) which uses a very similar research design but is based on a national sample (the General Social Survey). He shows that both the extent to which respondents' environments are politicized and the frequency of political discussions they have influence their party choices. These studies may be done in either a cross-sectional design at one time point or in a panel design through the repeated measurement of the same individuals.

Secondly and thirdly, the contextual analysis approach has come up with slightly different research designs. One way to incorporate information about respondents’ communities is to include aggregate level neighborhood characteristics in the individual level data. Another way to detect respondents’ communities is based on the snowball survey technique. Similarly to the research designs done by the Columbia Studies authors, respondents are asked about their closest friends. However, unlikely to those studies, in this case these friends are directly surveyed as well – thus not only the perception of their opinion is gathered.
