= The Voter Decides =

1954 book by Angus Campbell, Gerald Gurin, and Warren E. Miller

- Author: Angus Campbell, Gerald Gurin, Warren E. Miller
- Language: English
- Subject: Political science
- Genre: Non-fiction
- Publication date: 1954

The Voter Decides is a 1954 political science book by Angus Campbell, Gerald Gurin, and Warren E. Miller. It first developed the notion of "party identification" or, in abbreviated form, "Party ID." Party ID is the sense of personal attachment the individual feels toward the political group or party of his or her choice.

== Synopsis ==
The Voter Decides developed three theories as to how a person acquires Party ID.

1. Party attachment, like church preference, may be passed down from parent to child.
2. People may remain in the same class, ethnic and religious groups as their parents and are subject to the same group influences as their parents.
3. People may tend to consciously or otherwise make the memory of their parents' partisanship conform to their attachments.

In short, once a Party ID is acquired (through unknowing absorption from a very young age) the person spends the rest of his or her life adopting views and positions that create a reason for their party affiliation.
