= Negative partisanship =

Opposition to a disliked political party

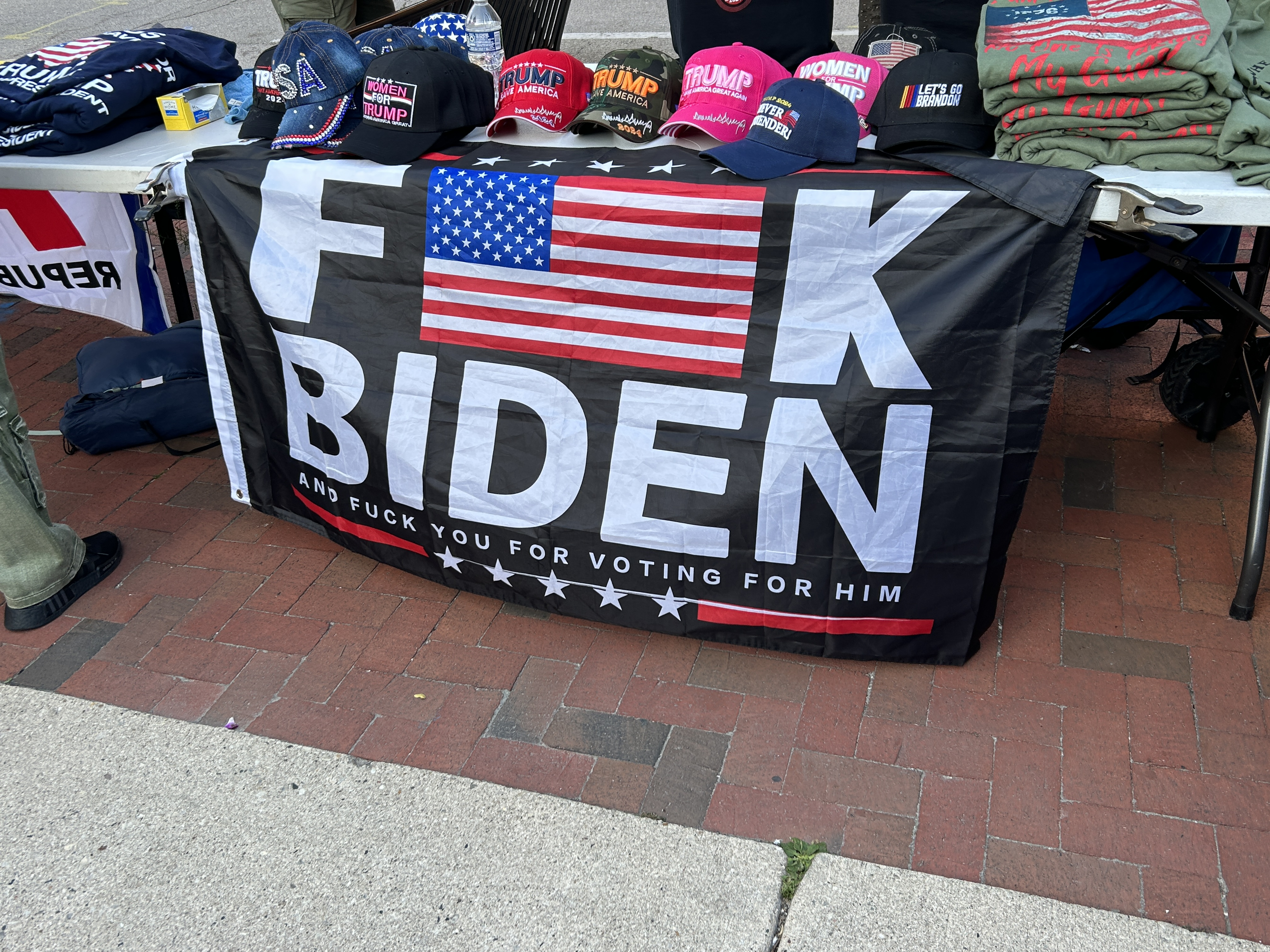
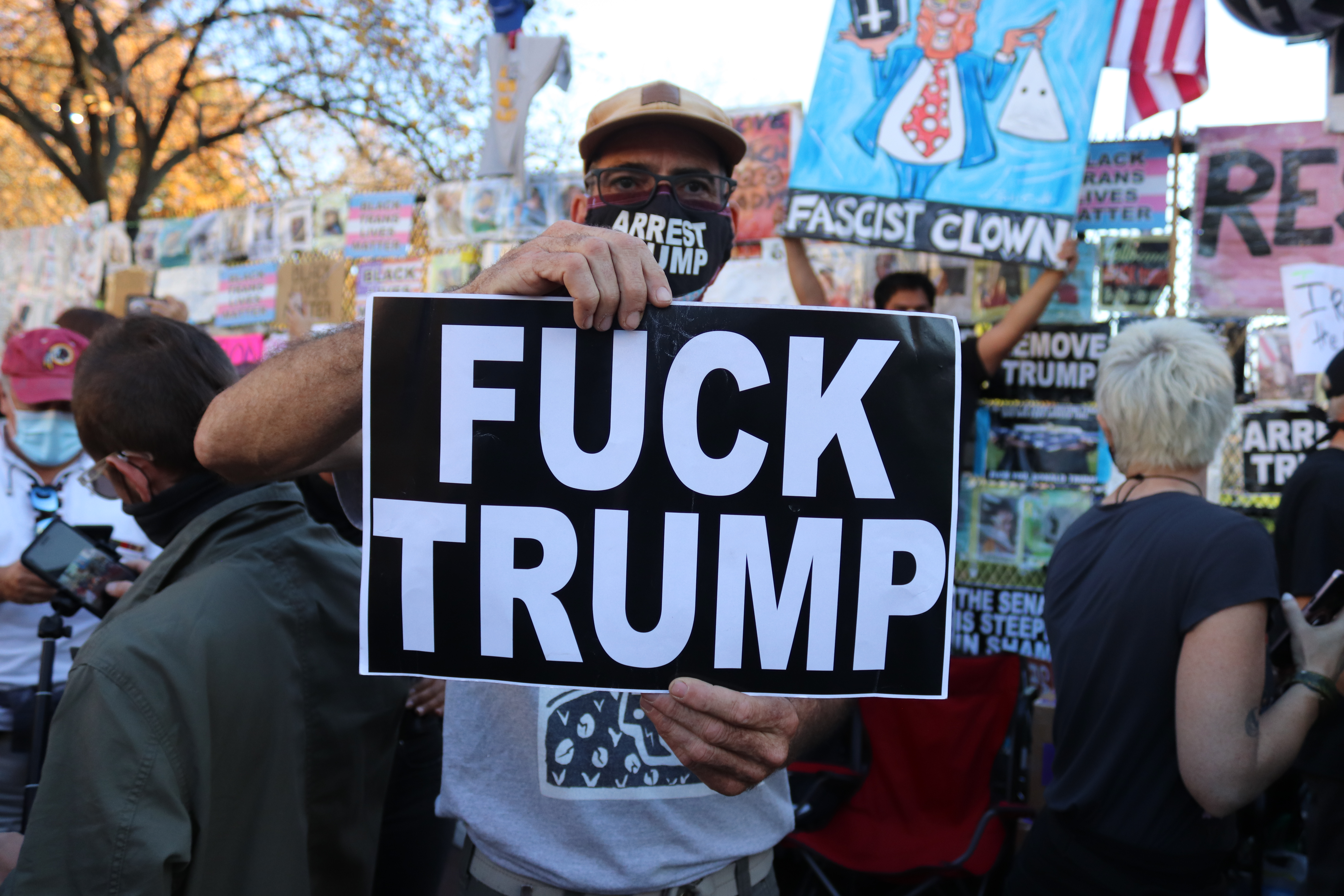
Vulgar protests against United States presidents Joe Biden and Donald Trump.

Negative partisanship is the tendency of some voters to form their political opinions primarily in opposition to political parties they dislike. Whereas traditional partisanship involves supporting the policy positions of one's own party, its negative counterpart in turn means opposing those positions of a disliked party. It has been claimed to be the cause of severe polarization in American politics. It has also been studied in the Canadian context, as well as in Australia and New Zealand. Cross-national studies indicate that negative partisanship undermines public satisfaction with democracy, which threatens democratic stability. Traditional partisans, on the other hand, are more likely to support their country's democracy, which promotes democratic stability.

== United States ==
Alan Abramowitz, a professor of political science at Emory University, likens negative partisanship to a sports rivalry, where members of one side may have internal disagreements but are motivated to a far greater extent by hatred of the other side. According to his research, negative feelings towards the opposing political party have risen above positive feelings towards one's own political party since the 1980s, along with the increase in straight-ticket voting. The phenomenon of negative partisanship was further exacerbated during the 2016 election, in which both major candidates, Donald Trump and Hillary Clinton, received record low "feeling thermometer" ratings in a Pew Research Center study.

Rachel Bitecofer expands on Abramowitz's ideas, advocating a theory under which elections are fundamentally driven by voter turnout instead of swing voters as traditionally believed. In this framework, it is more important to turn out the base than appeal to ideological moderates. However, some, like David Wasserman of The Cook Political Report, have challenged this view, noting the phenomenon of Obama-Trump voters, or Americans who voted for Barack Obama in 2008 and/or 2012 and Donald Trump in 2016.

=== The rise of negative partisanship ===
In today's society, partisanship in the United States has been transformed by two different trends. First, partisanship and ideological identity have become closely aligned. Democrats are overwhelmingly liberal, and Republicans are overwhelmingly conservative. This specific alignment strengthens the bonds between partisans and their political parties. The second trend that has transformed partisanship is the rise of negative partisanship. The American National Election Studies collected data for a feeling-thermometer scale to study the feelings of the people towards the parties. For the Democratic Party, the average rating went from 59 to 49 degrees from 2000 to 2016. On the other hand, there was a drop from 54 to 43 degrees from 2000 to 2016 for the Republican Party. Since the American National Election Studies created the feeling-thermometer scale in 1968, Donald Trump and Hillary Clinton have been the most unpopular major-party candidates.

==== The racial divide ====
The racial divide in the United States has been the most significant factor that has influenced the rise of negative partisanship. Negative political campaigns, partisan media, and diverse cultural issues have heightened tensions. The most significant factor in negative partisanship is racial alignment, which occurred in the beginning of the 1970s. During this time, Republican candidates would send out racially tinged messages in order to gain support from racially conservative White voters. This transformed the Republican Party into predominately White, while the Democratic Party was growing more diverse. This realignment was influenced by demographic changes and large-scale immigration. These things caused an increase in racial resentment among the White Republican voters, which created the racial divide between the two parties. People's racial attitudes have been significant in how voters view parties and candidates. We can see in recent years that White voters with high levels of racial resentment align with the Republican Party, while racially liberal White and non-White voters usually vote Democratic. This division has increased negative feelings towards the parties in modern-day politics.

==== The impact of the media ====
The advancement of technology and the media has strongly influenced negative partisanship. The rise of TV, radio, and internet news outlets has created a fragmented and polarized media landscape. This has enabled individuals to choose to watch ideologically aligned news sources that often depict the opposing party in a negative manner. For example, Republicans often watch Fox News, while Democrats can be seen watching CNN. Studies have shown that exposure to partisan media has a huge impact on voting behaviors. As these partisan media outlets continue to grow, they continue to create a divide between Democrats and Republicans, which will increase negative partisanship.

==== The influence of personalities ====
Even personality traits have an influence on negative partisanship. Utilizing the Big Five personality framework (Openness to New Experiences, Conscientiousness, Extraversion, Agreeableness, and Emotional Stability), scholars have made a connection between certain traits and the impact that they have on partisanship. The American National Election Studies revealed that higher levels of extraversion, agreeableness, and emotional stability are less likely to be negative partisans. People who are naturally friendly are less likely to have negativity towards the opposing party. Extraverts that are socially active have been shown to also be less likely to show negativity towards the other party due to the fact that they understand others. On the other hand, those who have lower levels of agreeableness, extraversion, and emotional stability are more likely to be negative partisans. Our personality traits can play a role in our feelings towards the opposing party.

== In other countries ==
In a comparative study of elections in Australia, Canada, New Zealand, and the United States, researchers from the Université de Montréal examined the relationship between group identity, political ideology, positive party identification, negative party identification, and vote choice. Under the traditional left–right political spectrum, negative partisanship is not an independent factor distinct from positive partisan identity, with psychologists John T. Cacioppo and Gary Berntson placing positive and negative attitudes on a single bipolar continuum. However, more recent scholarship has found that positive and negative identity are not merely opposites. According to Henri Tajfel, members of a group must first gain a positive sense of identity before they can associate negative feelings with an outgroup. But once negative feelings are established, they may produce a stronger reaction in the brain due to negativity bias.

The Montréal researchers concluded that group identities are acquired early in life and combine with ideology to determine positive party identification, but not negative party identification except in New Zealand. Under a logistic regression model with party identification and education as independent variables and vote choice as the dependent variable, both forms of party identification have a statistically significant impact on vote choice, while education is a significant determinant of vote choice for both parties only in the United States.
