= Political socialization =

Psychological process

Political socialization is the process by which individuals internalize and develop their political values, ideas, attitudes, and perceptions via the agents of socialization. Agents such as family, education, media, and peers influence the most in establishing varying political lenses that frame one's perception of political values, ideas, and attitudes. These perceptions, in turn, shape and define individuals' definitions of who they are and how they should behave in the political and economic institutions in which they live. This learning process shapes perceptions that influence which norms, behaviors, values, opinions, morals, and priorities will ultimately shape their political ideology: it is a "study of the developmental processes by which people of all ages and adolescents acquire political cognition, attitudes, and behaviors." Political socialization can be structured as primary and secondary socialization. Primary socialization agents include the family, whereas secondary socialization refers to agents outside the family. These agents expose individuals through varying degrees of influence, inducing them into the political culture and their orientations towards political objects. Throughout a lifetime, these experiences influence one's political identity and shape one's political outlook.

== Agents of socialization ==
Agents of socialization, sometimes called institutions, work together to influence and shape people's political norms and values. In the case of political socialization, the most significant agents include, but are not limited to, families, media, education, and peers. Other agents include religion, the state, and community. These agents shape the understanding of politics by exposing one to political ideas, values, and behaviors.

=== Family ===
Across the decades, literature has heavily emphasized that the agent of the family is the most influential, with literature suggesting that family and the transmission of attitudes from parent to child are the most prominent agents of socialization. This claim has found especially strong support for the transmission of voting behaviour, partisanship and religious attitudes. Especially in contexts of high politization and homogeneity in political views, transmissions are argued to be higher. Literature examines how aspects of family structures and dynamics change the varying influence of the offspring's values as a function of the distribution of their parent's attitudes. Families perpetuate values that support political authorities and can heavily contribute to children's initial political ideological views, or party affiliations. Literature suggest that the transmission of intergenerational political attitudes shows a strong lineage concerning their parents and siblings. Families have an effect on "political knowledge, identification, efficacy, and participation", depending on variables such as "family demographics, life cycle, parenting style, parental level of political cynicism", interest and politization, and "frequency of political discussions", as well as the saliency of the issues that are being discussed.

- Parents: Earliest literature of the influence of parents suggests that the varying ways parents raise their children become a significant catalyst in influencing their political attitudes, and behaviour. However, the initial view of parent-youth political socialisations studies of the simple inheritance of partisan views from parents to their children has been challenged by various studies, arguing that while the family still plays an important role in the political orientation of their offspring, the intensity is reduced over time and also taking other influential aspects into account. The most frequently found correlation of intergenerational transmission between parents and their children is partisanship and religious beliefs. What has been found is that especially salient and frequently discussed topics are more likely to transmit, and stronger transmissions occur in highly politicised households with homogenous views on political issues. It is further argued that the different methods of raising a child result in the child establishing formative values about all aspects of one's social life, such as religion and cultural traditions. . Especially the parenting style has been argued to be influential, with nurturant parenting resulting in more liberal views, and strict parenting promoting conservatism. This is argued to be due to a state-family heuristic, which assumes that complex phenomena such as politics and the state- society-relationship are understood from what we know from parent-child dynamics. In turn, suggesting that approaching social institutions in this context is vital as they bring a primary influence as opposed to economic or more formative organizations. Literature also suggest that prejudice influence from parents was found to be more influential towards political attitudes rather than economic and social stratification. Ultimately, literature has found it significant in studying the transmission of attitudes from parent to child as parents are generally more conservative, commonly associated with traditional attitudes and pushing towards continuity, opposite of their offspring.
- Siblings: The composition of the household in terms of the sex of the siblings has been argued to influence boys in becoming more or less conservative. What has been suggested is that for boys, having sisters influences them to develop more conservative views on gender roles and partisanship. This has been argued to be caused by a different approach to child raising and the division of household chores that varies in families depending if there are sons and daughters, or just sons. Therefore, if brothers do have sisters, they are less likely to be exposed to traditionally feminized household chores, wherefore they might adopt this view on gender roles and in turn also hold more traditional views in politics. Furthermore, literature suggests that children and adolescents are far more successfully socialized with cohort-centric attitudes with siblings close in age. Thus, this cohort-centric difference of multiple generations within the family with parents and siblings supports the idea that siblings who share the core agents of familial socialization develop coherent political attitudes. Linkage to the transmission of political attitudes via siblings include social trust and civic engagement.

=== Socioeconomic conditions ===
The household distributes civic resources unequally, which produces lasting differences in how much people take part in politics.

The resource model of participation holds that political activity depends on time, money and civic skills, which are spread unevenly across households. Civic skills are acquired early, at home and in the settings a family's position makes accessible, so household conditions shape participation before adulthood.

Longitudinal evidence connects childhood economic conditions to later turnout. Using the German Socio-Economic Panel, Weißenfels linked first-time voters aged 18 to 25 to information about their parents and followed turnout across four federal elections between 2009 and 2021, defining childhood poverty as living below the at-risk-of-poverty line before age 12. Turnout was lower among those who grew up poor, and each additional year of poverty deepened the effect. About 47 percent of respondents raised in poverty by low-educated parents voted, compared with about 80 percent of never-poor respondents with highly educated parents. Strong parental interest in politics removed this gap. Poverty that began early and persisted mattered most, and leaving poverty in adulthood did not raise participation.

The quality of family interaction shapes these effects. Using the 1996 National Household Education Survey, McIntosh, Hart and Youniss found that the frequency of parent–adolescent political discussion predicted news attention, political knowledge, communication skill and community service, and that the knowledge gain was larger when parents were themselves politically informed. Parental income, employment and homeownership had little direct effect on most outcomes, which indicates that economic resources work mainly through discussion and household stability.

Transmission within the family works relationally, not automatically. Drawing on the German Socio-Economic Panel and the British Household Panel Study, Zuckerman, Dasovic and Fitzgerald showed that partisanship is reproduced through everyday interaction and negotiation, so one household can produce children with different orientations depending on their relationship with each parent.

British panel data show when these gaps form. Janmaat and Hoskins found no difference in political interest or voting intention between children of more and less educated parents at age 11; the gap opened between ages 11 and 15 and then held into the mid-twenties. Parental political engagement, by contrast, already shaped voting intentions at age 11.

The evidence comes mainly from established Western democracies with strong welfare states, and much of the founding work is American. Causal identification stays difficult, because childhood poverty occurs together with lower parental education, residential instability and chronic stress, which makes it hard to isolate the channel that drives later participation.

=== Media ===
Mass media is not only a source of political information; it is an influence on political values and beliefs. The culmination of information gained from entertainment becomes the values and standards by which people judge. Most people choose what media they are exposed to based on their already existing values, and they use information from the media to reaffirm what they already believe. From news coverage and late-night programs, to exposure to social media apps, present varying political stances that are often associated with increasing political participation. However literature suggests that media coverage increasingly motivates users to delve into politics, as media outlets are leaning toward what stories will get them more views and engagement. In turn, suggesting that having more political motives and financial motives presents more partisanship polarization if it means they will have an increase in viewership. These reinforced segments that bring more viewership have been proven to be more likely for individuals to rewatch or pay for reinforcing congruent evidence, suggesting that reinforced media segments become confirmatory evidence that continuously polarizes biased political information. This has become the perfect environment to enhance partisan polarization among voters through national outlets that reinforce extremist positions. These extremist positions have consistently found their way into partisan positions that have moved both parties towards supporting more extremist values, increasing mass partisan polarization. Ultimately, however, the common core of information, and the interpretation the media applies to it, leads to a shared knowledge and basic values throughout a given entity. Most media entertainment and information does not vary much throughout the country, and it is consumed by all types of audiences. Although there are still disagreements and different political beliefs and party affiliations, generally there are not huge ideological disparities among the population because the media helps create a broad consensus on basic US democratic principles.Overall, the increase in the media market demand for viewership has encouraged more polarized political discourse, and with advancing technologies, our dependency on the Internet and the media's vulnerability will only continue increasing. In turn, making it more vital in addressing the threat misinformation holds to the integrity of democracy.

- Print Media: In the case of print media, it is the oldest form of political socialization of media, as this includes books, poems and newspapers. Until 1900, after the invention of radio, print media was the primary way individuals received information that shaped their political attitudes and beliefs. Studies show two-thirds of newspaper readers do not know their newspaper's position on specific issues- and most media stories are quickly forgotten. Older people read more newspapers than younger people, and people from the ages of twelve to seventeen (although they consume the most media) consume the least amount of news.
- Broadcast Media: Media influence in political socialization continues with both fictional and factual media sources. Adults have increased exposure to news and political information embedded in entertainment; fictional entertainment (mostly television) is the most common source of political information. The most common form of broadcast media is television and radio, increasing attention to politics as people become more informed with information and beliefs shaping political attitudes. Studies on public opinion of the Bush administration's energy policies show that the public pays more attention to issues that receive a lot of media coverage and form collective opinions about these issues. This demonstrates that the mass media's attention to an issue affects public opinion. More so, extensive exposure to television has led to "mainstreaming," aligning people's perception of political life and society with television's portrayal of it.
- Digital Media: Digital media, such as YouTube, Vimeo, and Twitch, accounted for viewership rates of 27.9 billion hours in 2020. examples of digital media include content created, distributed, and viewed on a given platform that one views from a digital electronic device. In turn, increases political polarization, with the recommended algorithms that confine users to echo chambers and content they agree with and enjoy while also increasing their political polarization.
- Social Media: The role of social media in political socialization, from scrolling on TikTok to checking the trending page on Twitter, has increasingly become powerful in presenting news and varying political perspectives. This shows political socialization at the palm of your hand with the constant production of new content, bringing a new variable in its infancy and shaping how people establish their political beliefs. The media has significantly increased the number of users who cover relevant political information, increasing exposure to political discourse. These platforms have created the perfect environment for individuals to be presented with and reinforce their beliefs through the advancing programming of echo chambers. Algorithms are increasingly confining users in a cycle of content-related videos. This gives media outlets an increasing power to manipulate biased presented news as supporting evidence to a partisan issue, reinforcing confirmatory information to potential false realities shaped by misinformation. Exposure to political accountability through the media motivates increasing polarization as it exposes how potential candidates stand on a given issue.

=== Education ===
In the numerous years in school, through primary, secondary, and high schools, students are taught vital political principles such as voting, elected representatives, individual rights, personal responsibility, and the political history of their state and country. There is also evidence that education is a significant factor in establishing political attitudes during the crucial period of adolescence, with three central themes examining how civic courses, teachers, and peer groups often provide alternative perspectives to their parent's political attitudes. In turn, identifying that civic influences towards change in an educational setting are vital in establishing generational political differences during socialization during adolescence. Other literature has found that involvement with high school activities provides adolescents with direct experience with political and civic engagement and implementing activist orientations toward one's attitudes with increased political discourse.

=== Religion ===
Religious beliefs and practices influence political opinions, priorities, and political participation. The theological and moral perspectives offered by religious institutions shape judgment regarding political attitudes and, ultimately, translate to direct influence on political matters such as "the redistribution of wealth, equality, tolerance for deviance, individual freedom, the severity of criminal punishment, policies relating to family structure, gender roles, abortion, anti-gay rhetoric, and the value of human life."

=== The State ===
State governments can control mass media to "inform, misinform, or misinform the press and thus the public '', a strategy referred to as propaganda. The ability to control agents of socialization, such as the media, brings control to the state to serve a political, economic, or personal agenda that benefits the state.

=== Community ===
Community mobilization brings significant experiences of political socialization events that could influence one's political attitudes with a collective community goal. An example is how Prop 187 was specifically targeting illegal immigrants in LA County within the state of California. Given the severity of the policy targeting a specific community, this created a mass mobilization of the Latino and immigrant community, creating a voting bloc that prevented the initiative of Prop 187. Harvey Milk was a significant political mobilizing the queer community during the 1978 race for California governor with increasing support for Prop 6, a law that would mandate firing any queer teacher or employee in any California public school. As this threatened the queer community and increased immigration of gay, lesbian, and transgender individuals, specifically in the San Francisco area, Milk was able to mobilize the queer community to gain enough momentum to vote against Prop 6 successfully. This could have been a pivotal introduction to political participation for those in these areas, motivating many to continue voting in future elections. In many cases, the experience of community mobilization is the first introduction to political policies and political participation, starting their political journey connected with their home. This also applies to conditions and situations prevailing in other parts of the world.

=== Region ===
Geographical location also plays a role in one's political media socialization. For example, news outlets on the East Coast tend to cover international affairs in Europe and the Middle East the most, while West Coast news outlets are more likely to cover Asian affairs; this demonstrates that community region affects patterns in political socialization. The region is also significant for specific political attitudes. Living near the Pakistan-India and India - Bangladesh borders, an individual will likely have solid political attitudes toward the India - Bangladesh and Pakistan-India tensions. Given the socialization of their parents, cousins, grandparents, peers, and education, all have a significant role in teaching their youth about the relationship one has with the other state. Suppose one immigrated from Cuba to the United States. In that case, they will be the political socialization inclination to obtain conservative attitudes in the United States because of the regional movements from a leftist government in Cuba.

== Life Stages of Political Socialization ==
=== Childhood ===
Political socialization begins in childhood. It has been found that family is the first main influence, and following social circles are often chosen based on these initial views. Therefore, views are assumed to persist. Research suggest that family and educational environment are the most influential factors in socializing children. In terms of family, in early childhood, indirect exposure, such as parenting styles, or sibling composition might be more relevant, than direct political discussions. However recent literature suggest that increasing influence is coming from mass media such as digital and social media. On average, both young children and teenagers in the United States spend more time a week consuming television and digital media than they spend in school. Young children consume an average of thirty-one hours a week, while teenagers consume forty-eight hours of media a week. Given that childhood is when a human is the most impressionable the influential of agents of socialization is significant as children's brains are "prime for learning", thus more likely to take messages of political attitudes of the world at face value.

=== Adolescence ===
With media influence carrying into adolescence, high school students attribute the information that forms their opinions and attitudes about race, war, economics, and patriotism to mass media much more than their friends, family, or teachers. Other literature suggests that political identification and political participation often stem from values and attitudes attained during one's adolescence. The literature argues that pre-adult socialization in both childhood and adolescence has a longstanding and stable catalyzing influence from political events. This political socialization of these catalytic events establishes predispositions that are often felt by mass and collective political socialization. Literature also suggests that adult political participation shows a longitudinal influence from adolescent forces of political socialization, with three models assessing the effects of parental influence in the context of socioeconomic status, political activity, and civic orientation. A decade later, this literature observed a longitudinal impact of socialization that stems from adolescent political socialization. Literature found that parents' socioeconomic status and high school activities impact the most, although the family is an important and stable agent of socialisation, especially if views and stances are consistent, stable, clear, salient and frequently communicated, which favours higher transmission rates. Primary carriers of pre-adult political socialization play a crucial role in later political participation, with the parent political participation model contributing to an understanding of political activity. This literature suggests that political socialization during the adolescent period significantly influences political participation and voting behavior. It is argued that views persist when the initial socialisation in the family has been strong, hence views have been strongly formed when the adolescents enter adulthood.

=== Adulthood ===
While political socialization is lifelong process, after adolescence, people's basic values generally do not change. Most people choose what content they are exposed to based on their already existing values, and they use information from a favorable source to simply reaffirm what they already believe. Internal outcomes during adulthood can have far more significant development if these beliefs remain constant over time, especially if an attitude is present for the remainder of one's adolescence, the odds of that belief being consistent during adulthood are very likely.

== See also ==
- Agency (sociology)
- Cohort effect
- Groupthink
- Political culture
- Political cognition
- Public opinion
