= Rachel Bitecofer =

American political scientist (born 1977)

- Born: 1977 (age 48–49)
- Education: University of Oregon (BA); University of Georgia (MA, PhD)

Rachel Bitecofer (born 1977) is an American political scientist and election forecaster.

== Early life and career ==
Bitecofer has a bachelor's degree in political science from the University of Oregon and a Ph.D. in political science and international affairs from the University of Georgia. In 2015 she became a lecturer at Christopher Newport University and assistant director of the Wason Center for Public Policy, where she conducted polling. She left Christopher Newport University in 2019 and joined the Niskanen Center, a centrist think tank in Washington, D.C.

== Election punditry ==
Bitecofer's analysis has appeared on multiple media platforms including MSNBC and the New York Times. She wrote the 2017 book, The Unprecedented 2016 Presidential Election, on the election of Donald Trump and runs a podcast hosted by Substack titled The Election Whisperer. She runs Strike Pac, a liberal super PAC.

Bitecofer accurately predicted the size of the "Blue Wave" in the 2018 United States midterm elections earlier than other forecasters, projecting that Democrats would gain 42 U.S. House seats in the election; they gained 41 seats. She also advanced the theory that Trump would lose reelection in 2020. Bitecofer argued that the 2020 electorate would see the return of voters who were unmotivated to vote in 2016.

Bitecofer has argued that differential turnout has an increasing role in elections. This view has been criticized by other political analysts like David Wasserman of The Cook Political Report, with others such as Kyle Kondik of The Crystal Ball and Sam Wang offering more support.

She has also argued against Democrats nominating moderate "Blue Dog" candidates, pointing to liberal candidates Stacey Abrams and Beto O'Rourke losing their elections in 2018 by fairly narrow margins.

== Electoral theory and forecasting ==
Bitecofer is best known for her applied framework built around the political science concept of negative partisanship. While negative partisanship has been widely studied in academic literature, Bitecofer developed a campaign strategy based on it, arguing that elections can be shaped through consistent, emotionally resonant conflict-based messaging that both mobilizes partisan voters and pushes swing voters away from the party in power. In January 2019, she published an opinion essay in The New York Times titled “Why Trump Will Lose in 2020.” In the piece, published approximately 21 months before Election Day, she argued that President Donald Trump would face a structural backlash typical of midterm and presidential cycles involving unpopular incumbents. She contended that negative partisanship would both intensify Democratic turnout and cause swing voters to break against the incumbent party, increasing the likelihood of a Democratic victory in the presidential election.

Her forecasting work has generated debate within political science and campaign circles, particularly regarding the relative roles of turnout, backlash, and persuasion in modern elections.

== Publications and commentary ==
Bitecofer has authored two books on U.S. elections and political strategy.

Her first book, The Unprecedented 2016 Presidential Election (2018), provides an academic analysis of the structural and strategic factors in the 2016 presidential race.

In 2024, she co-authored Hit 'Em Where It Hurts: How to Save Democracy by Beating Republicans at Their Own Game with Aaron Murphy. The book advocates for Democrats to adopt conflict-based messaging rooted in negative partisanship to counter Republican tactics and mobilize voters.

Bitecofer has published peer-reviewed academic articles and book chapters on topics including polarization, voter evaluations of Supreme Court nominees, sexism in presidential elections, democratic accountability, and negative partisanship.

She has contributed opinion pieces and been featured in major outlets such as The New York Times, The Washington Post, Politico, and MSNBC.
