= Donald E. Stokes =

American political scientist

- Born: April 1, 1927; Philadelphia, Pennsylvania
- Died: January 26, 1997 (aged 69); Philadelphia, Pennsylvania
- Education: Princeton University; Yale University
- Awards: Elmer B. Staats Award; APSA Woodrow Wilson Prize
- Scientific career
- Fields: Political science
- Workplaces: University of Michigan; Princeton University

Donald E. Stokes (1 April 1927 – 26 January 1997) was an American political scientist and dean of the Woodrow Wilson School of Public and International Affairs. Stokes was a founder of public opinion research, and a coauthor of the seminal book The American Voter.

== Early life and education ==
Stokes was born in Philadelphia, Pennsylvania on April 1, 1927. He obtained a bachelor's degree from Princeton University in 1951, and a PhD from Yale University in 1958.

== Career ==
Stokes began to work at the University of Michigan in 1958. There he collaborated with fellow University of Michigan social scientists Angus Campbell, Philip Converse, and Warren Miller to write The American Voter, which was one of the first major empirical studies of voting behavior. Through thousands of interviews with American citizens during the election periods in 1948, 1952, 1954, 1956 and 1958, the authors first identified several of the core results in voting behavior that would form the Michigan model. These include the importance of party identification, the low information level of many voters, and the large number of voters who remain undecided until immediately before an election.

In 1966, Campbell, Converse, Miller, and Stokes followed The American Voter with another book, Elections and the Political Order. Stokes studied the politics of the United Kingdom as well as American politics; he and David Butler conducted the first British Election Study, and coauthored the 1969 book Political Change in Britain.

In 1971, Stokes became the dean of the Horace H. Rackham School of Graduate Studies at the University of Michigan. He held that position until 1974, when he moved to Princeton University. At Princeton, he became the dean of the Woodrow Wilson School of Public and International Affairs, which expanded significantly under his oversight.

Towards the end of his career, Stokes published the book Pasteur's Quadrant, which studied the connection between basic science, applied science, and government policies.

Stokes is one of the most cited political scientists of all time, and is widely regarded as a founding scholar in the empirical study of political behavior. Harold Tafler Shapiro, who was president of the University of Michigan and then of Princeton University, called Stokes "a pioneer in the development of modern political science".
