= Pasteur's quadrant =

Classification of scientific research projects

Pasteur's quadrant is a classification of scientific research projects that seek fundamental understanding of scientific problems, while also having immediate use for society. Louis Pasteur's research is thought to exemplify this type of method, which bridges the gap between "basic" and "applied" research. The term was introduced by Donald E. Stokes in his book, Pasteur's Quadrant.

== Other quadrants ==
As shown in the following table, scientific research can be classified by whether it advances human knowledge by seeking a fundamental understanding of nature, or whether it is primarily motivated by the need to solve immediate problems.

Applied and Basic research
		Considerations of use?	
		No	Yes
Quest for fundamental understanding?	Yes	Pure basic research	Use-inspired basic research
Quest for fundamental understanding?	No	–	Pure applied research

The result is three distinct classes of research:

1. Pure basic research, exemplified by the work of Niels Bohr, early 20th century atomic physicist.
2. Pure applied research, exemplified by the work of Thomas Edison, inventor.
3. Use-inspired basic research, described here as "Pasteur's Quadrant".

== Usage ==
Pasteur's quadrant is useful in distinguishing various perspectives within science, engineering and technology. For example, Daniel A. Vallero and Trevor M. Letcher in their book Unraveling Environmental Disasters applied the device to disaster preparedness and response. University science programs are concerned with knowledge-building, whereas engineering programs at the same university will apply existing and emerging knowledge to address specific technical problems. Governmental agencies employ the knowledge from both to solve societal problems. Thus, the U.S. Army Corps of Engineers expects its engineers to apply general scientific principles to design and upgrade flood control systems. This entails selecting the best levee designs for the hydrologic conditions. However, the engineer would also be interested in more basic science to enhance designs in terms of water retention and soil strength. The university scientist is much like Bohr, with the major motivation being new knowledge. The governmental engineer is behaving like Edison, with the greatest interest in utility, and considerably less interest in knowledge for knowledge's sake.

The university engineering researcher's interests on the other hand, may fall between Bohr and Edison, looking to enhance both knowledge and utility. It is not likely that many single individuals fall within the Pasteur cell, since both basic and applied science are highly specialized. Thus, modern science and technology employ what might be considered a systems engineering approach, where the Pasteur cell consists of numerous researchers, professionals and practitioners to optimize solutions. Note that modifications to the quadrant model to more precisely reflect how research and development interact continue to be suggested.
