= Partisan (politics) =

Committed supporter of a political party or belief

A partisan (also spelled partizan) is a committed member or supporter of a political party or political movement. In multi-party systems, the term is used for persons who strongly support their party's policies and are reluctant to compromise with political opponents.

== United States ==
The term's meaning has changed dramatically over the last 60 years in the United States. Before the American National Election Study (described in Angus Campbell et al., in The American Voter) began in 1952, an individual's partisan tendencies were typically determined by their voting behaviour. Since then, "partisan" has come to refer to an individual with a psychological identification with one or the other of the major parties. Depending on their political beliefs, candidates may join a party. As they build the framework for career advancement, parties are more often than not the preferred choice for candidates. There are many parties in a system, and candidates often join them instead of standing as an Independent if that is provided for.

In the U.S., politicians have generally been identified with a party. Many local elections in the U.S. (as for mayor) are "nonpartisan." A candidate may have a party affiliation, but it is not listed on the ballot. Independents occasionally appear in significant contests but rarely win. At the presidential level, the best independent vote getters were Ross Perot in 1992 and 1996, and John B. Anderson in 1980.

President Dwight D. Eisenhower was nonpartisan until 1952, when he joined the Republican Party and was elected president. According to David A. Crockett, "Much of Eisenhower's nonpartisan image was genuine, for he found Truman's campaigning distasteful and inappropriate, and he disliked the partisan aspects of campaigning." With little interest in routine partisanship, Eisenhower left much of the building and sustaining of the Republican Party to his vice president, Richard Nixon. Paul Finkelman and Peter Wallenstein state, "With Eisenhower uninvolved in party building, Nixon became the de facto national GOP leader."

Eisenhower's largely nonpartisan stance allowed him to work smoothly with the Democratic leader's Speaker Sam Rayburn in the House and Majority Leader Lyndon Johnson in the Senate. Jean Smith says:

Ike, LBJ, and "Mr. Sam" did not trust one another completely and they did not see eye to eye on every issue, but they understood one another and had no difficulty working together. Eisenhower continued to meet regularly with the Republican leadership. But his weekly sessions with Rayburn and Johnson, usually in the evening, over drinks, were far more productive. For Johnson and Rayburn, it was shrewd politics to cooperate with Ike. Eisenhower was wildly popular in the country. ... By supporting a Republican president against the Old Guard of his own party, the Democrats hoped to share Ike's popularity.

== Marxism–Leninism ==
"Party spirit" is a term originated in Marxism–Leninism. It is translated as Dangxing (Chinese: 党性) in Chinese, Partiinost (партийность) in Russian and Parteilichkeit in German. It can be variously translated as party-mindedness, partisanship, or party spirit. The term can refer to both a philosophical position concerning the sociology of knowledge and an official doctrine of public intellectual life in the Soviet Union. The term may also mean the membership of a person in a certain political party.

An example of how the concept of the party spirit translates to party partisanship and how it was embedded and institutionalised in state structures is seen in Article 6 of the 1977 Soviet Constitution. This formalised the Communist Party of the Soviet Union (CPSU) as the "leading and guiding force of Soviet society and the nucleus of its political system, of all state organizations and public organizations."

== Research ==
Partisanship causes survey respondents to answer political surveys differently, even if the survey asks a question with an objective answer. People with strong partisan beliefs are 12% more likely to give an incorrect answer that benefits their preferred party than an incorrect answer that benefits another party. This is due to the phenomenon of motivated reasoning, of which there are several types, including "cheerleading" and congenial inference. Motivated reasoning means that a partisan survey respondent may feel motivated to answer the survey in a way that they know is incorrect; when the respondent is uncertain of an answer, partisanship may also motivate them to guess or predict an answer that favorable to their party. Studies have found that offering a cash incentive for correct answers reduces partisan bias in responses by about 50%, from 12–15% to about 6%.

== See also ==
- Party identification
- Bipartisanship
- Macropartisanship
- Negative partisanship
- Nonpartisan
- Partisan (disambiguation)
- Political faction
- Political polarization
- Sectarianism
- Cook Partisan Voting Index
- Tribalism
- Truthiness
- Political psychology
- Open-mindedness
