= Voting behavior =

How voters decide how to vote

Voting behavior refers to how people decide how to vote. This decision is shaped by a complex interplay between an individual voter's attitudes as well as social factors. Voter attitudes include characteristics such as ideological predisposition, party identity, degree of satisfaction with the existing government, public policy leanings, and feelings about a candidate's personality traits. Social factors include race, religion and degree of religiosity, social and economic class, educational level, regional characteristics, gender and age.

The degree to which a person identifies with a political party influences voting behavior, as does social identity.

Voter decision-making is not a purely rational endeavor but rather is profoundly influenced by personal and social biases and deeply held beliefs as well as characteristics such as personality, memory, emotions, and other psychological factors. Voting advice applications and avoidance of wasted votes through strategic voting can impact voting behavior.

== Types ==
Citizens are not blank slates- they have pre existing political habits that affect how likely they are to vote, and pre existing political identities that affect whether they will vote for Democratic or Republican candidates. Voter behavior is often influenced by voter loyalty. There is a correlation between voter satisfaction with what a political party has achieved and dealt with a situation and voters' intention of voting for the same party again. Thus, if there is high voter satisfaction with how the political party performed, then the likelihood of a reoccurring vote in the next election is high. Additionally, the information supplied to the voter is significant in understanding voting behavior. The information provided to the voter, not only influences who to vote for, but if they are intending to at all.

=== Influence of cleavages ===
Three cleavage-based voting factors, or individual differences impacting voting behavior, focused on in existing research are religion, class, and gender. In recent years, voting cleavage has shifted from concerns of Protestant vs Catholic religions to have a larger focus on religious vs non-religious leanings. Research shows that citizens vote for the candidate that they believe is most compatible with their moral convictions and religious values. Traditional conceptions of class voting dictate a working-class preference towards left-leaning parties and middle-class preference for right-leaning parties. The influences of class voting is reliant on political environment and location; many nations observe the opposite preferences.

Many cleavage-based voting behaviors are interconnected and frequently build on each other. These factors also tend to hold different levels of weight in different countries, based on their political environment, meaning that there is no universal explanation for voting cleavage in all democratic countries. Each factor has a different level of importance and influence on one's vote dependent on the country one is voting in.

=== Election dependency ===
Research following the Cypriot Referendum of 2004 identified four distinct voting behaviors depending on the election type. Citizens use different decision criteria if they are called to exercise their right to vote in presidential, legislative, local elections or in a referendum.

In national elections, voters usually vote based on their political ideologies. In local and regional elections, voters tend to vote for those who seem more capable to contribute to their area. Voting behavior for referendums differs slightly, as people vote for or against a clearly defined policy.

=== Partisanship ===
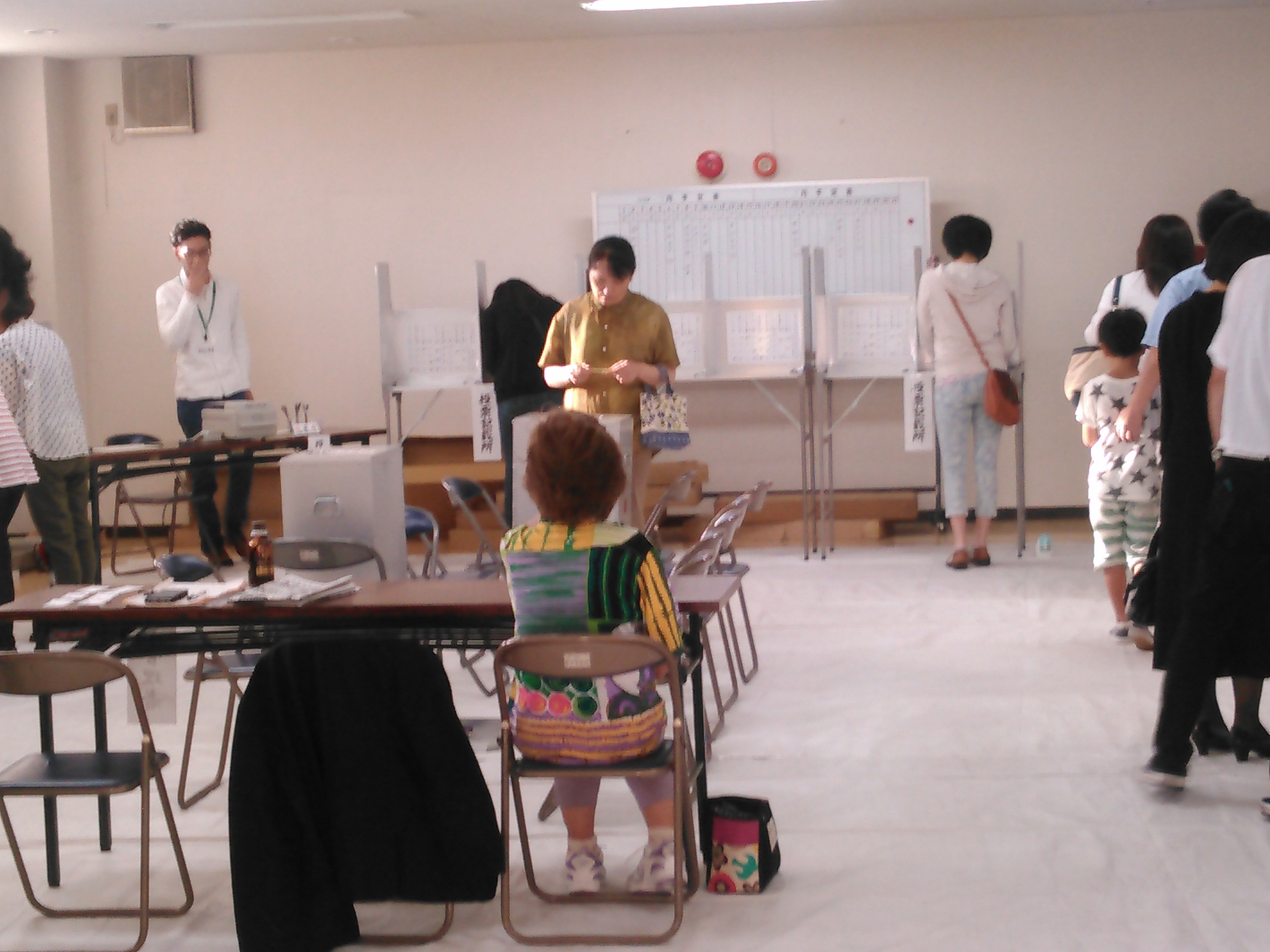
2016 Election in Japan; A 1960 study of postwar Japan found that citizens living in urban areas were more likely to be supportive of socialist or progressive parties, while citizens living in rural areas were favorable of conservative parties.

Partisan voting is also an important motive behind an individual's vote and can influence voting behavior. A 2000 research study on partisanship voting in the United States found evidence that partisan voting has a large effect on voting behavior. However, partisan voting has a larger effect on national elections, such as a presidential election, than it does on congressional elections. Furthermore, there is also a distinction of partisan voting behavior relative to a voter's age and education. Studies show that individuals with more educational attainment are more likely to vote. Those over fifty years old and those without a high school diploma are more likely to vote based on partisan loyalty. Research also suggests that those with higher levels of education may prefer liberal policies. Additionally, the voting behavior tendencies of different groups may shift over time; for example, in the United States, voters with college degrees have shifted significantly toward Democratic Party candidates over the past three decades. This research is based on the United States and has not been confirmed to accurately predict voting patterns in other democracies.

Research has shown that income is a significant factor that influences voting decision- higher income individuals are more likely to vote for a conservative party Conversely, lower income individuals may support left leaning parties as they may perceive these policies to be aligned with reducing social disparity.

A 1960 study of Postwar Japan found that citizens living in urban areas were more likely to be supportive of socialist or progressive parties, while citizens living in rural areas were favorable of conservative parties.

Voters have also been shown to be affected by coalition and alliance politics, and whether such coalitions form before or after an election. In these cases, voters can be swayed by feelings on coalition partners when considering their feelings toward their preferred political party.

== Gender differences ==
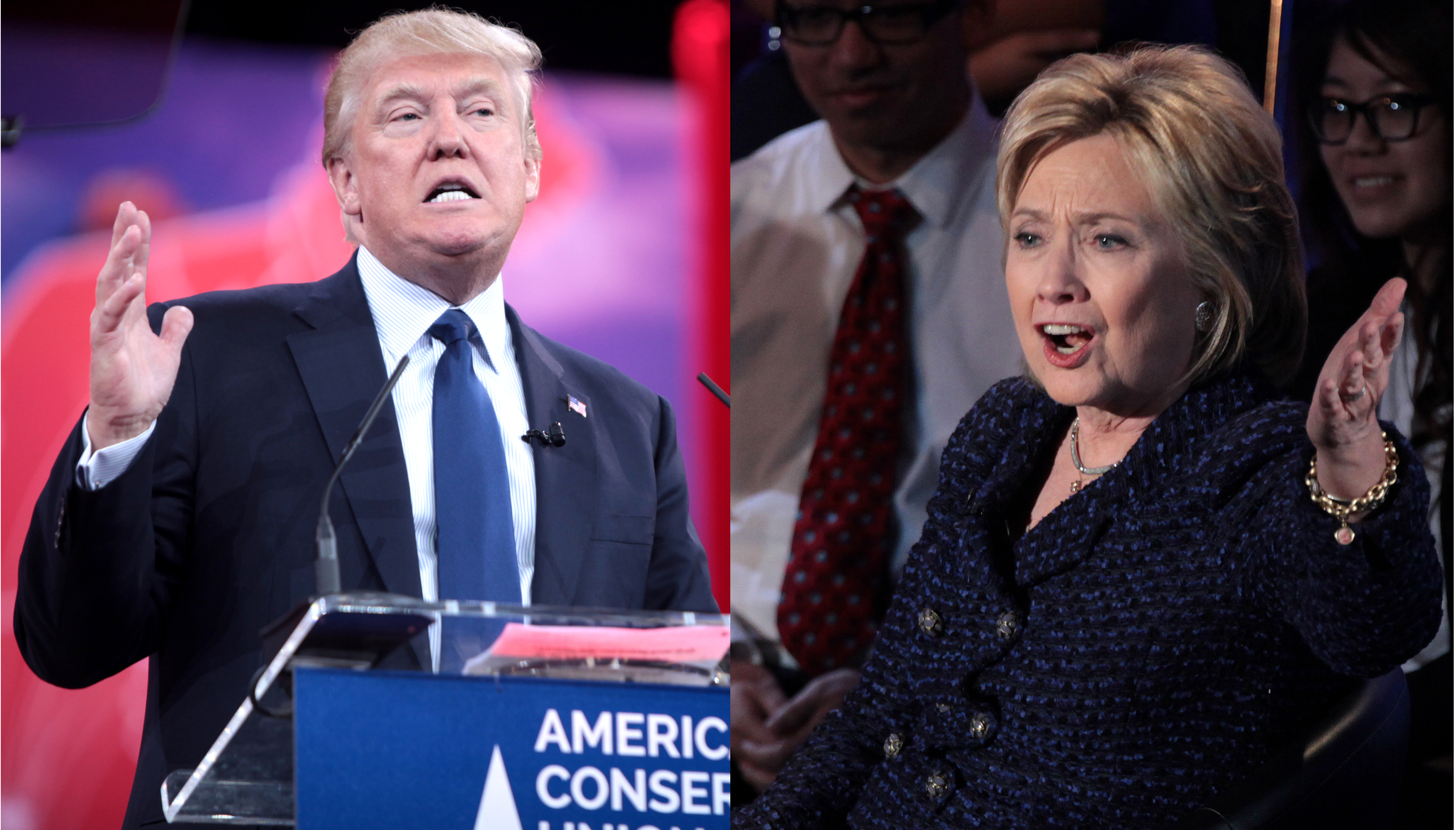
In 2016, a higher percentage of White women in the United States voted more for Donald Trump over Hillary Clinton.

Gender is an important factor to consider when making inferences regarding voting behavior. Gender often interacts with factors such as region, race, occupational differences, age, ethnicity, educational level, and other characteristics to produce a distinct multiplicative effect on voting behavior. Much of the research on gender differences in voting behavior has centered on the gender gap and party realignment of women in the United States towards the Democratic Party in the 1980s. More recent research focusing on the partisan gender gap in the United States suggests that this gender gap is actually a race gap, as White women in the U.S. have consistently been supporters of the Republican Party and were more likely to vote for Donald Trump over Hillary Clinton in the 2016 Presidential Election. Research shows that women's political attitudes may align with more progressive and left leaning policies- women may prioritize issues such as healthcare, education, and gender equality. Conversely, men may value right leaning parties as they may prioritize issues such as national security, economic growth, and traditional values that the conservative party upholds. More recent and forthcoming research expands this focus to a global perspective, using cross-national perceptions of gender differences in voting behavior to make predictions that factor in the role of gender in voting decisions.

=== Historical and global perspective ===
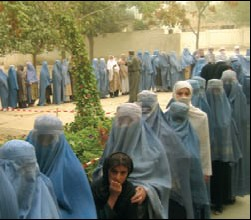
Afghan women voting in the 2004 Presidential Election; under Taliban rule, women are not allowed to travel more than 72 kilometers without a male chaperone which creates a voting obstacle.

In the modern era, New Zealand was the first nation to grant women the legal right to vote, in 1893. The vast majority of nations officially granted women the right to vote over the past century, though many women were prevented from voting for decades, such as Black women in many regions of the United States. prior to the 1960s. As of 2023, virtually all nations other than Vatican City officially grant women the legal right to vote, though significant barriers exist to women's suffrage in many places that can make casting a ballot impossible or near impossible. Examples include Afghanistan, where women are not allowed to travel more than 72 kilometers without a male chaperone, and parts of Kenya, where many women could not vote in recent elections due to election-related sexual violence.

Research on gender differences in voting has historically focused on economically advanced, western-style democracies, though there is a growing body of research on women's voting preferences in lower income nations. Research has demonstrated that gender differences in voting exist worldwide. The cause of this gender gap often varies by country and region. Frequently utilized explanations for gender gaps in voting are socioeconomic factors, situational constraints for women, and differences in political priorities. Studies indicate that the way these factors interact with voting behavior depends on location, cultural norms, literacy level, lived experience, and other facets of identity including race, ethnicity, and age. It is thus important to employ an intersectional lens - meaning, one in which race, ethnicity, economic status, sexual identity, educational status, and other factors are considered - and explore gender within the context of these other factors to understand voting behavior more fully.

=== Gendered influence on sources of individual voting behavior ===
Influences on candidate choice have been linked to three main influences on voting behavior. These influences include, but are not limited to, issue and public policy beliefs, perceptions of government performance, and personal evaluation of candidate characteristics. These factors are influenced by a range of compounding factors including gender.

==== Issue and public policy beliefs ====
Voters must hold opinions on the subject and recognize differences between the candidates on it in order for it to influence their choice of candidate. Oftentimes, voters will hold viewpoints that are too unstable to serve as a benchmark for comparing the candidates, while others won't detect any significant distinctions between them on the subject. Other voters will have firm opinions and distinct perceptions of candidate differences, specifically when the candidates directly indicate their distinctions. Relating back to voting behavior, the crucial point is not whether voters have a specific candidate or policy choice, but rather how much they differentiate between candidates on policy matters and decide who to vote for on that basis.

Partisan ideology influences these views on policy. In the United States, ideology affects how voters cast their ballots in presidential elections based on their beliefs on certain policy concerns. Another method of influence is party identification, which working with ideology may also shape the ways in which voters perceive policy.

===== Gender gap in partisan preferences =====
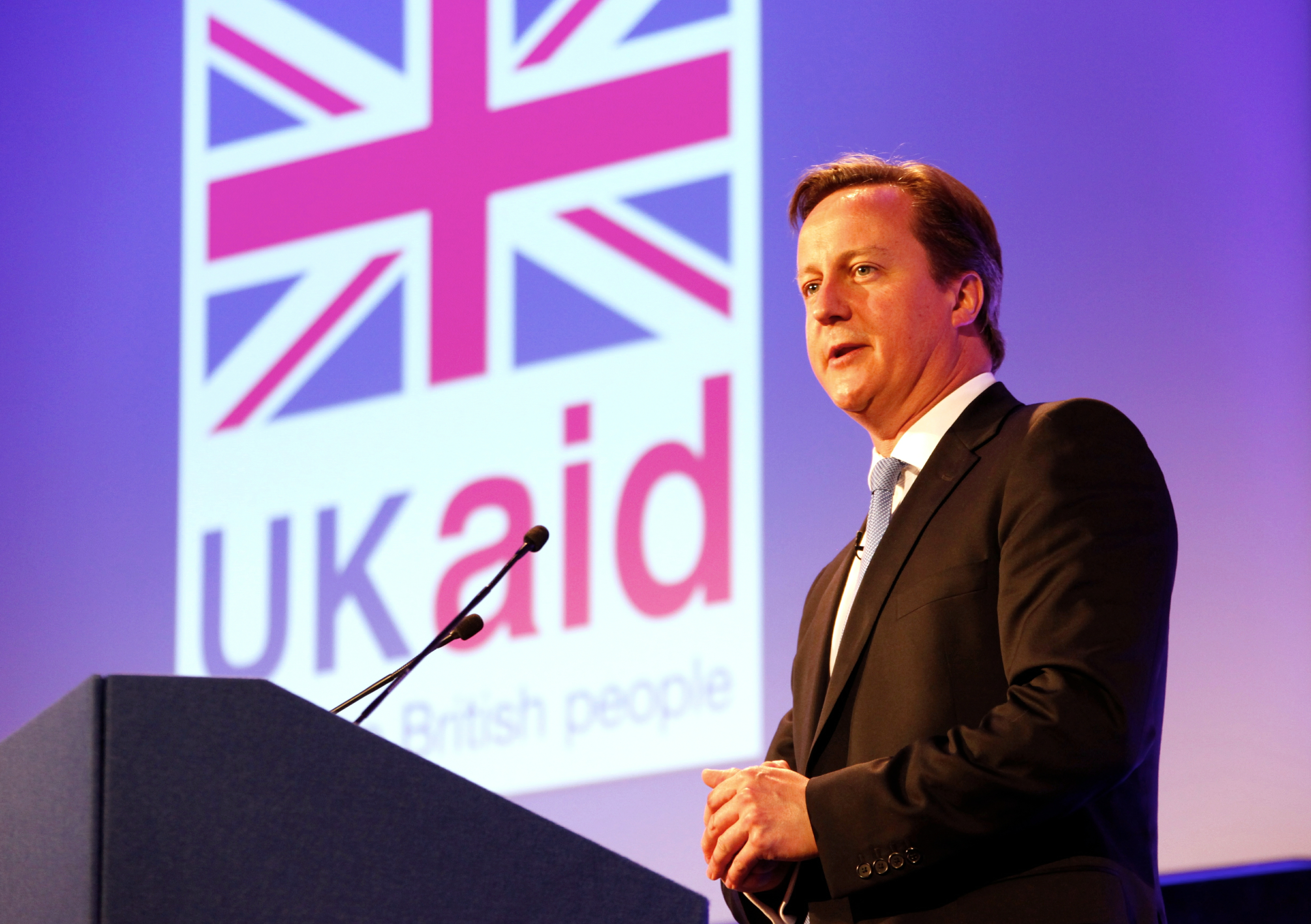
Former U.K. Prime Minister David Cameron at the London Summit on Family Planning; the U.K Conservative Party under David Cameron between 1997 and 2010, had more success winning votes from younger women as they addressed issues like government funded family planning.

There is mixed research regarding whether or not a gender gap in partisan preferences exists, and if it does exist to what extent. Research that affirms the existence of this gap emphasizes that younger women in particular are more likely to support progressive left-leaning candidates than men. The cause of this shift is still being explored, but one prevalent theory holds that gendered differences in voting behavior can at least in part be attributed to the growing presence of women in the workforce due to structural reform, improved accessibility of women to the education system, the questioning of traditional gender roles, and the disproportionate amount of unpaid caregiving work that women perform. These developments have led younger women to be more supportive of left-leaning political parties that tend to prioritize issues especially salient to women.

A relevant example to this point are right-leaning parties that have addressed relevant economic issues such as state-funded childcare, such as the U.K Conservative Party under David Cameron between 1997 and 2010, have since had more success winning votes from younger women.

==== Perceptions of government performance ====
Voting behavior is significantly influenced by retrospective assessments of government performance, which should be differentiated from the influence of policy issues. Different opinions on what the government ought to do are involved in policy concerns, which are prospective or based on what will happen. Performance assessments, which are retrospective, contain differences regarding how effectively the government has performed.

Legislator and voter gender can affect voter perceptions of government performance. A 2019 study surveying a nationally representative sample of United States citizens, found that women's equal representation in political-decision-making bodies builds trust and broad approval of these bodies across policy outcomes and areas.

==== Personal evaluations of candidates ====
Voters frequently weigh candidates' personal qualities such as experience, integrity, morals, compassion, competence, and leadership potential.

These established opinions of candidates' traits are developed in addition to how they view them in terms of political and policy issues, and these judgments have a significant impact on voting decisions. The candidates' perceived competence, concern, sincerity, dependability, and leadership ability have been found to be one crucial feature of their personal character. Which qualities matter and how these perceptions are formed is intertwined with a variety of identity factors including gender.

==== Gender bias in voting ====
Historically, political power has been disproportionately held by men. This unrepresentative balance is still reflected today with the vast majority of the highest political offices occupied by men. This trend holds even in democracies where political positions are technically accessible to all genders. This disparity is a product of a multitude of factors, but some suggest that the gender bias of voters plays a role in maintaining this political gender gap.

Physical characteristics of political candidates impact voter bias in a uniquely gendered way. A study from 2008 found that men are more likely to vote for attractive female candidates whereas women are more likely to vote for approachable male candidates. This finding echoes the different standards women candidates are required to fulfill in contrast to male candidates to be taken seriously as contenders in political races.

Research also indicates that the gender of a political candidate changes the way voters evaluate political qualifications. What voters want to know about a candidate varies by the candidate's gender. For female candidates, voters seek out more competence-related information like education level and occupational experience than they do for male candidates. Thus, the information voters seek about candidates is gendered in a way that indirectly impacts voting behavior. There is an overall bias that suggests that voters are using the candidates gender to make assumptions about political factors that are relatively closer to their own. Some female voters naturally feel that women will untimely connect and understand their beliefs.

There is also evidence that the presence of a female candidate encourages political engagement in voting. The mere presence of a female candidate has been found to increase women's voter turnout rate. This finding supports the idea that the descriptive representation of women in campaigns impacts the overall political attitudes and voting behavior of women.

=== Additional considerations ===
==== Gender differences in political engagement ====
Gender differences in voting behavior are components of gendered differences in political engagement. Political engagement refers to methods of individual involvement with political practices and can be broken down into conventional political engagement and unconventional political engagement. Conventional practices include voting, letter-writing, and signing petitions. Unconventional practices include participating in non-violent and violent protest, strikes, and picketing.

Numerous cross-national studies have found that women are less likely to engage in political engagement practices broadly. This means that women are less likely to engage in the practice of voting all together. Notable exceptions to this include voter engagement in the United States, where women have higher voter turnout rates in presidential elections, but are still less likely to participate in other forms of conventional and unconventional political engagement.

A study based in Germany found that women with access to educational resources and who possess and live in societies that promote egalitarian values and practices are more likely to engage in politics than those who lack access to education and who live in societies with more essentialist norms and practices, in which gender roles are more prevalent and women are viewed as essentially "feminine" and fundamentally different from men.

==== Black women's voting behavior ====
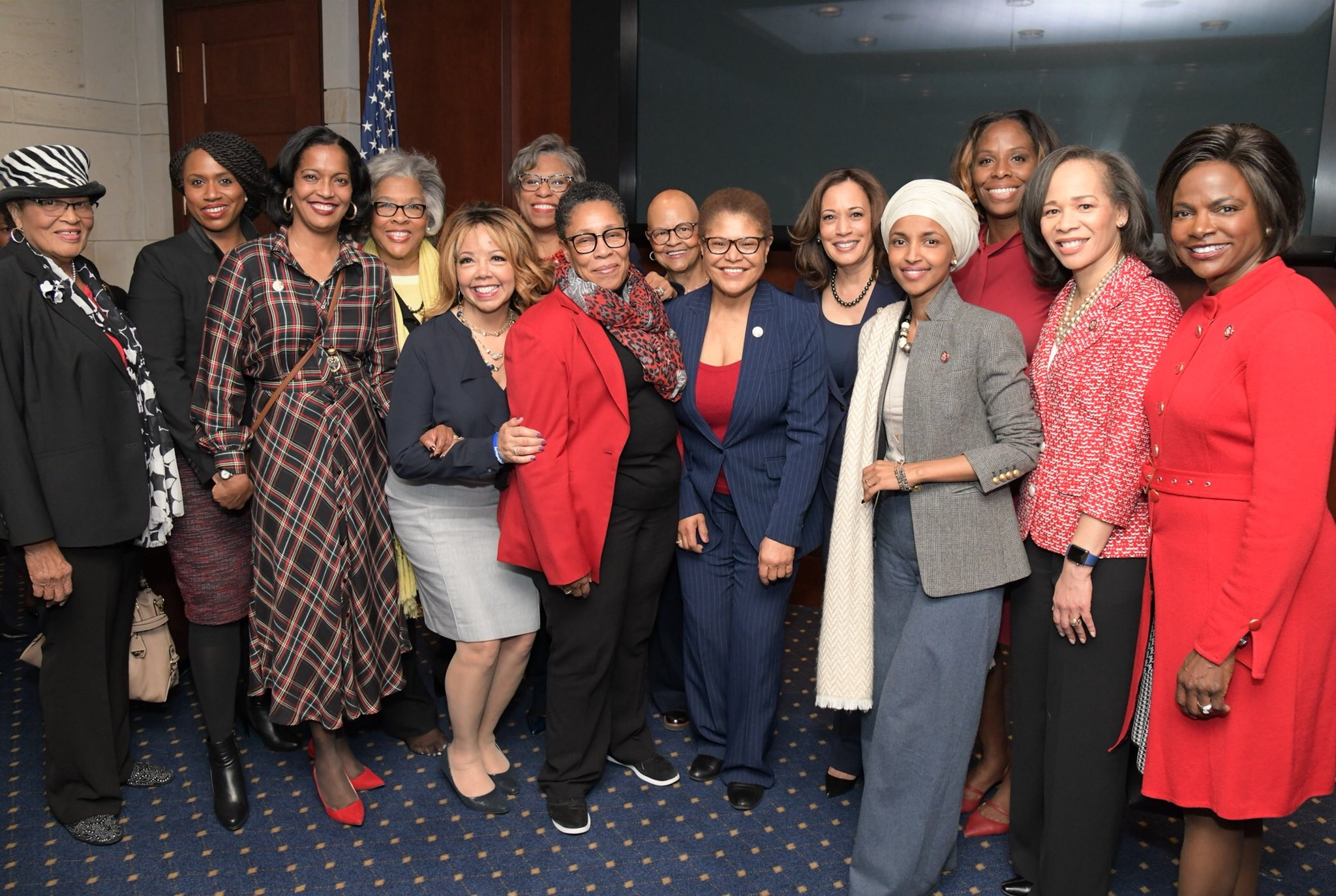
Women members of the U.S. Congressional Black Caucus 2019; Black women in the United States are much more likely than White women and than Black men to vote for Democratic candidates.

Black women in the United States are much more likely than White women and then Black men to vote for Democratic candidates, a trend that has persisted since the 1960s, and are far more likely to vote than their income would predict. From 1980 to 2016, 91% of votes cast by Black voters were for Democrats, compared to 40% among Whites. While income usually is associated with propensity to vote, this does not appear to hold true for Black women. Analyses of data from the U.S. Cooperative Congressional Election Study, a large survey that matches respondents to their voter file records, has found that low income Black women have a significantly higher predicted voting rate compared to Black men, White men, or White women in the same income category. While the researchers found that income did strongly predict voting participation among White people, it played less of a role in voter participation among Black women. Some have theorized that this increased voter participation occurs because voting and other civic engagement are ways of coping with the stress of persistent racial discrimination.

==== Women's voting preferences in India ====
Much of the above discussion pertains to women's voting preferences in the United States and Europe. Recent trends in India, the world's largest democracy, have found that women are more likely to vote along religious, rather than gender, lines, even when parties offer policies that might appear to benefit women. A survey of voters in West Bengal, India, found that voters' party choice was associated with occupation and newspaper choice and not gender, marital status, or income. Voter turnout for women in India has drastically surged since the 1990's due to Indian women feeling inadequately represented despite progress in local governments.

==== Age as a determiner ====
Age is a social factor that plays a role in every single person's life, whether it is the accessibility or simply if someone has sufficient education on political topics. As witnessed in the 2017 UK General Election, results showed that younger voters tended to opt for Labour whereas a majority of the older generations supported the Conservatives. Peer pressure must also be considered when discussing youth political and voting behaviour.

Regarding Spanish politics, the 2015 Spanish general election demonstrated that the youth are more likely to vote for new parties and abandon the main parties. Similarly, Germany has seen a change in that young supporters were the largest percentage of voters for the Alliance 90/The Greens during the 2021 German federal election. Many scholars argue that this age difference in progressive politics and voting is due to society's shift to postmaterialist values.

Socioeconomic class has also been seen as a deciding factor that influences voting behavior and exactly which policies should be implemented. Those who describe themselves as working class or middle class were given options to choose from a list of policies that could possibly be executed, the studies show that from among the 7 choices, stopping all immigration, ending all overseas aid and reducing unemployment benefits were placed as priority amongst the individuals.

== See also ==
- Altruism theory of voting
- Emotional bias
- Emotions in decision making
- Homo politicus
- Intersectionality
- Low information voter
- Political cognition
- Political literacy
- Role of networks in electoral behavior
- The personal is political
- Voting advice application
- Voting gender gap
- Votebank
- Ethnocultural politics in the United States
