= Cohort effect =

Social science term related to shared experiences

The term cohort effect is used in social science to describe shared characteristics over time among individuals who are grouped by a shared temporal experience, such as year of birth, or common life experience, such as time of exposure to radiation. Researchers evaluate this phenomenon using a cohort analysis.

For economists, the cohort effect is an important factor to consider in the context of resource dependency. This is because cohorts, which in organizations are often defined by entry or birth date, retain some common characteristic (size, cohesiveness, competition) that can affect the organization. For example, cohort effects are critical issues in school enrollment.

The cohort effect is relevant to epidemiologists searching for patterns in illnesses. Cohort effects can sometimes be mistaken for the anticipation phenomenon, which is the earlier onset of genetic illnesses in later generations. There is evidence for both a cohort effect and an anticipation effect in the increase in childhood-onset bipolar disorder.

== See also ==
- Political socialization
- Socialization
- Cohort
