= Philip Converse =

American political scientist

Philip E. Converse
- Born: November 17, 1928; Concord, New Hampshire, US
- Died: December 30, 2014 (aged 86); Ann Arbor, Michigan, US

Academic background
- Education: University of Michigan
- Thesis: Group Influence in Voting Behavior (1958)
- Doctoral advisor: Angus Campbell; Warren Miller

Academic work
- Discipline: Political science, Sociology

Philip Ernest Converse (November 17, 1928 – December 30, 2014) was an American political scientist. He was a professor in political science and sociology at the University of Michigan who conducted research on public opinion, survey research, and quantitative social science.

Converse's book chapter "The Nature of Belief Systems in Mass Publics" (Ideology and Discontent, edited by David E. Apter, 1964) held that most people lack structure and stability in their political views. With Angus Campbell, Warren Miller, and Donald E. Stokes, he co-wrote The American Voter, which used data from the American National Election Studies to create a set of surveys of American public opinion carried out by the University of Michigan Survey Research Center and the Center for Political Studies. He was elected a Fellow of the American Academy of Arts and Sciences in 1969.

== Personal life ==
Converse was born November 17, 1928, in Concord, New Hampshire. His sister, Connie, was a singer-songwriter who recorded music in the 1950s before disappearing in the 1970s. Philip earned his B.A. in English at Denison University in 1949, and he earned a master's degree in English literature from the University of Iowa in 1950. Converse was drafted into U.S. military service during the Korean War, working as a newspaper editor on a base in Battle Creek, Michigan.

In 1961, Converse married social scientist Jean G. McDonnell, an expert in interviewing techniques who directed the Detroit Area Study.

== Academic career ==
Converse studied for a time in France before returning to the United States to earn an M.A. in sociology at the University of Michigan in 1956, followed by a Ph.D. in social psychology at Michigan in 1958. As he began his graduate education, Converse worked as the assistant study director of Michigan's Survey Research Center, joining forces with Warren Miller and Angus Campbell to field the 1956–1960 National Election Study panel survey. That work produced his text for political behavior, The American Voter (1960). He served in leadership roles for the center and for the broader Institute for Social Research (ISR) in which it was housed for the rest of his career, including as director of the Center for Political Studies (1981–1986) and director of ISR itself (1986–1989).

Converse became an assistant professor of sociology at the University of Michigan in 1960. He quickly earned tenure with promotion to associate professor in 1964. One year later, he was promoted to the rank of full professor in sociology and a joint appointment in political science. After being awarded two named chair positions in the 1970s and 1980s, Converse was selected as the 1987 Henry Russel Lecturer.

Converse left the University of Michigan to become director of the Center for Advanced Study in Behavioral Sciences at Stanford University in 1989. He returned to the University of Michigan as an emeritus professor of sociology and political science in 1994.

Converse died December 30, 2014, in Ann Arbor, Michigan, at the age of 86. He was survived by his wife, Jean, and his two sons.

== Research ==
Converse is known for his work on ideology and belief systems, voters and elections, partisanship, political representation, party systems, the human meaning of social change, and political sophistication. His work drew on extensive public opinion survey data from the United States and France.

According to Professor Michael Traugott, director of the University of Michigan Center for Political Studies:

The central point of Phil's work was the inability of citizens to deal with large quantities of political information and to make it logically consistent, so they are always faced with making decisions based on inadequate information....Phil’s original research even helps to explain elements of polarization....People have the ability to screen out discordant information, but they haven’t become more sophisticated.

=== The Nature of Belief Systems in Mass Publics (1964) ===
In The Nature of Belief Systems in Mass Publics, Converse challenged the notion that ordinary citizens share the sophisticated ideological structure in political thinking seen among political elites. He argues first that belief systems are ultimately about "constraint"—if one's view changes on an issue central to the belief system, that change shifts attitudes throughout the network of other views when constraint is high. In contrast, other views do not change in a low-constraint belief system when another attitude changes. Converse says belief systems are constructed by political elites, who decide the issue views that go together, and he says political information is key for determining whether members of the mass public are capable of following these connections in their own thinking.

Next, Converse empirically analyzes belief systems in the mass public using survey data from 1956, 1958, and 1960 American National Election Studies. He proceeds in four parts. In the first section, he shows that, when asked to describe their views on the political parties and candidates, very few Americans rely on abstract principles (possibly a liberal-conservative continuum) or other signs of ideological thinking ("ideologues"). In a second category, labeled "near-ideologue", Converse groups people that peripherally mention some abstract principles used to guide their decisions, but they may not have placed much evaluative dependence on the principle or showed evidence of misunderstanding. Using the idea of a yardstick as a model, Converse explains that an ideologue would explicitly reference the yardstick when explaining their reasoning, while a "near-ideologue" may imply the existence of a yardstick, but could use it incorrectly or show obvious misunderstanding. Instead, the largest category of people think about politics and parties in terms of "group benefits" based on which prominent social groups they see as advantaged or disadvantaged by Democrats or Republicans. These social group ties tend to be stronger and more prominent when the groups are considered "visible", such as a church, union, or race, as opposed to an "invisible" social group, like social class. It is important for the masses to be cognizant of their group to see this "group benefits" category appear. Others thought about parties based on the "nature of the times" (issue- or party-driven) or "no issue content." In sum, regular people don't talk about politics in ideological ways.

In the second section, Converse shows that when Americans are asked explicitly to explain the terms "liberal" and "conservative," many struggle to link those terms to the political parties and to give meaningful reasons for those pairings. This suggests a lack of ideological understanding and again pushed against the notion of an ideological public. Converse gives an example using the following statement- "Even though it may hurt the position of the Negro in the South, state governments should be able to decide who can vote and who cannot". While this statement may seem to be focused on the rights of African Americans for most Americans, it is truly about state versus federal rights. This lack of understanding supports Converse's view of a non-ideological public. In the third section, Converse presents evidence that issue preferences in the public show low constraint, as seen in low correlations between issue pairs. This stands in contrast to relatively high constraint observed in the views of political elites. Finally, Converse shows that political attitudes are highly unstable in the mass public over time. On some issues, the public provides such inconsistent responses over two and four years that they appear to be responding almost as if at random. While this trend is evident with the general public/masses, it is not evident with the elite group. If ordinary people had idiosyncratic belief systems, he argues their views would be stable over time. The instability he observes is the final strike against the notion of an ideologically sophisticated public.

Converse concludes that mass publics generally lack the structured belief systems seen in political elites, and he speculates that this finding from mid-century America applies broadly across publics in other places and eras. Converse summarizes by stating that the mass public has a very narrow understanding of political issues and vote accordingly, thus explaining the instability of voting trends among the masses versus the elites.

In a 1970 essay, Converse calls these highly unstable political views "non-attitudes."

Converse's book Political Representation in France with Roy Pierce on mass politics in France draws similar conclusions about belief systems.

=== The American Voter (1960) ===
Converse also co-authored The American Voter with Angus Campbell, Warren Miller, and Donald Stokes. One of the book's primary contributions was the introduction of the social-psychological concept of partisan identity and investigations into its effects on political behavior. Partisanship, they say, functions more as an attachment to a social group than as a mere summary of political values and attitudes, and it is the fundamental driver in vote choice and much else. This theory became known as the Michigan Model. They also find that citizens who choose not to identify with a political party are generally disengaged from politics and low in political knowledge, in contrast to idealized views celebrating the independent voter. Evidence for the book was drawn from analysis of the 1956–1968 National Election Studies panel. The American Voter also assesses factors that influence voter turnout, the influence of electoral rules, effects from social and economic conditions, the roles of group identity and socio-economic position, and it introduces some of the initial analysis that underlies Converse's 1964 "Nature of Belief Systems" essay. The book also introduces other concepts like the "funnel of causality" modeling the long-term and short-term forces leading eventually to an individual's vote, and the "normal vote" model relating partisanship and turnout in election outcomes.

=== Controversies ===
Converse's published work includes demeaning references to women voters, as Wolbrecht and Corder note in their book, A Century of Votes for Women. In Converse's 1964 essay, he writes "The wife is very likely to follow her husband's opinions, however imperfectly she may have absorbed their justifications at a more complex level." And in his co-authored book The American Voter, they wrote "The wife who votes but otherwise pays little attention to politics tends to leave not only the sifting of information up to her husband but abides by his ultimate decision about the direction of the vote as well." The correspondence in vote choice between married couples is well-established, but it can also be explained by 1) women influencing their partners, by 2) both partners being influenced by the same external guides, by 3) people purposefully choosing politically like-minded partners, and by 4) people choosing partners based on non-political characteristics that correlate with political views.

== Awards and recognition ==
- Elected a Fellow of the American Academy of Arts and Sciences in 1969.
- Member of The American Philosophical Society and the National Academy of Sciences.
- Awarded an honorary doctorates from the University of Chicago and Denison University.
- President of the American Political Science Association (1983–1984).
- President of the International Society of Political Psychology (1980–1981).
- Fellowships awarded: Guggenheim, Fulbright, Russell Sage.

== Notable publications ==
- Campbell, A., Converse, P. E., Miller, W., & Stokes, D. (1960). The American Voter. Chicago: University of Chicago Press.
- Converse, P. E. (1962). Information flow and the stability of partisan attitudes. Public Opinion Quarterly, 26(4), 578–599.
- Converse, P. E. (1964). The nature of belief systems in mass publics. In D.E. Apter (ed.) Ideology and Its Discontent. New York: Free Press of Glencoe, 206–261. Reprinted in
- Converse, P. E. (1969). Of time and partisan stability. Comparative Political Studies, 2(2), 139–171.
- Converse, P. E. (1970). Attitudes and Non-attitudes: Continuation of a dialogue. In E. R. Tufte (ed.) The Quantitative Analysis of Social Problems. Addison-Wesley, Mass.
- Markus, G. B., & Converse, P. E. (1979). A dynamic simultaneous equation model of electoral choice. American Political Science Review, 73(4), 1055–1070.
- Converse, P. E., & Markus, G. B. (1979). Plus ça change...: The new CPS Election Study Panel. American Political Science Review, 73(1), 32–49.
- Converse, P. E., & Pierce, R. (1986). Political Representation in France. Cambridge: Belknap Press.
- Converse, P. E. (1987). Changing conceptions of public opinion in the political process. Public Opinion Quarterly, 51(2), S12-S24.
- Converse, P. E. (2000). Assessing the capacity of mass electorates. Annual Review of Political Science, 3, 331–353.
