= Merrill Shanks =

American political scientist

J. Merrill Shanks is an American political scientist and basketball player who, as of 2026, is emeritus professor of political science at the University of California Berkeley.

Shanks received an A.B. degree from Oberlin College. At Oberlin, Shanks played basketball, achieving what was at the time Oberlin's single-game scoring record and setting its single-game free-throws-made record which, as of 2014, had yet to be broken. He was later inducted into the school's athletic hall of fame. Oberlin's Patricia ’63 & Merrill ’61 Shanks Health and Wellness Center was named, in part, for Shanks in recognition of a monetary gift he made to the college.

Shanks went on to earn a Ph.D. from the University of Michigan. With Warren Miller, he is the author of The New American Voter.
