= The American Voter =

1960 book on political partisanship

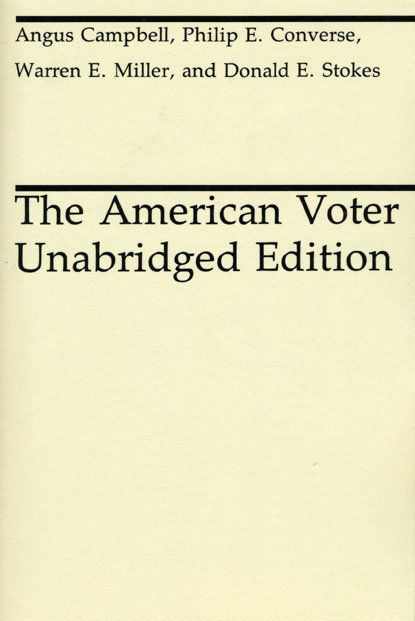
- Author: Angus Campbell, Philip Converse, Warren Miller, and Donald E. Stokes
- Language: English
- Genre: Non-fiction
- Publication date: 1960
- Publication place: United States

The American Voter, published in 1960, is a seminal study of voting behavior in the United States, authored by Angus Campbell, Philip Converse, Warren Miller, and Donald E. Stokes, colleagues at the University of Michigan. Among its controversial conclusions, based on one of the first comprehensive studies of election survey data (what eventually became the National Election Studies), is that most voters cast their ballots primarily on the basis of partisan identification (which is often simply inherited from their parents), and that independent voters are actually the least involved in and attentive to politics. This theory of voter choice became known as the Michigan Model. It was later extended to the United Kingdom by David Butler and Donald Stokes in Political change in Britain.

The American Voter established a baseline for most of the scholarly debate that has followed in the decades since. Criticism has followed along several different lines. Some argue that Campbell and his colleagues set the bar too high, expecting voters to be far more sophisticated and rational than is reasonable. Some scholars, most notably V. O. Key, Jr., in The Responsible Electorate, have argued, in part based on reinterpretation of the same data, that voters are more rational than The American Voter gives them credit for. His famous line "Voters are not fools" summarizes this view. Successors in the Michigan school have argued that in relying heavily on data from the 1956 presidential election, The American Voter drew conclusions that were not accurate over time; in particular, partisan identification has weakened in the years since 1956, a phenomenon sometimes known as dealignment (see political realignment).

The American Voter has served as a springboard from which many modern political scientists form their views on voting behavior even though the study only represents one specific time in one particular place.

Warren Miller (d. 1999) and Merrill Shanks from the University of California, Berkeley have revisited many of these questions in The New American Voter (1996), which argues against the dealignment notion, preferring the term "nonalignment" based on their conclusion that the decline in partisan identification is mostly a matter of new voters not aligning with a party rather than older voters abandoning their previous allegiances.
