= Macropartisanship =

Shifts in political party affiliation

In the United States, macropartisanship refers to the shifts in political party affiliation related to presidential popularity and political events such as wars or scandals. There is strong evidence to prove that presidential popularity and party identification move together. For example, in the 1980s, there was strong support for Republican President Ronald Reagan. Although the number of Republicans did not actually increase, the voters simply responded to the political world. Another example of this occurred in the 1960s with the election of the popular Democratic President John F. Kennedy.

Macropartisanship implies that people respond to the political world when making up their party identification. Older and more politically sophisticated people are less likely to take current events into account as their political views are more fossilized. Younger and/or weakly affiliated identifiers tend to be more affected by external events and influences.

Macropartisanship is one of several attempts by political scientists in recent years to explain the disconnect between individuals who seem to be relatively uninformed on political matters and public opinion, which seems to respond rationally to political figures and events.

The term macropartisanship was first used by American political scientists Michael MacKuen, Robert Erikson and James Stimson in 1989, to describe the overall balance between the Republican and Democratic Parties in the United States.

In the work of MacKuen and his colleagues, as well as in later work drawing on the concept, macropartisanship theory begins with the notion that short-term shifts in the party balance are systematic, rather than random (as in the "non-attitudes" explanation put forward by Converse in "The Nature of Belief Systems in Mass Publics," 1964). These shifts can be the result of presidential popularity, subjective views of the economy, or political events such as wars or scandals, and are measured through the series of party identification questions used on a variety of surveys.

While this work has been widely cited, it has been controversial. The most serious criticisms of these findings come from a measurement theory perspective, and argue that much of the variation in party identification is due to measurement error, rather than any real change.
