= V. O. Key Jr. =

American political scientist (1908–1963)

- Born: Valdimer Orlando Key Jr. March 13, 1908; Austin, Texas, US
- Died: October 4, 1963 (aged 55); Brookline, Massachusetts, US
- Education: McMurry College; University of Texas at Austin (BA, MA); University of Chicago (PhD)
- Occupation: Political scientist
- Known for: a leader of the "behavioral movement" in political studies
- Spouse: Luella Gettys (m. 1934)

Valdimer Orlando Key Jr. (March 13, 1908 – October 4, 1963) was an American political scientist known for his empirical study of American elections and voting behavior. His 1949 book Southern Politics in State and Nation examined the political systems of the 11 Southern states constituting the former Confederacy, both individually and in their shared features. He taught at Johns Hopkins University and Harvard University.

== Early life and education ==
V. O. Key was born in Austin, Texas and grew up in Lamesa.

When he was 15, his father, a lawyer and land owner, sent him to McMurry College for his last two years of high school and first year of college. He transferred to the University of Texas at Austin (BA, 1929; MA, 1930), and earned his PhD from the University of Chicago in 1934. He completed his dissertation, "The Techniques of Political Graft in the United States" (1934) under Charles E. Merriam's direction.

From 1936 to 1938, he served with the Social Science Research Council and the National Resources Planning Board.

== Career ==
He taught at UCLA, Johns Hopkins University (1938–49), and Yale University (1949–51) before starting his last professorship at Harvard University in 1951.

During World War II, he worked with his mentor Harold Foote Gosnell at the Bureau of the Budget.

In 1942, Key published the first edition of his very widely used textbook, Politics, Parties, and Pressure Groups, in which he emphasized that politics was a contest and the main players were organized interest groups. The book decisively shaped the teaching of political science by introducing realism in analysis of politics, introducing the "interest group" model, and introducing behavioral methods based on statistical analysis of election returns. It went through five editions, the last published posthumously in 1964, but was not further revised by other authors after his death.

His Southern Politics in State and Nation (1949) was a microscopic examination, state by state, of Southern politics using interviews and statistics. The book is one of the most influential books on the subject. In Public Opinion and American Democracy (1961) he analyzed the link between the changing patterns of public opinion and the governmental system. He opposed the Michigan model that argued voters' preferences were determined by psychological factors, thereby, in his view, taking most of the politics out of political science.

According to Chandler Davidson, "When Southern Politics in State and Nation was published in 1949, Key's reputation...was established beyond question. The book was magisterial, a brilliant sweeping survey of eleven southern states that destroyed once and for all the myth of the 'solid South'".

Key was elected to the American Academy of Arts and Sciences in 1955 and the American Philosophical Society in 1956.

In his posthumous work, The Responsible Electorate: Rationality in Presidential Voting 1936–60 (1966), he analyzed public opinion data and electoral returns to show what he believed to be the rationality of voters' choices as political decisions rather than responses to psychological stimuli. His opening statement to this book famously argued: "The perverse and unorthodox argument of this little book is that voters are not fools".

Key also refuted the hypothesis that "Southern backwardness" could be attributed to poor whites. Rather, he asserted that a rich oligarchy of "Southern Bourbons" manipulated working class whites, and unified Southern voters to preserve the economic and social order of the time.

Other works by Key include The Techniques of Political Graft in the United States (1936), A Primer of Statistics for Political Scientists (1954), and American State Politics: An Introduction (1956). He pioneered the study of critical elections and served as president of the American Political Science Association in 1958–59.

In October 1961, President John F. Kennedy appointed him to the President's Commission on Campaign Costs, which reported in 1962.

== Personal life ==
Key married Cora Luella Gettys Key on October 27, 1934. Born in Nebraska on October 17, 1898, she attended the University of Nebraska and earned a master's degree from its Department of Political and Social Sciences in 1921. After continuing her education at Bryn Mawr College, she received a Doctorate in Political Science from the University of Illinois, where she was a Carnegie Fellow in International Law, in 1925; her dissertation examined The Effect of Changes of Sovereignty on Nationality. She then worked at the University of Chicago in the Political Science Department, where she met her future husband, then a graduate student. After their marriage and continuing into the 1950s, Luella Key (she did not use her first name) worked at the United States Immigration and Naturalization Service. Her publications include The Reorganization of State Government in Nebraska (NE Legislative Reference Bureau, 1922), The Effect of Changes of Sovereignty on Nationality (Urbana, IL, 1926) (based on her dissertation), The Law of Citizenship in the United States (University of Chicago Press, 1934), and The Administration of Canadian Conditional Grants (Public Administration Service, 1938). Luella Key died in June 1975. Some of her papers are preserved in the Archives & Special Collections at the University of Nebraska–Lincoln Library, and in the Schlesinger Library at Harvard University.

Key died at Beth Israel Hospital in Brookline, Massachusetts.

== Publications ==
- The Techniques of Political Graft in the United States, 1934, 1936.
- The Administration of Federal Grants to States, Public Administration Service, 1937, Johnson Reprint Corp., 1972.
- (With Winston M. Crouch) The Initiative and the Referendum in California, University of California Press, 1939.
- The Problem of Local Legislation in Maryland, 1940.
- Politics, Parties, and Pressure Groups, Crowell, 1942, 2nd edition, 1947, 3rd edition, 1952, 4th edition, 1958, 5th edition, 1964;
- (With Alexander Heard) Southern Politics in State and Nation (Knopf, 1949, new edition, University of Tennessee Press, 1984).
- A Primer of Statistics for Political Scientists, Crowell, 1954, 1966.
- "A Theory of Critical Elections." 1955. Journal of Politics 17(1): 3–18.
- American State Politics: An Introduction, Knopf, 1956, Greenwood Press, 1983.
- Public Opinion and American Democracy, Knopf, 1961.
- (With Milton C. Cummings) The Responsible Electorate: Rationality in Presidential Voting, 1936–1960, Belknap Press, 1966.

== See also ==
- Political history in the United States
