= Dealignment =

Dealignment, in political science, is a trend or process whereby a large portion of the electorate abandons its previous partisan affiliation, without developing a new one to replace it. It is contrasted with political realignment.

Many scholars argue that the trends in elections in the United States over the last several decades are best characterized as dealignment, evident in the portion of Americans identifying with a political party declining sharply between 1964 and 1976 from approximately 75 percent to 63 percent. It is also believed the United Kingdom has become dealigned from social class over the past three decades.

Dealignment does not refer to an individual losing their party affiliation, but a widespread trend as many people formally abandon the party to which they had been previously tied. Essentially one ceases voting for the political candidates that are formally sponsored by that party.

Dealignment can be seen in the rise of independent candidates. In dealignment, unlike realignment, voters are not switching from one major party to another. They are abandoning all the dominant parties but not their democratic voice. Rather, they place their votes in independent candidates.

== Partisan dealignment ==
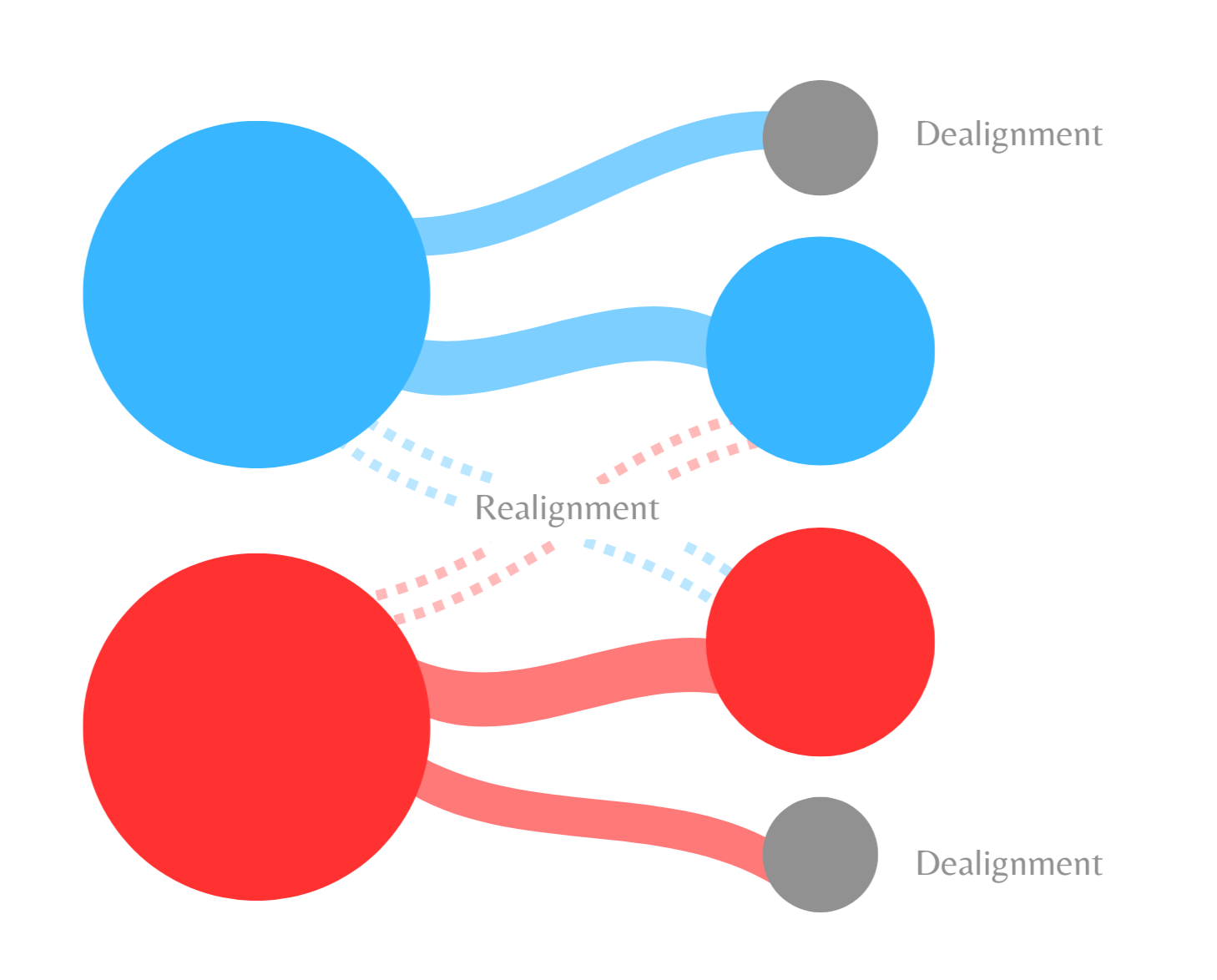
Unlike in realignment where voters switch parties, under dealignment voters become detached in part (party ID) or in whole (nonvoting) from their previous parties without aligning with a new one.

Partisan dealignment is a process in which individuals become less partisan in terms of their support for a particular political party.

The last decades, since the 1970s, have seen an increase in the process of partisan dealignment in many countries as voters become less connected to their political party. This process can result in fewer votes for the major parties, such as in the UK, or an increase in voters that vote for the opposite party due to their loss of partisanship. This dealignment shows that short term factors might play a larger role than usual in whether a candidate receives a vote from someone of their party. Several factors can be attributed to partisan dealignment, such as a greater political awareness and socialisation, intensive mass media coverage and decline of deference; disillusionment both with parties and politicians, and most importantly, the poor performance of government. Voters have also become more inclined to vote based on specific issues such as Brexit, immigration or the economy rather than voting based on a partisan attachment.

Prior to the 1970s there had been clear examples of partisan dealignment in the UK. For example, in the three elections which the Conservatives won in the 1950s, they received nearly 50% of the vote in those elections. However, in recent years loyalties towards the UK's main parties - the Labour Party and the Conservative Party - has reduced. This was seen in the 2019 general election when Labour lost votes to the Conservatives over the issue of Brexit.

== Class dealignment ==
Class dealignment is a process in which members of a social class no longer vote for the party that their class is aligned with. In the UK, traditionally, working class voters support Labour and middle class voters support the Conservatives; an example of class dealignment would be if the working class began to view themselves as lower middle class.

Class dealignment took place in Britain post-1960s, when people were more likely to pursue tertiary education, have professional jobs and consequently more affluence. As a result, working-class voters who would traditionally have voted Labour may instead vote Conservative or Liberal Democrat. This happens as people lose their traditional class loyalties to a particular party. An example of this would be the Barking and Dagenham results in the 2006 local elections, in which a traditional Labour area voted for the extreme-right British National Party.

A recent example of class dealignment was during the 2019 UK general election in which the "Red Wall", a term first used by James Kanagasooriam in relation to the traditional Labour seats in the North of England, no longer voted along class lines. The result was that traditional Labour seats, such as Great Grimsby, voted to elect a Conservative MP for the first time in decades. In addition, in 2019 the Conservative received the highest number of votes across every social class, including 41% of DE voters who traditionally voted Labour. This illustrates that people in the UK no longer vote in accordance to their class.

The 2019 general election highlights that specific issues within politics can create a forced realignment to a different party for a short time as the current issues are viewed to be more important than voting based on traditional class lines. Boris Johnson ran his campaign with the strong stance to "Get Brexit Done" while Labour were seen to be unclear on their stance towards Brexit and the EU. The majority of the "Red Wall" are anti-conservative but pro-Brexit and this creates the forced realignment as a high percentage of voter's belief in Brexit was more important than voting along their class line leading to results so shocking and so against traditional voting. This emphasises how a specific issue can cause class dealignment if the cause that a certain class believes in outweighs their feelings towards their traditional party.

An example of there being class realignment is in the US where, in the 2020 and 2024 Presidential Elections, Donald Trump, a Republican, lost support amongst wealthy fiscally conservative and socially moderate voters in the suburbs, but made huge gains with Latino voters nationwide especially in Miami-Dade County, Florida, the Rio Grande Valley in South Texas, in Los Angeles and in the Imperial Valley in California, in the Latino-heavy areas of New York City, and the Latino-heavy areas of Chicago and Cook County.

== See also ==
- Party identification
- Political apathy
- Voting
- Political realignment
