= Warren Miller (political scientist) =

American political scientist (1924–1999)

Warren E. Miller
- Born: March 26, 1924; Hawarden, Iowa
- Died: January 30, 1999 (aged 74); Scottsdale, Arizona

Academic background
- Education: Syracuse University
- Thesis: Issue Orientation and Political Behavior (1952)

Academic work
- Doctoral students: Philip Converse

Warren Edward Miller (March 26, 1924 – January 30, 1999) was an American political scientist in the field of American political behavior. Best known as a co-author of the seminal book, The American Voter, alongside Angus Campbell, Philip Converse and Donald Stokes, which provided the basis for the social-psychological "Michigan school" of thought in American political behavior, Miller had a full and impressive career as a political scientist.

Miller is further credited as founder of Inter-university Consortium for Political and Social Research (ICPSR) at the University of Michigan in Ann Arbor as well as a central figure in the bi-yearly National Election Studies (NES).

Miller was a professor of political science at the University of Michigan from 1951 until 1981 when he left for Arizona State University where he worked until his death. His last published volume, The New American Voter, which he co-authored with J. Merrill Shanks, was printed in 1996.
