= Angus Campbell (psychologist) =

American psychologist (1910–1980)

A. Angus Campbell
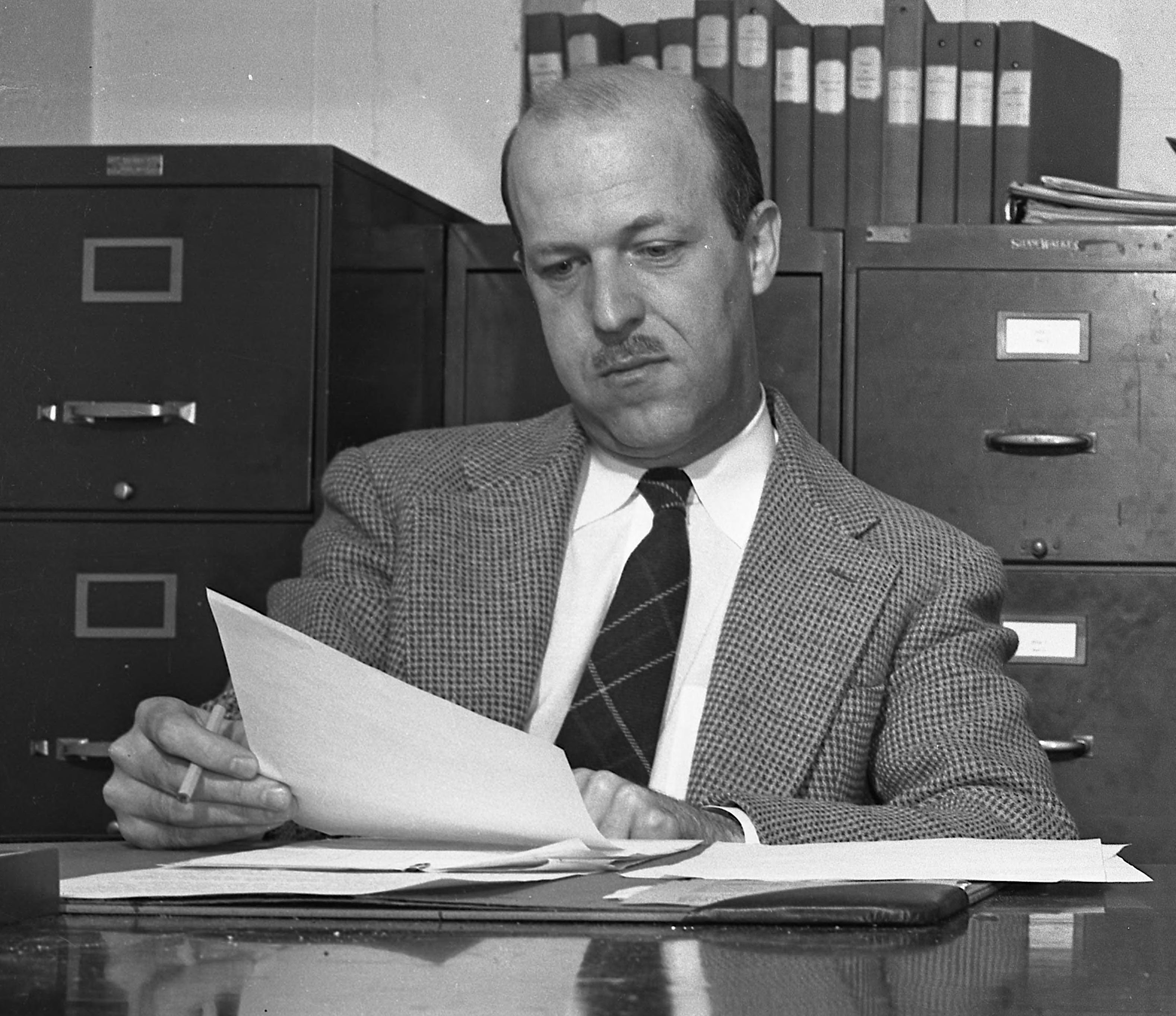
- Campbell at the University of Michigan going over the plans of a survey in 1948
- Born: August 10, 1910; Leiters Ford, Indiana
- Died: December 15, 1980 (aged 70); Ann Arbor, Michigan

Academic background
- Education: Stanford University
- Thesis: An Experimental Analysis of Ease of Conditioning in Man (1936)
- Doctoral advisor: Ernest Hilgard

Academic work
- Discipline: Psychology
- Institutions: University of Michigan
- Doctoral students: Philip Converse

Albert Angus Campbell (August 10, 1910 – December 15, 1980) was an American social psychologist best known for his research into electoral systems and for co-writing The American Voter with Philip Converse, Warren Miller, and Donald E. Stokes. Campbell published his work under the name Angus Campbell. He was a professor at the University of Michigan. He died in Ann Arbor, Michigan on December 15, 1980.

== Bibliography ==
- Campbell, Angus, Converse, Philip E., Miller, Warren E., Stokes, Donald E. (1960). The American Voter.
- Campbell, Angus (1964). The American Voter, an Abridgment. New York: John Wiley and Sons.
- Campbell, Angus (1966). Elections and the Political Order. New York: John Wiley and Sons.
- Campbell, Angus, Gurin, Gerald, Miller, Warren E. (1971). The Voter Decides. New York: Praeger.
- Campbell, Angus. (1971). White Attitudes Towards Black People. Institute for Social Research.
- Campbell, Angus, and Converse, Philip E. (1972). The Human Meaning of Social Change. New York: Russell Sage Foundation.
