= Dave Wasserman =

Political journalist and analyst (born 1984)

- Born: David Nathan Wasserman; September 13, 1984 (age 42); New Brunswick, New Jersey, U.S.
- Education: University of Virginia (BA)
- Spouse: Katherine Kline (m. 2015; div. 2026)
- Children: 2

David Nathan Wasserman (born September 13, 1984) is an American political analyst known for his coverage of elections to the United States House of Representatives. He has worked as an editor at the nonpartisan election analysis newsletter The Cook Political Report with Amy Walter since 2007 and is a contributor to NBC News. Wasserman is considered an expert on redistricting in the United States.

== Early life and education ==
Wasserman grew up in Montgomery Township, New Jersey where he attended Montgomery High School as part of the class of 2002.

He attended the University of Virginia, where he studied government. As a student, he worked for Sabato's Crystal Ball, serving as its House Editor for three years. In that role, he correctly predicted that the Democratic Party would gain 29 seats in the 2006 United States House of Representatives elections. Wasserman graduated from the university with distinction in 2006 and was awarded the Emmerich-Wright Prize for his thesis on congressional redistricting standards.

== Career ==
Wasserman joined The Cook Political Report in June 2007 and is currently its senior editor for the U.S. House of Representatives. His work has been featured in a multitude of outlets, including The New York Times, The Wall Street Journal, The Washington Post, The Economist, Politico, and RealClearPolitics. Since 2008, he has served as an election night analyst for NBC News and has also provided commentary for CNN, Fox News, C-SPAN, and NPR. Wasserman was a contributing writer to the 2014 and 2016 editions of The Almanac of American Politics.

Less than two months before the 2016 presidential election, Wasserman successfully predicted the possibility that Donald Trump could win the White House without winning the popular vote. He predicted a "Category 2 or 3" red or Republican "hurricane" ahead of the 2022 midterm elections.

In addition to predicting elections, Wasserman is known for his real-time analysis of election returns and early election calls on Twitter. He is known for prefacing his election calls with the catchphrase, "I've seen enough."

== Awards and honors ==
In 2018, Wasserman's interactive collaboration with FiveThirtyEight, the "Atlas of Redistricting", won the top prize for News Data App of the Year at the Data Journalism Awards organized by the Global Editors Network. He was named a Pritzker Fellow at the University of Chicago's Institute of Politics during the spring of 2019.

== Personal life ==
Wasserman married Katherine Kline in 2015.
