= Party identification =

Affiliation with a political party

Party identification refers to the political party with which an individual is affiliated with. Party identification is typically determined by the political party that an individual most commonly supports (by voting or other means).

Some researchers view party identification as "a form of social identity", in the same way that a person identifies with a religious or ethnic group. This identity develops early in a person's life mainly through family and social influences. This description would make party identification a stable perspective, which develops as a consequence of personal, family, social, and environmental factors. Other researchers consider party identification to be more flexible and more of a conscious choice. They see it as a position and a choice based on the continued assessment of the political, economic, and social environment. Party identification can increase or even shift by motivating events or conditions in the country.

Party identification has been most studied in the United States where it is considered among the most stable and early-formed identities an individual may have. In other countries, party identification has often been considered a subset of other levels of identity such as class, religion, or language; or to vary rapidly over time.

A number of studies have found that a partisan lens affects how a person perceives the world. Partisan voters judge character flaws more harshly in rival candidates than their own, believe the economy is doing better when their own party is in power, and underplay scandals and failures of their own side. A recent study shows that the impact of partisanship is likely to be the largest relative to other social identities over class, religion, gender, age, and even nationality, by analyzing 25 democracies in Europe, whose party identification has been viewed to be more flexible and weaker compared to that of the United States.

Party Identification can also be looked at in British politics. In the UK, the two main political parties are the Labour Party and the Conservative Party but there are also other smaller challenger parties. Research shows that fewer British people identify with a political party now than thirty years ago. In 2012, a study showed that 72% of Britons surveyed did identify with a political party. Younger people are generally less likely to identify with a political party in comparison to both older voters and voters thirty years ago.

== Stability ==
In the 1950s the Michigan Model described in The American Voter rose to prominence. It argues that partisan identity forms early in life and rarely changes, with the rare exception of realignment elections. Voting behaviour and political opinions grow out of this partisanship. The theory worked well to explain why party structures remained stable in most democracies for the first part of the 20th century. Political socialisation remains the bedrock of many theories about partisanship and party choice. Those we grow up with and spend time around, most notably our families, define much of how we see the political world and guide our first political choices. The Michigan model, based in large part on parental socialization, was developed to explain American voting behaviour. Partisanship and political identities, like religion or class, are passed on from parent to child. Recent research demonstrates that these parent socialisation processes are often stronger in the case of mothers. and is significantly weaker in the case of LGBTQ+ children.

In the 1980s, a revisionist school developed along with the breakdown of the two-party system and growing dealignment in several major industrialized democracies. It argues that partisan identity formed slowly in a Bayesian process as voters accumulate data and opinions over a lifetime. By late in life, a single new piece of information will have little effect, but there is always the opportunity for partisan identity to change and will fluctuate based on short-term events for many voters.

Today the view of partisan identity being the main determinant of a person's political beliefs and actions remains predominant among American political scientists, those from other countries put less emphasis on it.

== Measuring party identification ==
Political scientists have developed many ways to measure party identification in order to examine and evaluate it.

One American method of measuring party identification uses the Likert Scale, a 7-point scale to measure party identification, with Strong Democrat on one extreme and Strong Republican at the other. In between the two extremes are the classifications of "Lean Democrat/Republican" and "Weak Democrat/Republican".

Strong Democrat	Weak Democrat	Lean Democrat	Independent	Lean Republican	Weak Republican	Strong Republican

== Voting ==
Those people who identify with a party tend to vote for their party's candidate for various offices in high percentages. Those who consider themselves to be strong partisans, strong Democrats and strong Republicans respectively, tend to be the most faithful in voting for their party's nominee for office. In the case of voting for president, since the 1970s, party identification on voting behavior has been increasing significantly. By the late 1990s, party identification on voting behavior was at the highest level of any election since the 1950s. When voting in congressional elections, the trend is similar. Strong party identifiers voted overwhelmingly for their party's nominee in the general election. Each party respectively in certain elections, would have stronger voting behavior of their strongest party identifiers. For instance, in the years the Democrats dominated House and Senate elections in the 1970s and 1980s, it can be explained that their strong party identifiers were more loyal in voting for their party's nominee for Congress than the Republicans were.

The same level of voting behavior can also be applied to state and local levels. While straight ticket voting has declined among the general voting population, it is still prevalent in those who are strong Republicans and strong Democrats. According to Paul Allen Beck and colleagues, "the stronger an individual's party identification was, the more likely he or she was to vote a straight ticket."

== Party membership ==
Party identification and party membership are conceptually distinct. Party identification, as described above, is a social identity. Party membership is a formal form of affiliation with a party, often involving registration with a party organization.

Party membership can serve as an 'anchor' on a voter's party identification, such that they remain with the party even when their views differ from declared party platforms. These party members tend to remain loyal in downballot or lower salience elections. This is often the case when party coalitions are in flux, such as the Republican realignment in the Southern United States in the second half of the twentieth century.

== See also ==
- The Voter Decides
