= Michigan model =

Voter choice theory

The Michigan model is a theory of voter choice, based primarily on sociological and party identification factors. Originally proposed by political scientists, beginning with an investigation of the 1952 Presidential election, at the University of Michigan's Survey Research Centre. These scholars developed and refined an approach to voting behaviour in terms of a voter's psychological attachment to a political party, acknowledging cleavages on a group level, which would be continued over the next two decades.

The initial research saw three major factors to voting behaviour: Personal identification with one of the political parties, concern with issues of national government policy, and personal attraction to the presidential candidates. Later, their analysis saw that party identification and attachment were the most common factors. Furthermore, according to the model, this party attachment is generally stable, formulated by outside social influences, including parents, family members and others in one's sociological spectrum. Two sets of data were used in the model's construction: the 1964 and 1968 national, cross-sectional surveys of the presidential election. They were designed as representative samples of those, with private households, voting in the US.

However, in recent years, the model has been challenged by spatial and valence models, forcing proponents to reconsider the long term implications of party attachment. In some ways the Michigan model and spatial model are opposite ends of the spectrum, with the Michigan model arguing voting is purely partisan and the spatial model arguing voting is based on ideological proximity to the candidates. In spatial voting theories there is no role for partisanship in voting. Furthermore, critics claim that the Michigan model exaggerates the assumption that party identification is cemented by circumstances, but rather that party identification can change in light of a party's performance or other circumstances. The model is only applicable to American winner-take-all systems, as lack of choice contributes to small chances for partisan ID to change. The model most famously appeared in The American Voter.

== The funnel of causality ==
The model relies heavily on early attachment to parties, through the funnel of causality. This shows long term effects such as: sociological characteristics (race, ethnicity, gender and sexual orientation), social status characteristics (social class and occupation), and parental characteristics (values and partisanship). These factors go on to create party identification which is largely static within individual voters. Through an individual's partisan identification, short term choices such as candidate evaluation and issue perceptions are created.
