= George E. Marcus (political scientist) =

American political scientist

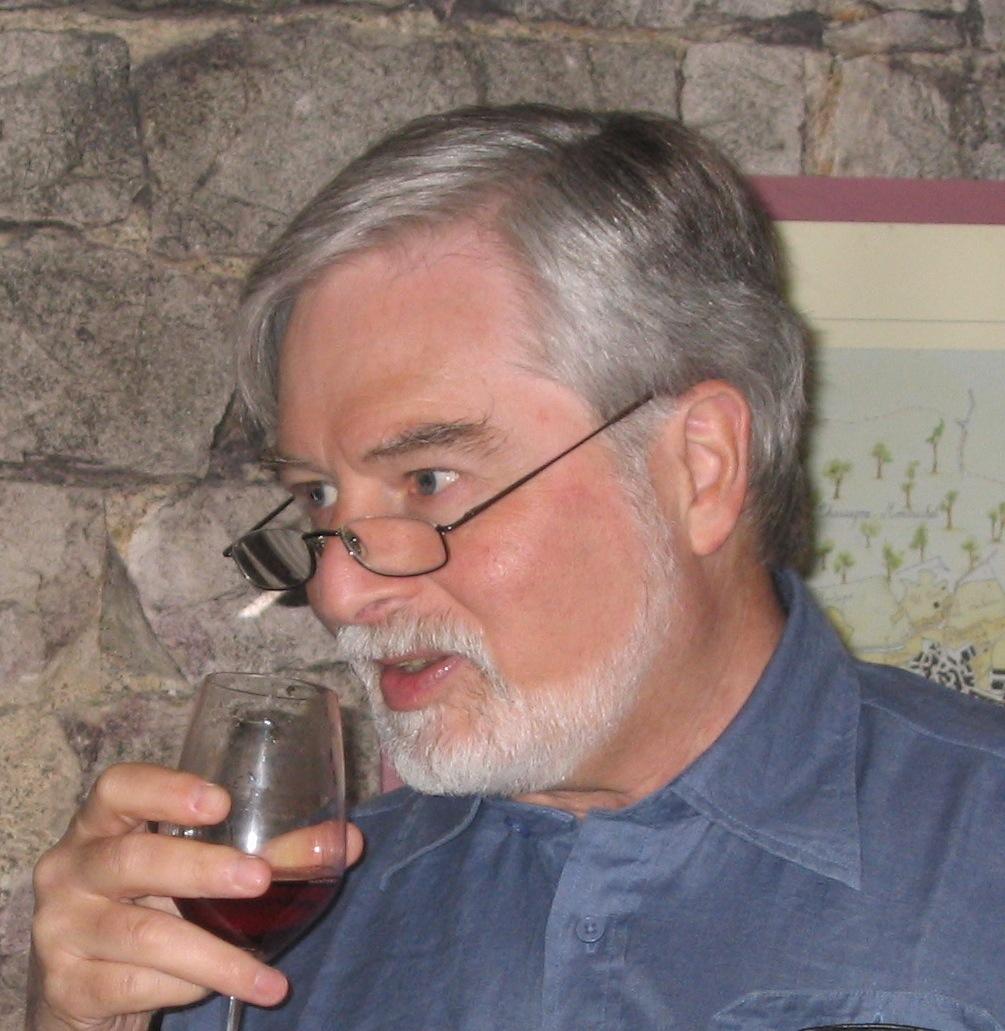
- Marcus' Portrait
- Born: February 13, 1943 (age 83); Boston, Massachusetts, U.S.
- Known for: Affective intelligence theory
- Awards: Harold D. Lasswell Award (2019); Philip E. Converse Book Award (2006); Best Book in Political Psychology (1995); Jeanne M. Knutson Award (1997)
- Scientific career
- Fields: Political science, Political psychology
- Workplaces: Williams College

George E. Marcus (born February 13, 1943) is an American political scientist and Professor Emeritus of Political Science at Williams College. He is best known for developing affective intelligence theory, which integrates neuroscience and psychology to explain how emotions shape political judgment and behavior.

First presented in the 2000 book Affective Intelligence and Political Judgment (co-authored with W. Russell Neuman and Michael B. MacKuen), the theory has influenced scholarship on voter decision-making, political tolerance, responses to terrorism, support for authoritarian policies, and populist movements by challenging purely rational-choice models of political behavior.

== Academic career ==
Marcus received a B.A. in Government from Columbia University in 1964, an M.A. in Political Science from Northwestern University in 1965, and a Ph.D. in Political Science from Northwestern in 1968. He held a postdoctoral fellowship in the Psychology and Politics Program at Yale University (1970-1971).

He joined the Williams College faculty in 1967 as a lecturer, rising to assistant professor (1968), associate professor (1974), and professor (1980). He held the Sue and Edgar Wachenheim III Professorship (1993-1995) and became Professor Emeritus in 2018. He has served as visiting professor at the University of Minnesota (1984-1985) and at Sciences Po in Paris (2005-2006 and spring 2013).

Marcus co-founded and co-edited the journal Political Methodology (1974-1985). He was executive director of the International Society of Political Psychology (ISPP) from 1991 to 1996, later serving as vice-president (2000-2003), president (2006-2007), and councillor (2010-2015). He was a member of the Board of Directors of the Roper Center for Public Opinion Research from 1989 to 2008 and served as chairman from 2006 to 2008.

He has served on numerous editorial boards, including Political Psychology, Political Analysis, the Journal of Politics, and the Journal of Philosophy of Emotion.

== Research and contributions ==
Marcus’s early research focused on political tolerance, ideology, and public opinion. With John L. Sullivan and James Piereson, he co-authored Political Tolerance and American Democracy (1982), which received the Philip E. Converse Award in 2006 for its lasting contribution to the study of elections, public opinion, and voting behavior.

In the 1980s he began incorporating neuroscience into the study of emotion and politics. With W. Russell Neuman and Michael B. MacKuen, he developed affective intelligence theory in the book Affective Intelligence and Political Judgment (2000). The theory identifies three preconscious emotional systems:

- Enthusiasm - appraises the success or failure of habitual behaviors.
- Fear/Anxiety - appraises whether something unexpected or unfamiliar, signals novelty or threat and motivates attention and learning.
- Anger - appraises whether violations of social norms are present.

The theory has been influential in political psychology but has also prompted scholarly proposals for extensions to address gaps in its conceptualization of emotional phenomena. This framework has been applied to voter behavior during political campaigns, tolerance judgments, responses to terrorism, support for authoritarian policies, and the rise of populist movements. His subsequent books include:

- With Malice Toward Some: How People Make Civil Liberties Judgments (1995, with Sullivan, Elizabeth Theiss-Morse, and Sandra Wood) - awarded best book in political psychology by the APSA Political Psychology Section.
- The Sentimental Citizen: Emotion in Democratic Politics (2002; French edition 2008).
- The Affect Effect: Dynamics of Emotion in Political Thinking and Behavior (2007, ed. with others).
- Political Psychology: Neuroscience, Genetics, and Politics (2012).
- Going to War in Iraq: When the Press and Citizens Matter (2015, with Stanley Feldman and Leonie Huddy).

Marcus has collaborated extensively with three teams. From early 70s to early 2000s John L. Sullivan. From late 1980s to late 2010s Michael B. MacKuen, and W. Russell Neuman, and from 2013 to early 2020s, Pavlos Vasilopoulos, Martial Foucault, and Nicholas Valentino.

== Awards and recognition ==
- Harold D. Lasswell Award (2019) - International Society of Political Psychology, for distinguished scientific contributions to political psychology.
- Philip E. Converse Book Award (2006) - American Political Science Association, for Political Tolerance and American Democracy.
- Best Book in Political Psychology (1995) - APSA Political Psychology Section, for With Malice Toward Some.
- Jeanne M. Knutson Award (1997) - International Society of Political Psychology, for long-standing service to the International Society of Political Psychology.

He has received research grants from the National Science Foundation, National Endowment for the Humanities, Exxon Education Foundation, Knight Foundation, and others. In 2023 he delivered the Jerrold Post Lecture on Neuropolitics at the University of California, Irvine Center for Neuropolitics.

== Selected publications ==
=== Selected Books ===
- Marcus, George E. (2002). The Sentimental Citizen: Emotion in Democratic Politics. Penn State University Press (French edition: Le Citoyen Sentimental, 2008).
- Sullivan, John L., Piereson, James Piereson, & Marcus, George E. (1982). Political Tolerance and American Democracy. University of Chicago Press.
- Marcus, George E., Sullivan, John L., Theiss-Morse, Elizabeth, & Wood, Sandra L. (1995). With Malice Toward Some: How People Make Civil Liberties Judgments. Cambridge University Press.
- Marcus, George E., Neuman, W. Russell, & MacKuen, Michael B. (2000). Affective Intelligence and Political Judgment. University of Chicago Press.

=== Selected articles and chapters ===
- Marcus, G. E., & MacKuen, M. B. (1993). Anxiety, Enthusiasm and the Vote: The Emotional Underpinnings of Learning and Involvement during Presidential Campaigns. American Political Science Review, 87(3), 688-701.
- MacKuen, M. B., Wolak, J., Keele, L., & Marcus, G. E. (2010). Civic Engagements: Resolute Partisanship or Reflective Deliberation. American Journal of Political Science, 54(2), 440-458.
- Marcus, G. E., Neuman, W. R., & MacKuen, M. B. (2017). Measuring Emotional Response: Comparing Alternative Approaches to Measurement. Political Science Research and Methods, 5(4), 733-754.
- Vasilopoulos, P., Marcus, G. E., Valentino, N., & Foucault, M. (2019). Fear, anger and voting for the far right. Political Psychology, 40(4), 679-696.
- Marcus, G. E., Valentino, N., Vasilopoulos, P., & Foucault, M. (2019). Applying the theory of affective intelligence to support for authoritarian policies and parties. Advances in Political Psychology, 40(S1), 109-139.
- Marcus, G. E. (2023). Evaluating the status of theories of emotion in political science and psychology. Frontiers in Political Science, 4, 1080884.
