= Wendy Rahn =

American political scientist

- Education: Creighton University; University of Minnesota
- Awards: Erik Erikson Award ISPP; Emerging Scholar Award, APSA; Russell Sage Foundation Grant
- Scientific career
- Fields: Political science
- Workplaces: Ohio State University; The University of Wisconsin; Duke University; University of Minnesota

Wendy Rahn is an American political scientist. She is a professor of political science at the University of Minnesota, researching social capital, partisanship and civic engagement in American democracy, and the role of emotions in political behavior.

== Early work and education ==
Rahn attended Creighton University, graduating with a BA in political science in 1984. She then attended the University of Minnesota, receiving a PhD in political science in 1990.

In 1989 Rahn joined the faculty at Ohio State University, in 1991 moved to The University of Wisconsin, and then in 1994 moved to Duke University. In 1995, she became a professor at the University of Minnesota.

== Career ==
Rahn's 1997 article with John Brehm in the American Journal of Political Science, "Individual-level evidence for the causes and consequences of social capital", has been credited with being a fundamental advance in the discussion of social capital and has received thousands of citations. In a discussion of the academic literature on social capital in the book Competition and Cooperation: Conversations with Nobelists about Economics and Political Science, Rahn and Brehm were credited with having "had a significant impact on political science".

Rahn has received several major awards. She was the recipient of the 1999 Erik Erikson Early Career Award from the International Society of Political Psychology, which "recognizes and celebrates exceptional achievement" to a scholar who received a PhD within the previous decade. She was also the 1999 recipient of the Emerging Scholar Award from the American Political Science Association. In 2007, Rahn received an award from the Russell Sage Foundation to investigate "how broadened stock ownership may contribute to disparities in political participation and the polarization of America's policy preferences".

A 2019 citation analysis by the political scientists Hannah June Kim and Bernard Grofman listed Rahn as one of the most cited political scientists working at an American university in 3 different categories: the top 40 most cited women scholars, the top 25 most cited political scientists who study Public Policy, Public Administration, Public Law, or Political Psychology, and also the top 25 most cited political scientists who earned their PhD between 1990 and 1994 (inclusive).

Rahn has been on the board responsible for overseeing the National Election Studies, and has been an editor for the journal Political Psychology. Her work has been published or cited in news outlets like The Washington Post, The New York Times, Politico, and The Christian Science Monitor.

== Selected works ==
- "The role of partisan stereotypes in information processing about political candidates", American Journal of Political Science (1993)
- "Individual-level evidence for the causes and consequences of social capital", American Journal of Political Science, with John Brehm (1997)
- "The origins and consequences of public trust in government: A time series analysis", Public Opinion Quarterly, with Virginia A. Chanley and Thomas J. Rudolph (2000)

== Selected awards ==
- Erik Erikson Early Career Award (1999)
- Emerging Scholar Award, American Political Science Association (1999)
- Russell Sage Foundation Grant (2007)
