= Dave Redlawsk =

American academic in political science (born 1958)

- Born: 1958 (age 67–68)
- Education: Duke University (BA in Political Science, 1976–1980); Vanderbilt University (MBA, 1980–1982); Rutgers University (MA and PhD in Political Science, 1990–1997)
- Known for: Decision Making; Political Psychology; Voting Behavior; Political Campaigning; Local Government; Survey (human research)
- Scientific career
- Workplaces: University of Delaware; Rutgers University; University of Iowa; Fisk University

David P. Redlawsk (born 1958) is an American political scientist and politician. He specializes in political psychology and the health of democratic institutions. His research focuses on how information and emotions shape voter decision-making.

On November 3, 2026, Redlawsk was elected to the Delaware General Assembly from the 23rd Representative District, on the north side of Newark, Delaware. On September 15, 2026, he won a 4-way Democratic Primary for the open seat. He faced no opposition in the general election.

He has written or edited more than 10 books, more than 60 journal articles and book chapters, and more than 40 other articles on various political subjects. His research has been published in a number of peer-reviewed journals including the American Political Science Review, the American Journal of Political Science, the Journal of Politics, Political Behavior, Politics and the Life Sciences, Presidential Studies Quarterly, and Political Psychology.

Redlawsk was one of the earliest scholars identifying and applying motivated reasoning to politics, with his research on both cognitive heuristics and emotions in politics regularly cited. He is an expert on the Iowa Caucuses’ role in the U.S. presidential nominating process.

== Academic career ==
From 2016 to 2026, Redlawsk was the James R. Soles Professor of Political Science and Chair of the Department of Political Science and International Relations at the University of Delaware in Newark, Delaware.

From 2018 to 2019, Redlawsk served as President of the International Society of Political Psychology. Previously, he served as vice president (2015-2017) and Governing Council member (2007-2010). He was elected ISPP Treasurer in 2023.

From 2010 to 2015, he co-edited the journal Political Psychology.

Redlawsk served on the Board of Overseers for the American National Election Studies from 2009 to 2013. The studies are academically run national surveys of voters in the United States, conducted before and after every presidential election.

From 2009 to 2016, he was Director of the Eagleton Center for Public Interest Polling and Professor of Political Science at Rutgers University in New Brunswick, New Jersey, where he directed the Rutgers-Eagleton Poll.

He served as an assistant and associate professor of political science at the University of Iowa from 1999 to 2009, where he founded and directed the Hawkeye Poll, a series of national and state public opinion polls that resulted in important research by faculty and graduate students.

Redlawsk’s research has been funded by the National Science Foundation, the MacArthur Foundation, the European Commission, and Fairvote.

His work has been discussed on PBS Washington Week, NPR Here and Now (Boston), The Washington Post, BBC, Public Radio International and WNYC The Takeaway, The Boston Globe, WHYY, Canadian Broadcasting Corporation CBC Television, Euronews, and C-span.,

== Books ==
- Heumann, Milton, Thomas W. Church & David P. Redlawsk. Hate Speech on Campus: Cases, Case Studies, and Commentary. 1997. Northeastern University Press, Boston.
- Lau, Richard R. & David P. Redlawsk. How Voters Decide: Information Processing in an Election Campaign, 2006. Cambridge University Press. The book won the 2007 Alexander George Award for best Book in Political Psychology from the International Society of Political Psychology.
- Mates, Kyle & David P. Redlawsk. 2014. The Positive Case for Negative Campaigning, Chicago. University of Chicago Press, Chicago, Illinois.
- Redlawsk, David P. (Editor). The Oxford Encyclopedia of Political Decision Making, Vol. 1, A-I. 2021. Oxford University Press, New York, NY.
- Redlawsk, David P. (Editor).The Oxford Encyclopedia of Political Decision Making, Vol. 2, J-V. 2021. Oxford University Press, New York, NY.
- Redlawsk, David P. & Tom W. Rice, Civic Service: Servicer-learning with State and Local Government Partners. 2009. Jossey-Bass, San Francisco, California.
- Redlawsk, David P. How Voters Use Campaign Information: On-line Versus Memory-based Processing in a Presidential Election. Thesis. 1997.
- Redlawsk, David P. The American Governor: Power, Constraint, and Leadership in the States. 2015. Palgrave Macmillan, New York, NY.
- Redlawsk, David P., & Michael Habegger. 2020. A Citizen's Guide to the Political Psychology of Voting. Routledge, New York, NY.
- Redlawsk, David P., Caroline J. Tolbert & Todd Donovan. 2011. Why Iowa?: How Caucuses and Sequential Elections Improve the Presidential Nominating Process. University of Chicago Press.

== Political career ==
In 2026, Redlawsk stepped down as the Department of Political Science Department Chair at the University of Delaware and filed to run for the Delaware House of Representatives as a Democrat for the 23rd District, replacing Democrat Mara Gorman, who chose to run for the Delaware State Senate. His campaign emphasized policies impacting the cost of living and regulation of data centers. He won the September Democratic primary with 58% of the vote. No Republican filed to run, and he was elected unopposed in November 2026.

In 2006, he served as treasurer and senior advisor for Dave Loebsack’s first successful run for the U.S. House of Representatives in Iowa’s 2nd Congressional District. Loebsack pulled off a major political upset by defeating a 15-term Republican incumbent and winning his first term as the U.S. Representative for Iowa's 2nd Congressional District. He went on to be reelected six more times

During his time at the University of Iowa, Redlawsk served as acting chair of the Johnson County Democratic Party during the 2004 Iowa Caucuses and managed 57 precincts in what was then the county’s largest-ever caucus turnout.

In 1995, he became the first Democrat elected to the Hillsborough Township Committee in New Jersey in 13 years. He was re-elected in 1998 and helped transform the committee from entirely Republican to entirely Democratic, which happened in the 1999 election, when he left to become an assistant professor at the University of Iowa.

Redlawsk served as chair of a local planning commission and as an elected local official in both Pennsylvania and New Jersey in the 1980s and 1990s.

== Early life and education ==
Redlawsk was born in Syracuse, New York, and graduated from Mechanicsburg Area Senior High School in Mechanicsburg, Pennsylvania, in 1976.

Redlawsk earned a doctorate from Rutgers University in 1997 and also holds an M.A. from Rutgers University, an M.B.A. from Vanderbilt University, and a B.A. from Duke University.

He began his professional career as the Director of the Computer Center (IT Director) and lecturer in Management at Fisk University, the historically Black university (HBCU) in Nashville, from 1983 to 1986, where he was also a Woodrow Wilson Foundation (now Institute for Citizens and Scholars) Administrative Fellow.

He was Director of Computing at Moravian University (then College) from 1986 to 1990, when he left to begin his Ph.D. studies at Rutgers University.

He worked as Manager, Assessment Division Technology Support Group, Educational Testing Service from 1997-1999.

== Personal life ==
Redlawsk is married to Aletia Morgan, who has served on school boards both in Hillsborough, New Jersey, and in Iowa City. They have two children, Andrew Redlawsk and Greg Redlawsk.
