= Nicholas Valentino =

American political scientist

Academic background
- Education: Brown University (A.B.); UCLA (Ph.D.)

Academic work
- Institutions: University of Michigan; University of Texas at Austin (2007-2009)

Nicholas A. Valentino is an American political scientist. He currently serves as a principal investigator of the American National Election Studies (ANES).

Valentino earned a bachelor's degree from Brown University and completed his doctorate at the University of California, Los Angeles. He began teaching at the University of Michigan in 1997. He left Michigan for an appointment as Mike Hogg Professor of Community Affairs at the University of Texas at Austin in 2007. He returned to the University of Michigan faculty in 2009.

Valentino is the Donald R. Kinder Collegiate Professor of Political Science and Research Professor at the Center for Political Studies at the University of Michigan Institute for Social Research. He served as president of the International Society of Political Psychology from 2019–2020. Valentino specializes in political psychological approaches to understanding public opinion formation, socialization, information seeking and electoral participation. His work employs experimental methods, surveys, and content analyses of political communication. The research has focused on the intersecting roles of racial attitudes and emotional dynamics, and has been published in the American Political Science Review, the American Journal of Political Science, The Journal of Politics, Political Psychology, and Public Opinion Quarterly. Valentino is currently exploring the changing nature of racial rhetoric in America and around the world, and the ways empathy for outgroups can blunt dangerous overreactions to threats from globalization and multiculturalism.

With Alex Mintz and Carly Wayne, Valentino is a co-author of Beyond Rationality: Behavioral Political Science in the 21st Century (Cambridge University Press 2021). He is the co-author of Seeing Us in Them: Social Divisions and the Politics of Group Empathy with Cigdem V. Sirin, and José D. Villalobos (Cambridge University Press 2021). Seeing Us in Them examines outgroup empathy as a powerful predisposition in politics that pushes individuals to see past social divisions and work together in complex, multicultural societies. It also reveals racial/ethnic intergroup differences in this predisposition, rooted in early patterns of socialization and collective memory. The book won the APSA Best Book Award (2022), the David Sears Best Book in Political Psychology (2022), the Robert Lane Award (2022), and the Best Book in Experimental Political Science Award (APSA, 2022).

Nicholas Valentino was elected to the American Academy of Arts and Sciences in 2026. His major awards also include: The Rackham Distinguished Graduate Mentoring Award (University of Michigan, 2024), the Tronstein Award for Undergraduate Teaching in Political Science (University of Michigan, 2017), and the Erik H. Erikson Award for Early Career Research Achievement (International Society of Political Psychology, 2005).

David O. Sears and Shanto Iyengar were Valentino's dissertation co-chairs at UCLA.

Valentino has served as chair or co-chair on the dissertation committees of: Hilary Izatt, Sara Morell, Anil Menon, Kirill Zhirkov, Marzia Oceno, James Newburg, Erin Cikanek, Princess Williams, Julia Kamin, Fabian Neuner, Timothy Ryan, Ismail White, Eric Groenendyk, Antoine Banks, Yanna Krupnikov, Patrick O'Mahen; Katie Brown, Debra Melican, Krysha Gregorowicz, Rossie Hutchinson, Christine Brittle, Thomas Buhr, and Matthew Vandenbroek.
