= Racial resentment scale =

Measure of symbolic racism

The racial resentment scale is a measure of symbolic racism created by Donald Kinder and Lynn M. Sanders for the American National Election Studies in the 1980s. It has been considered the dominant measure of symbolic racism since its inception.

== History ==
The racial resentment scale was developed in the 1980s by Donald Kinder and Lynn M. Sanders, who developed it on behalf of the American National Election Study. In 2020, a review listed it as the dominant measure of symbolic racism in the decades since its creation. It has also been called the most commonly utilized measure of racial resentment. The scale has three pillars: anti-black affect, belief in the idea that African Americans have not conformed to the Protestant work ethic, and denial of ongoing discrimination against African Americans.

== Purpose and structure ==
Results of a YouGov poll after the 2016 US presidential campaign. Sample size 1000. Date: December 6–7, 2016

Kinder and Sanders defined racial resentment as "the conjunction of whites' feelings towards blacks and their support for American values, especially secularized versions of the Protestant ethic". They referred to racial resentment as "new racism", stating that it was less a belief in the innate inferiority of African Americans, but rather, the notion that they do not live up to American values like Protestant morality and a hard work ethic. Thus, the racial resentment scale's stated purpose was to identify White Americans who were "generally sympathetic" to Black Americans, or conversely, unsympathetic.

The standard racial resentment scale is a list of four statements, with respondents indicating how strongly they agree or disagree with each one:

1. Irish, Italian, and Jewish ethnicities overcame prejudice and worked their way up. Blacks should do the same without any special favors.
2. Generations of slavery and discrimination have created conditions that make it difficult for blacks to work their way out of the lower class.
3. Over the past few years, blacks have gotten less than they deserve.
4. It's really a matter of some people just not trying hard enough: if blacks would only try harder they could be just as well off as whites.

In the expanded version, a further two statements are included:

1. Government officials usually pay less attention to a request or complaint from a black person than from a white person
2. Most blacks who receive money from welfare programs could get along without it if they tried

== Results and effectiveness ==
In the US, surveys have found that typically, Republicans score higher on the scale than Democrats. Additionally, in the 2016 United States presidential election, supporters of then-candidate Donald Trump had higher racial resentment scores than supporters of other Republican candidates. The racial resentment scale has been criticized for not separating racism from ideas like conservatism or individualism. Some political scientists have attributed Republicans' higher resentment scores to the fact that they typically favor less government intervention; they are more averse to government assistance to the poor, regardless of race. Believers in the Just-world fallacy, who therefore believe that one's fate is morally fair and a direct result of one's own actions, also score higher on the racial resentment scale.

Given the scale's original definition as measuring the feelings of whites towards blacks, very few studies have used responses to the scale by blacks. However, according to a 2023 study, the racial resentment scale can largely explain also black support for Trump in both the 2016 and 2020 elections.

Several studies have found that racial resentment scores are lower among younger Americans.

The wording of the statements has been criticized for being vague or otherwise imprecise. For example, in the statement, "Over the past few years, blacks have gotten less than they deserve," it is not stated what Black Americans have gotten less of, or relative to whom.

In 1997, Paul Sniderman and Ed Carmines reported in Reaching Beyond Race the results of an experiment where they switched the beneficiary from Blacks to New Immigrants. They find that both Whites and Blacks' opposition to special favors remains unchanged, suggesting that the opposition is not rooted in racism.

According to a 2021 study, measures of explicit anti-black prejudice predicted discrimination by white Americans against blacks during an Ultimatum Game, but racial resentment did not.
