= Ansolabehere =

Ansolabehere, Frenchified as Ansolabéhère, is a Basque surname. Notable people with the surname include:

- Joe Ansolabehere (born 1959), American television writer and producer
- Stephen Ansolabehere, American political scientist and academic
