= Robert E. Lane =

American political scientist (1917–2017)

Robert E. Lane (August 19, 1917 in Philadelphia – December 2017) was an American political scientist and political psychologist. He was the Eugene Meyer Professor Emeritus of Political Science at Yale University. Lane taught there for nearly 50 years; during that time, he twice headed the department and helped lead the shift towards behavioralism.

== Awards and other honors ==
Lane was a Corresponding Fellow of the British Academy (1995) as well as the American Association for the Advancement of Science.

He was a past President of the American Political Science Association, as well as of the International Society of Political Psychology. He was also a research associate at Yale's Institution for Social and Policy Studies, and has been a visiting scholar at Oxford and Cambridge Universities, the London School of Economics, and the Australian National University, among others.

Books of Professor Lane's have been translated into Swedish, Spanish, Portuguese, Japanese, and Hungarian (and portions of books into French and Chinese). Political Ideology received the Philip Converse Book Award in 2008. Since 1994, the American Political Science Association has given the Robert E. Lane Award for the best book in political psychology published in the past year, which his own book—The Loss of Happiness in Market Democracies—received in 2001.

== Scholarship ==
Lane described his research as having been organized around seven questions:

1. How do businessmen adapt to government regulation, in comparison to laborers adapting to working conditions?
2. Why do people get involved in politics, and why is American political apathy so stark?
3. Why do people choose the political ideologies they do, beyond the rationalizations given?
4. Why doesn’t the philosophy of science apply to all scholarly inquiries, for example, literature?
5. Given that the people society produces are the most important of all social products, what is the effect on human personality of major institutions, such as the market?
6. Does the market actually maximize ‘utility’ or happiness, as is claimed in justification for laissez-faire policies of production and resource allocation?
7. How will the transition from affluent consumerism to climate change policies change our institutions, values, and quality of life?

== Activism ==
Lane led a lifetime of self-described "timid" activism: as an adolescent, as a college and graduate student at Harvard University, as a professor at Yale and as a retiree (a colleague likening him to the image of "the Hollywood version of a tireless professor"). He was the President of the American Student Union, as well as its Harvard chapter, during which time he helped organize the first union for waitresses and busboys (challenging the University Treasurer in the process). He organized the Harvard Student Refugee Committee to convince Harvard to offer scholarships to hundreds of student refugees following Kristallnacht (commended in a letter by President Franklin D. Roosevelt for his efforts, and with NY Times coverage yielding further attention and donations); he extended this to countries nationwide through the Intercollegiate Committee to Aid Student Refugees and with support from the Warburg family of bankers.

He organized for the United Rubber Workers Union (for which he was arrested) and joined the third of the Selma to Montgomery marches. He was also a World War II veteran in the Air Force, and supported ROTC on campus arguing that they would have protected civil rights protesters against violent crowds. He celebrated the meritocratic shift in admissions under Yale President Kingman Brewster, Jr.

He was the founder of the National Senior Conservation Corps (Gray is Green), which promotes and organizes ecofriendly practices at some fifty retirement communities nationwide, involving residents in what he calls "oldternships". His work with Gray is Green has been recognized with a Connecticut Governor's Climate Change Leadership Award in 2008 as well as an Encore.org Purpose Prize Fellowship in 2009.

== Bibliography ==
- 1952, Problems in American Government, (Englewood Cliffs, N.J.: Prentice-Hall)
  - 1967, Third ed. with Fred Greenstein and James David Barber
- 1954, The Regulation of Businessmen, New Haven: Yale University Press
  - 1966, New Haven: Archon
- 1959, Political Life: Why People Get Involved in Politics, Glencoe, Ill.: Free Press
- 1961, The Liberties of Wit: Humanism, Criticism, and the Civic Mind, New Haven: Yale University Press
  - 1970, New Haven: Archon
- 1962, Political Ideology: Why the American Common Man Believes What He Does, New York: Free Press
- 1962, with James David Barber and Fred Greenstein, An Introduction to Political Analysis: Teacher's Manual, Englewood Cliffs, NJ: Prentice-Hall
- 1964, with David O. Sears, Public Opinion, Englewood Cliffs, NJ: Prentice-Hall
  - 1969, Swedish translation, Stockholm: Wahlström & Widstrand
  - 1967, Spanish translation, Barcelona: Fontanella
  - 1966, Portuguese translation, Rio de Janeiro: Zahar
- 1969, Political Thinking and Consciousness, Chicago: Markham (Rand McNally)
  - 1983, Japanese translation, by Yoshinoku Araki, Hirochika Otani, and Etsushi Tanifuji
- 1972, Political Man, New York: Free Press
- 1991, The Market Experience, New York: Cambridge University Press
- 2000, The Loss of Happiness in Market Democracies, New Haven: Yale University Press
  - 2003, Hungarian translation, Budapest: Europa Konyvkiado
- 2006, After the End of History: The Curious Fate of American Materialism, Ann Arbor, MI: University of Michigan Press
- 2015, Are Humans Misfits in Market Democracies?: The Spinach Pie Papers, Takeaway Two,

For his articles, some available online, at his ResearchGate profile and listed in his Vita.
