= Donata Francescato =

Italian psychologist

- Born: April 17, 1944 (age 82); Arona, Italy
- Education: Rice University; University of Houston, Texas
- Occupation: Psychologist

Donata Francescato (born April 17, 1944 in Arona, Italy) is an Italian community psychologist and academic, trained in the United States, and known in academia and the media for her work on sex roles, communes, and personal and organizational empowerment. Her work in community psychology led to the discipline being recognized in 1985 as a compulsory subject in Italian universities where psychology is taught as a major subject.

Francescato is currently the Scientific Director of the post-graduate School of Specialization in clinical community psychology and psychotherapy at ASPIC (Associazione per lo Sviluppo Psicologico dell'Individuo e della Comunità, Association for the Psychological Development of the Individual and the Community). Previously, she was a Full Professor of Community Psychology at the University of Rome, a position she retired from in 2014 at the age of 70.

== Background ==
Francescato earned her B.A. in French literature from Rice University in 1967. She later went on to receive an M.A. in French literature from Rice University in 1970, and a PhD in clinical psychology from the University of Houston in 1972. Her post-doctoral fellowship was undertaken at Brandeis University as a research associate in the Sociology department.

Upon her return to Italy, she wrote the first Italian textbook on community psychology and co-founded Effe, a feminist magazine active from 1972 to 1982. She also co-founded the European Network of Community Psychologists (ENCP) which gave birth to the European Association Community Association (ECPA). She is a member of the editorial boards of the Journal of Community and Applied Social Psychology, the Global Journal of Community Psychology Practice, Psicologia di Comunità (Community Psychology) and Psicoterapia Familiare (Family Psychotherapy).

During her academic career Francescato developed the concept and practice of innovative online teaching methodologies to teach professional competences using computer-supported collaborative learning. She also developed intervention methodologies to promote individual, group, organizational and community empowerment, as well as many intervention programs for the empowerment of women, immigrants and members of disadvantaged communities. One prong of her research involves evaluating these methodologies.

== Contributions ==
Francescato's contributions fall in three main areas. In women's studies, she investigates sex roles in families and communes; gender differences among activists, local and national politicians; dual career families; single childrearing; and separation and divorce processes. She is currently studying gender differences in aging processes, studying triads of caregiver/elder/most involved relative, as well as triads of grandparent/parent/adult grandchild, for effects on systemic wellbeing and intergenerational solidarity.

In the field of theory-grounded intervention methodologies, she investigates: personal empowerment using traditional media and online social networks; organizational empowerment through participatory multidimensional organizational analysis; and community empowerment through multidimensional profiling.

Lastly, in the field of teaching professional competences, she evaluates the comparative efficacy of face-to-face and online methodologies.

Her most recent work, published in English, summarizes the lessons of community psychology for the future, indicating how the aims and methods of the field can promote understanding and heal divisions across political and social divides.

== Bibliography ==
=== Books ===
Francescato has published 25 books, including the following.

==== On gender studies ====
- Francescato, D. & Francescato G. (1974). Famiglie Aperte: la comune, (Open families: the commune).Milano: Feltrinelli.
- Francescato, D. (1992, republished with new introductions in 2002 and in 2012). Quando l’amore finisce (When Love Ends). Bologna: Il Mulino. Translated in Spanish and Portuguese.
- Francescato, D. (1994).Figli sereni di amori smarriti. Ragazzi e adulti dopo la separazione (Serene Children of Lost Loves: Children and Adults after Parental Separation). Milano:Mondadori. Republished in 2012, Milano: Corriere della Sera. Translated in Spanish and Portuguese.
- Francescato, D. & Pasini, W. (1999). Il coraggio di cambiare (The Courage to Change). Milano: Mondadori. Translated in Portuguese, Spanish, French, Japanese and (in press) Chinese.

==== On community psychology ====
- Francescato, D. (1977). Psicologia di comunita’ (Community Psychology). Milano: Feltrinelli.
- Francescato, D., Putton, A. & Cudini S. (1986). Star bene insieme a scuola.Strategie per un’educazione socio-affettiva dalle materne alla media inferiore. (Getting Along Together in Schools: Strategies of Socio-affective Education from Nursery to Junior High School). Roma: Carocci. (Twenty reprintings, latest 2016).
- Francescato, D., Tomai, M. & Ghirelli, G. (2002).Fondamenti di psicologia di comunita’. (Foundations of Community Psychology). Roma: Carocci.
- Francescato, D., Tomai, M. & Mebane, M. (2004). Psicologia di comunità per la scuola, la formazione e l’orientamento. Esperienze faccia a faccia e online (Community Psychology for School, Training and Orientation: Face-to Face and Online Experiences). Bologna: Il Mulino. Translated in Spanish.
- Francescato, D., Tomai, M. & Solimeno A. (2008). Lavorare e decidere meglio in organizzazioni empowered e empowering (Working and Deciding in Empowering and Empowered Organizations). Roma: Carocci.

==== Chapters in books ====
- Francescato D. (2017) “A critical look at globalization processes and at the internationalization of community psychology.” In M. Bond, C. Keys & I. Serrano-Garcia (eds), APA (American Psychological Association) Handbook of Community Psychology, APA Handbooks in Psychology, Washington D.C, Vol. 1, pp. 485–501.
- Francescato D., Mebane M., Tomai M., Benedetti M., & Rosa V. (2012). “Promoting social capital, empowerment and counter-stereotypical behavior in male and female students in online CSCL communities.” In: H. Cuadra Montiel (ed). Globalization, vol. 1, InTech, pp. 75–108.
- Francescato D., Arcidiacono C., Albanesi C. & Mannarini T. (2007), “Community psychology in Italy: past developments and future perspectives.” In S. Reich, M. Riemer, I. Prilleltensky, & M. Montero (eds) History and Theories in Community Psychology. An International Perspective. Kluwer/Sprinter, pp. 263–281.

=== Journal articles ===
Listed below are a selection from Francescato's most recent journal articles.

- Francescato D., Pezzuti L., Mebane M., Tomai M., Benedetti M., & Moro A. (2016). "Dispositional characteristics, relational well-being and perceived life satisfaction and empowerment of elders." Aging & Mental Health.
- Francescato D. & Aber M. (2015). "Learning from organizational theory to build organizational empowerment." Journal of Community Psychology.
- Francescato D. & Mebane M.(2015). "Learning innovative methodologies to foster personal, organizational and community empowerment through online and face-to-face community psychology courses." Universitas Psychologica.
- Francescato D. & Zani B. (2013). "Community psychology practice competencies in undergraduate and graduate programs in Italy." Global Journal of Community Psychology Practice.
- Caprara G.V., Francescato D., Mebane M., Sorace R., & Vecchione M. (2010). "Personality Foundations of ideological divide: A comparison of women members of parliament and women voters in Italy." Political Psychology.
- Francescato D. & Zani B. (2010). "Community psychology in Europe: more needed, less wanted." Journal of Community and Applied Social Psychology.
