= Lauren Davenport =

American political scientist

Lauren Davenport is an American political scientist. She is Associate Professor of Political Science at Stanford University. Her research focuses on American politics with a particular focus on race and ethnicity.

Her 2018 book Politics Beyond Black and White won the International Society of Political Psychology David Sears Best Book Award. Her 2016 study in the American Sociological Review showed that daughters of biracial couples were more likely to identify as multi-racial than sons.

She has a PhD in Politics from Princeton University.
