= Folk theory of democracy =

Political folk belief

The folk theory of democracy is the belief system that the voting public supports, elects and embraces candidates who reflect the collective "wishes and desires" of the people. The idea is extracted from the 2016 book, Democracy for Realists; where Christopher Achen and Larry Bartels argue that "the idea that citizens make coherent and intelligible policy decisions, on which governments then act, bears no relationship to how democracy actually works—or could ever work".

== Origins ==
The folk theory of democracy draws its ideas from longstanding democratic thought, particularly the idea that political authority originates from the people. Political theorists such as John Locke and Jean-Jacques Rousseau stressed popular sovereignty and the general will as sources of legitimate rule. This theory was formalized by Achen and Bartels as a critique of 20th century political models such as Anthony Downs's economic theory of democracy and retrospective voting theories advanced by scholars like V. O. Key Jr.

This theory gained popularity in the late 20th and 21st century amid research on voter ignorance and partisanship, influenced by works such as Philip Converse's studies on public opinion and Morris Fiorina's retrospective voting model.

Using data from U.S. elections, Achen and Bartels showed that social identity and economic retrospection are the main drivers of electoral outcomes as opposed to policy reasoning.

== Criticism ==
Some academics have criticized folk theory of democracy for its unrealistic standards, perpetuating myths that hinder effective governance and obscure elite influence. Others have defended modified versions of it, arguing that citizens have sufficient heuristics for functional democracy.

== Read more ==
- Retrospective voting
- Public opinion
- Procedural democracy
- Polyarchy
- Identity politics
- Elizabeth Theiss-Morse
- John Hibbing
