= David O. Sears =

American psychologist

- Born: June 24, 1935 (age 91); Urbana, Illinois
- Citizenship: United States
- Education: Stanford University; Yale University
- Known for: Symbolic racism; Political socialization; Attitudes formation and change; Intergroup relations
- Awards: APSA Warren E. Miller Prize (2002); ISPP Harold D. Lasswell Award (1995); AAAS Fellow (1991)
- Scientific career
- Fields: Psychology; Political Science
- Workplaces: University of California, Los Angeles
- Doctoral advisor: Howard Leventhal
- Other academic advisors: H. Stuart Hughes

David O’Keefe Sears (born June 24, 1935, in Urbana, Illinois) is an American psychologist who specializes in political psychology. He is a distinguished professor of psychology and political science at the University of California, Los Angeles (UCLA) where he has been teaching since 1961. He served as dean of social sciences at UCLA between 1983 and 1992. Best known for his theory of symbolic racism, Sears has published many articles and books about the political and psychological origins of race relations in America, as well as on political socialization and life cycle effects on attitudes, the role of self-interest in attitudes, and multiculturalism. He was elected a fellow of the American Academy of Arts and Sciences in 1991.

== Personal life and academic career ==
Sears was born on June 24, 1935, in Urbana, Illinois, to the psychologists Pauline ("Pat") K. Snedden Sears and Robert Richardson Sears. He has a younger sister, Nancy Sears Barker. When he was one year old, the Sears family moved to New Haven, Connecticut as Robert Sears took up a position at Yale University, staying there until 1942; because of this early move to New Haven from Urbana, Sears considers the former as his home city. He has also lived in Iowa City, Iowa, Cambridge, Massachusetts, and Portola Valley, California during his childhood and youth as his parents moved to academic positions at different universities.

Sears went to Belmont High School and graduated in 1953. He graduated from Stanford University in 1957 with an AB in history with a minor in psychology; he presented, under the H. Stuart Hughes' guidance, a thesis on the Nazi mobilization of the youth. He then received both a MS in 1959 and a PhD in psychology in 1962 from Yale University with the dissertation "Anticipated criticism, opinion structure, and opinion change" having Howard Leventhal as his advisor. At Yale, he also worked with and was mentored by political scientist Robert E. Lane serving as research assistant in Lane's research on political attitudes and behavior published in his book Political Ideology.

He joined the Department of Psychology at the University of California, Los Angeles as an acting assistant professor in 1961 just after having filed his dissertation in December 1961, became an assistant professor in 1962, published his first article—a study of punishment in the white rat—in 1964, and was promoted to associate professor of psychology in 1967. From 1967 to 1968, Sears was a visiting lecturer at Harvard University. He was promoted to associate professor of psychology and political science in 1969, and to full professor of psychology and political science in 1971. He was a visiting professor of political science at the University of California, Berkeley from 1972 to 1973. He served as the dean of social sciences at the UCLA College of Letters and Science from 1983 to 1992, and was the director at the UCLA Institute for Social Science Research from 1993 to 2008.

Sears was awarded the Edward L. Bernays Foundation Psychology and Social Issues Book Award in 1975 for The Politics of Violence: The New Urban Blacks and the Watts Riot co-authored with John B. McConahay. He also received the Gordon Allport Intergroup Relations Prize from The Society for the Psychological Study of Social Issues in 1978 for his paper Symbolic Racism versus Racial Threats to 'The Good Life', co-authored with Donald R. Kinder. Sears became a fellow of the American Academy of Arts and Sciences in 1991. He served as the president of the International Society of Political Psychology in 1994–95, received the Harold D. Lasswell Award from the ISPP for his "distinguished scientific contribution in the field of political psychology" in 1995 and the Warren E. Miller Award from the American Political Science Association for his "lifetime intellectual accomplishment and service to the profession in the elections, public opinion, and voting behavior field" in 2002. In 2012, the ISPP established the David O. Sears Award in his honor. The Sears Award has been given for the best book published in the field of the political psychology of mass politics in the previous year.

He teaches graduate and undergraduate level courses in political psychology at UCLA and coordinate the UCLA Political Psychology Lab. His graduate laboratory on political psychology brings together students from different fields to explore and discuss contemporary research on political psychological topics as political socialization, race and ethnicity, political participation, and public opinion.

He married Cynthia Lovelace in 1961, divorcing in 1970. In 2004, he married his former student, and girlfriend, Carrie Powers, who died October 29, 2010. He has three daughters, Juliet, Olivia, Meredith. He lives in Pacific Palisades, California and spends his summer vacations in Lake Winnipesaukee, Moultonborough, New Hampshire.

== Research ==
=== Symbolic politics ===
The symbolic politics theory argues that symbolic predispositions evoke longstanding affective responses rather than rational self-interest calculations as powerful causes of opinions and behaviors.

Self interest is defined as the "(1) short-to-medium term impact of an issue (or candidacy) on the (2) material well-being of the (3) individual's own personal life (or that of his or her immediate family)." Self-interest does not include long-term interest, nonmaterial—social or psychological—elements of well-being or group-related benefits. Self-interest is contrasted to "symbolic predisposition" as partisanship, ideology, or beliefs. Sears' theory of symbolic politics argues that these symbolic predispositions are formed early in life and are stable, and so are not correlated with self-interest.

With few exceptions throughout the literature, symbolic predispositions has presented more substantive and statistical explanatory power on attitudes and behaviors than self-interest. Only in occasional exceptions, as when there are clear and substantial stakes as job cuts or regarding tax burdens or ambiguous and dangerous threats as compulsory military draft lottery, self-interest has a clear effect on political attitudes and behavior. Even in these cases, the impact of self-interest are quite specific to the issues in question.

=== Symbolic racism ===
Sears' theory of symbolic racism was developed during the decade of 1970 and further refined. His theory has been developed and used in the analysis of new forms of racism in the United States that emerged especially after the Civil Rights movements of the 1960s. According to Sears' theory of symbolic racism, a subtle form of racism replaced the Jim Crow or "old-fashioned racism". Instead of the open prejudice, based on beliefs in the biological inferiority of Blacks and support for formal segregation and discrimination, the symbolic racism is a more abstract set of beliefs comprising a “blend” of primitive anti-Black affect with traditional American moral values.

As defined by Kinder and Sears,

Symbolic racism represents a form of resistance to change in the racial status quo based on moral feelings that blacks violate such traditional American values as individualism and self-reliance, the work ethic, obedience, and discipline. Whites may feel that people should be rewarded on their merits, which in turn should be based on hard work and diligent service. Hence symbolic racism should find its most vociferous expression on political issues that involve 'unfair' government assistance to blacks: welfare ('welfare cheats could find work if they tried'); 'reverse discrimination' and racial quotas ('blacks should not be given a status they have not earned'); 'forced' busing ('whites have worked hard for their neighborhoods, and for their neighborhood schools'); or 'free' abortions for the poor ('if blacks behaved morally, they would not need abortions').

The symbolic racism is an effort to understand whites' continuing resistance to efforts and policies aiming to decrease racial inequality despite the decline of the level of overt racism in the US.

Although slightly revised versions of the theory symbolic racism have appears in the literature under label like “modern racism” and “racial resentment”, they have been operationalized empirically with similar survey items. The symbolic racism and its variants have been the most widely used measures of explicit racism in the last three decades.

Despite the fact that symbolic racism is conceptualized as a “blend” of anti-Blacks affect with traditional American values, it has been presenting an independent explanatory power explaining White's racial policy attitudes even when controlled for other items (different from those used in its scale) measuring either racism or traditional/conservative values.

== Academic positions ==
- 1961–1962: Acting Assistant Professor of Psychology, University of California, Los Angeles
- 1962–1967: Assistant Professor of Psychology, University of California, Los Angeles
- 1967–1969: Associate Professor of Psychology, University of California, Los Angeles
- 1967–1968: Visiting Lecturer in Social Psychology, Harvard University
- 1969–1971: Associate Professor of Psychology and Political Science, University of California, Los Angeles
- 1971–present: Professor of Psychology and Political Science, University of California, Los Angeles
- 1972–1973: Visiting Professor of Political Science, University of California, Berkeley
- 1983–1984: Guest Scholar, Brookings Institution, Washington, D.C.
- 1983–1992: Dean of Social Sciences, College of Letters and Science, University of California, Los Angeles
- 1988–1989: Fellow, Center for Advanced Study in the Behavioral Sciences
- 1992–1993: Fellow, Center for Advanced Study in the Behavioral Sciences
- 1993–2008: Director, Institute for Social Science Research, University of California, Los Angeles

== Notable and emerging students ==
- Donald Kinder, James Orin Murfin and Philip E. Converse Collegiate Professor of Psychology and Political Science at the University of Michigan, Ann Arbor. Co-authored several articles and book chapters, including award-winner article "Symbolic Racism versus Racial Threats to 'The Good Life'".
- Nicholas A. Valentino, Professor of Political Science at the University of Michigan, Ann Arbor.
- Carolyn L. Funk, Associate Professor of Government and Public Affairs at Virginia Commonwealth University.
- Richard R. Lau, Professor of Political Science at Rutgers University. Co-edited the book Political Cognition.
- Leonie Huddy, Professor of Political Science at Stony Brook University. Co-edited the Oxford Handbook of Political Psychology.
- Tom R. Tyler, University Professor of Psychology at New York University.
- Peter Ditto, Professor of Psychology & Social Behavior at the University of California, Irvine.
- Caryl Rusbult, Professor of Social and Organizational Psychology at the Vrije Universiteit.
- Ronald Abeles, Special Assistant to the Director of the Office of Behavioral and Social Sciences Research at the National Institutes of Health.
- John P. McConahay, Professor of Psychology at Yale University. Co-authored The Politics of Violence: The New Urban Blacks and the Watts Riot.
- P. J. Henry, Associate Professor of Psychology at New York University Abu Dhabi.
- Michael Tesler, Assistant Professor of Political Science at Brown University. Co-authored Obama's Race: The 2008 Election and the Dream of a Post-Racial America.

== Awards and recognition ==
- Edward L. Bernays Foundation Psychology and Social Issues Book Award for "The Politics of Violence: The New Urban Blacks and the Watts Riot." 1975. (with J. B. McConahay).
- Gordon Allport Intergroup Relations Prize for "Symbolic Racism versus Racial Threats to 'The Good Life'," 1978. (with D. R. Kinder).
- Katz-Newcomb Annual Lecture in Social Psychology, University of Michigan, 1988.
- John Simon Guggenheim Memorial Foundation Fellowship, 1988–1989.
- Fellow, American Academy of Arts and Sciences, 1991–present.
- Keynote address, annual meeting of the Society for Personality and Social Psychology, 1991.
- Guest Specialist, Summer Institute in Political Psychology, Ohio State University, July 1991.
- Ernst Fraenkel Lecture, John F. Kennedy-Institut fur Nordamerikastudien der Freien Universitat Berlin, 1991.
- President, Society for the Advancement of Socio-Economics, 1991–1992.
- Ida Beam Lecture, University of Iowa, 1992.
- President, International Society of Political Psychology, 1994–1995.
- Harold D. Lasswell Award, International Society of Political Psychology, 1995.
- Warren E. Miller Prize, American Political Science Association, 2002.
- Miller-Converse Lecture, University of Michigan, 2004.

== In the popular press ==
Appearances in the popular media include:

- On April 22, 2011, David O. Sears discussed in The New York Times the racialization of 2008 presidential election and the role of racial resentment as a predictor of candidate choice.
- In an interview to the newsletter UCLA Today, David O. Sears discussed the impact of multicultural environments and institutions on reducing racial bias.

== Published works ==
=== Books ===
- Lane, Robert E.; David O. Sears (1964). Public Opinion. Englewood Cliffs, NJ: Prentice Hall, Inc. OCLC 255504.
- Freedman, Jonathan L.; David O. Sears; J. Merrill Carlsmith (1970). Social Psychology. Englewood Cliffs, NJ: Prentice Hall, Inc. OCLC 79448.
- Freedman, Jonathan L.; Carlsmith, J. Merrill; Sears, David O., eds. (1971). Readings in Social Psychology. Englewood Cliffs, NJ: Prentice Hall, Inc. ISBN 9780137610723. OCLC 137568.
- Sears, David O.; John B. McConahay (1973). The Politics of Violence: The New Urban Blacks and the Watts Riot. Boston, MA: Houghton Mifflin. OCLC 745837.
- Sears, David O.; Richard E. Whitney (1973). Political Persuasion. Morristown, NJ: General Learning Press.
- Freedman, Jonathan L.; J. Merrill Carlsmith; David O. Sears (1974). Social Psychology (2nd ed.). Englewood Cliffs, NJ: Prentice Hall, Inc.
- Freedman, Jonathan L.; David O. Sears; J. Merrill Carlsmith (1978). Social Psychology (3rd ed.). Englewood Cliffs, NJ: Prentice Hall, Inc.
- Freedman, Jonathan L.; David O. Sears; J. Merrill Carlsmith (1981). Social Psychology (4th ed.). Englewood Cliffs, NJ: Prentice Hall, Inc.
- Sears, David O.; Jack Citrin (1982). Tax Revolt: Something for Nothing in California. Cambridge, MA: Harvard University Press. ISBN 9780674868359. OCLC 7977175.
- Sears, David O.; Jonathan L. Freedman; Letitia A. Peplau (1985). Social Psychology (5th ed.). Englewood Cliffs, NJ: Prentice Hall, Inc.
- Sears, David O.; Jack Citrin (1985). Tax Revolt: Something for Nothing in California (Enlarged ed.). Cambridge, MA: Harvard University Press. ISBN 9780674868359. OCLC 786934617.
- Lau, Richard R; Sears, David O., eds. (1986). Political Cognition: The 19th Annual Carnegie Symposium on Cognition. Hillsdale, NJ: Erlbaum Associates. ISBN 9780898596526. OCLC 12079909.
- Sears, David O.; Letitia A. Peplau; Jonathan L. Freedman; Shelley E. Taylor (1988). Social Psychology (6th ed.). Englewood Cliffs, NJ: Prentice Hall, Inc.
- Peplau, Letitia A.; Sears, David O.; Taylor, Shelley E.; et al., eds. (1988). Readings in Social Psychology: Classic and Contemporary Contributions. Englewood Cliffs, NJ: Prentice Hall, Inc. OCLC 17441386.
- Sears, David O.; Letitia A. Peplau; Shelley E. Taylor (1991). Social Psychology (7th ed.). Englewood Cliffs, NJ: Prentice Hall, Inc.
- Sears, David O.; Letitia A. Peplau; Shelley E. Taylor (1994). Social Psychology (8th ed.). Englewood Cliffs, NJ: Prentice Hall, Inc.
- Sears, David O.; Letitia A. Peplau; Shelley E. Taylor (1996). Social Psychology (9th ed.). Englewood Cliffs, NJ: Prentice Hall, Inc.
- Sears, David O.; Sidanius, Jim; Bobo, Lawrence, eds. (2000). Racialized Politics: The Debate About Racism in America. Chicago, IL: The University of Chicago Press. ISBN 9780226744056. OCLC 41612398.
- Taylor, Shelley E.; Letitia A. Peplau; David O. Sears (2000). Social Psychology (10th ed.). Englewood Cliffs, NJ: Prentice Hall, Inc. ISBN 9780130213365.
- Taylor, Shelley E.; Letitia A. Peplau; David O. Sears (2003). Social Psychology (11th ed.). Englewood Cliffs, NJ: Prentice Hall, Inc.
- Sears, David O.; Huddy, Leonie; Jervis, Robert, eds. (2003). Oxford Handbook of Political Psychology. New York, NY: Oxford University Press. ISBN 9780199729340. OCLC 50404137.
- Taylor, Shelley E.; Letitia A. Peplau; David O. Sears (2005). Social Psychology (12th ed.). Englewood Cliffs, NJ: Prentice Hall, Inc.
- Sidanius, Jim; Shana Levin; Colette Van Laar; David O. Sears (2008). The Diversity Challenge: Social Identity and Intergroup Relations on the College Campus. Chicago, IL: The University of Chicago Press. ISBN 9780871547934. OCLC 227192118.
- Tesler, Michael; David O. Sears (2008). Obama's Race: The 2008 Election and the Dream of a Post-Racial America. New York, NY: Russell Sage Foundation. ISBN 9780226793832. OCLC 587209565.
- Sears, David O.; Huddy, Leonie; Levy, Jack S. (eds.). Oxford Handbook of Political Psychology. in press (2nd ed.). New York, NY: Oxford University Press.

=== Selected articles and book chapters ===
- Sears, David O. (1969). "Black Attitudes Toward the Political System in the Aftermath of the Watts Insurrection" (PDF). Midwest Journal of Political Science. 13 (4): 515–544. doi:10.2307/2110070. JSTOR 2110070. Archived from the original (PDF) on July 11, 2010.
- Sears, David O. (1975). "Political Socialization" (PDF). In Greenstein, Fred I.; Polsby, Nelson W. (eds.). Handbook of Political Science, Vol. 2. Reading, MA: Addison-Wesley.
- Kinder, Donald R.; David O. Sears (1981). "Prejudice and Politics: Symbolic Racism versus Racial Threats to the Good Life" (PDF). Journal of Personality and Social Psychology. 40 (3): 414–431. doi:10.1037/0022-3514.40.3.414. Archived from the original (PDF) on September 6, 2012.
- Sears, David O. (1983). "The Person-Positivity Bias" (PDF). Journal of Personality and Social Psychology. 44 (2): 233–250. doi:10.1037/0022-3514.44.2.233. Archived from the original (PDF) on July 12, 2010.
- Sears, David O.; Carolyn L. Funk (1991). "The Role of Self-Interest in Social and Political Attitudes" (PDF). Advances in Experimental Social Psychology. 24: 1–91. doi:10.1016/s0065-2601(08)60327-5. ISBN 9780120152247. Archived from the original (PDF) on July 11, 2010.
- Sears, David O. (1993). "Symbolic Politics: A Socio-Psychological Theory" (PDF). In Iyengar, Shanto; McGuire, William J. (eds.). Explorations in Political Psychology. Durham, NC: Duke University Press.
- Sears, David O.; Nicholas A. Valentino (1997). "Politics Matters: Political Events as Catalysts for Preadult Socialization" (PDF). American Political Science Review. 91 (1): 45–65. CiteSeerX 10.1.1.540.4505. doi:10.2307/2952258. JSTOR 2952258. Archived from the original (PDF) on July 11, 2010.
- Sears, David O.; P. J. Henry (2005). "Over Thirty Years Later: A Contemporary Look at Symbolic Racism" (PDF). Advances in Experimental Social Psychology. 37: 95–130. doi:10.1016/s0065-2601(05)37002-x. ISBN 9780120152377. Archived from the original (PDF) on July 11, 2010.
- Sears, David O.; Nicholas A. Valentino (2005). "Old Times There Are Not Forgotten: Race and Partisan Realignment in the Contemporary South" (PDF). American Journal of Political Science. 49 (3): 672–688. doi:10.1111/j.1540-5907.2005.00136.x. Archived from the original (PDF) on July 11, 2010.
- Sears, David O.; Victoria Savalei (2006). "The Political Color Line in America: Many Peoples of Color or Black Exceptionalism?" (PDF). Political Psychology. 27 (6): 895–924. doi:10.1111/j.1467-9221.2006.00542.x. Archived from the original (PDF) on July 12, 2010.
