= Stanley Feldman =

Stanley Feldman may refer to:

- Stanley Feldman (political scientist), American professor of political science
- Stanley G. Feldman (born 1933), former Arizona Supreme Court judge
