= Roberta Sigel =

American political scientist

- Education: Greensboro College; Syracuse University; Clark University
- Scientific career
- Fields: Political science
- Workplaces: Wayne State University; University at Buffalo; Rutgers University

Roberta S. Sigel (January 6, 1916—October 25, 2008) was an American political scientist. Her research focused on political psychology, political socialization, and gender and politics. She extended research into the political socialization of children and adolescents to study how people learn about politics and develop their political orientations throughout adulthood. She spent much of her career as a distinguished professor of political science at Rutgers University.

== Early life and education ==
Sigel was born in Berlin on January 6, 1916. Her year of birth has also been given as 1917. In the mid-1930s, she emigrated to the United States to escape the rise of the Nazi Party. She first joined family in New Jersey, before attending Greensboro College, where she graduated with a B.A. degree in history. She then obtained a master's degree in history at Syracuse University, followed by a PhD in history and international relations at Clark University. While there, she married the psychologist Irving E. Sigel.

== Career ==
After Roberta Sigel's husband Irving Sigel completed his PhD at the University of Chicago, the two held a series of academic appointments. Roberta Sigel worked on the faculties of Wayne State University and the University at Buffalo before she became a Distinguished Professor at the Douglass College of Rutgers University in 1973.

Much of Sigel's research concerned the processes of political learning, socialization, and development. While working at Wayne State University, she published several studies on public opinion among voters in the Detroit region regarding John F. Kennedy. After the assassination of John F. Kennedy, Sigel conducted a survey of 1,349 children and adolescents to gauge the reaction of young people to the President's killing. In 1981, she coauthored The political involvement of adolescents with Marilyn B. Hoskin. Sigel and Hoskin examine the contributors to the political socialization of adolescents, asking what causes young people to become engaged in politics. The communications professor Timothy E. Cook commented that their view of engagement was unusually broad, encompassing not just the typical indicators of political attitudes but including emotional, cognitive, and behavioral features. Sigel and Hoskin argued that young people are driven to political involvement by a combination of their social status, personal characteristics, and the politicization of their environment.

Sigel was the editor in 1989 of Political learning in adulthood: A sourcebook of theory and research, which was noted for extending research on the political socialization of young people to instead address how political orientations are learned in adulthood.

In the early 1990s, Sigel began to work on the question of gender and politics, which represented a new direction in her research and resulted in the 1996 book Ambition and accommodation: How women view gender relations. The book made novel use of open-ended focus group interviews with 650 New Jersey residents to understand how men and women perceived the state of gender relations while they were undergoing dramatic changes. Beginning with the two hypotheses that men and women had largely moved past the traditional assumptions of men's innate superiority to women, but also that women still nevertheless were treated in many ways as though they were inferior to men, Sigel examined whether or not women felt aggrieved by their unfair treatment, and aimed to discover whom they blamed for it and whether it would prompt them to pursue collective action. The women interviewed in Ambition and accommodation largely did express aggrievement, but both women and men were more likely to blame the individual actions of men rather than systemic biases for women's negative experiences, and consequently many women in the study group favored individual responses to the problem and were not motivated to pursue political remedies. Amidst contemporary discussions about both the rise of feminism and an early 1990s backlash against feminism, Sigel's interviews instead largely showed resignation among women in New Jersey, who were more willing to provide rationalizations for the gender dynamics of their environment than to convert experiences into political action, while the men she interviewed frequently provided justifications for the sexist patterns they observed.

Sigel was also interested in German public opinion, stemming from her early experiences with political violence in Germany. She wrote on the topic, including for popular media.

Sigel was involved in the leadership of several political psychology organizations. She has been credited with the idea for the New York Area Political Psychology Meeting, and she was the President of the International Society of Political Psychology. The ISPP's award for the best conference paper by an early career member is named after Sigel.

Sigel retired in 1987, but continued to be active in research until she died in 2009.

== Selected works ==
- The political involvement of adolescents, with Marilyn Hoskin (1981)
- Political learning in adulthood: A sourcebook of theory and research, editor (1989)
- Ambition and accommodation: How women view gender relations (1996)
