= Kristen Monroe =

American political scientist

Kristen Renwick Monroe (born May 17, 1946) is an American political scientist, specializing in political psychology and ethics. Her work on altruism and moral choice is presented in a trilogy of books in which Monroe argues that our sense of self in relation to others sets and delineates the range of choice options we find available, not just morally but cognitively.

Monroe has taught at the University of British Columbia, New York University, SUNY at Stony Brook, and Princeton University. Monroe is a professor of political science and the Founder and Director of UCI's Ethics Center.

== Early life and education ==
Monroe was born on May 17, 1946, in Princeton, Illinois, to Gertrude Awilda Renwick Monroe, a teacher, and James Oliver Monroe Jr., a lawyer hearing war crimes in the Pacific. Monroe graduated with honors from Smith College, where she attended the University of Geneva and the Graduate Institute of International Studies in Geneva in her junior year. She did her graduate work at the University of Chicago, where she received her MA in international relations (1970) and PhD in political science (1974), after studying with Susanne and Lloyd Rudolph, Joseph Cropsey, Duncan MacRae, and Robert Fogel. Monroe was a Killam post-doctoral Fellow at the University of British Columbia, specializing in econometrics and political economy.

== Major works ==
The Heart of Altruism: Perceptions of a Common Humanity (1994) examines the psychological roots and political significance of altruism. Through interviews with philanthropists, Carnegie Hero Commission recipients, and Holocaust rescuers, Monroe contrasts their perspectives with entrepreneurs to challenge political theories based on self-interest. Her critique counters scholars like Gary Becker and Richard Dawkins, arguing that altruism cannot be dismissed to fit disciplinary paradigms.

The Hand of Compassion: Portraits of Moral Choice during the Holocaust (2004) continues Monroe's analysis of political behavior, highlighting how identity shapes moral choices. It explores how an altruistic perspective creates a sense of moral urgency, turning concern into action.

Ethics in an Age of Terror and Genocide: Identity and Moral Choice (2012) investigates the psychology of genocide, examining why some stand by while others intervene. Interviews with bystanders, Nazis, and rescuers reveal how identity influences moral decisions. Monroe argues that dehumanization enables genocide and that identity, rather than pure reason, drives moral action.

Monroe's work is credited with establishing microfoundations for the scientific study of ethics and revitalizing moral psychology. Her research also covers gender equality in academia, stem cell ethics, empirical political theory, interdisciplinary social science, and human resilience in war.

== Professional service ==
Monroe is the author or co-editor of 17 books and nearly 100 journal articles and book chapters. She served as President of The International Society of Political Psychology (2007–8) and as the Vice President of both the American Political Science Association and the Midwest Political Science Association. Currently, she is the Book Review Editor of Political Psychology. Monroe has served on the Editorial Boards of The Journal of Politics, Political Behavior, Journal of Theoretical Politics, Political Research Quarterly, International Journal of Politics, Culture and Society, and Political Psychology. A member of the UCI NSF Advance Grant, she currently serves on the NSF Advisory Board for the Advance Program PAID.

== Awards and honors ==
Monroe was awarded the 2013 Nevitt Sanford Award for Professional Contributions to Psychology by the International Society of Political Psychology and was a 2012-2013 Fellow at the Radcliffe Institute for Advanced Study at Harvard University. She delivered the 2012 Raoul Wallenberg Centennial Lectures for the Swedish Ministry of Culture and the 2011 Ernie and Lucha Vogel Moral Courage Lecture for Principia College. In 2010 the American Political Science Association awarded Monroe the Ithiel De Sola Pool Award and Lectureship for Outstanding Work in Political Science and the Goodnow Award for Service to the Profession. UCI has awarded Monroe the 2010 Paul Silverman Award for Distinguished Work in Ethics and the 2008 UCI Faculty Senate Award for Distinguished Research.

== Publications ==
- The Political Process and Economic Change (Editor). New York: Agathon Press, 1983. ISBN 0-87586-063-X
- The Economic Approach to Politics: A Critical Reassessment of the Theory of Rational Action. (Editor). New York: HarperCollins, 1991. ISBN 0-673-46426-1
- Political Economy and Political Psychology. (Editor) Special edition of Political Psychology. 16, 1 (March 1995).
- The Heart of Altruism: Perceptions of a Common Humanity. Princeton: Princeton University Press, 1996. ISBN 0-691-05847-4
- Contemporary Empirical Political Theory. (Editor) Berkeley, CA: University of California Press, 1997. ISBN 0-520-20725-4
- Political Psychology (Editor). Hillsdale, NJ: Lawrence Erlbaum, November 2002. ISBN 0-8058-3886-4
- The Hand of Compassion: Portraits of Moral Choice during the Holocaust. 2004. Princeton, NJ: Princeton University Press. ISBN 0-691-11863-9
- Perestroika! The Raucous Revolution in Political Science. (Editor). New Haven, CT: Yale University Press, 2005. ISBN 0-300-09981-9
- Fundamentals of the Stem Cell Debate: The Scientific, Religious, Ethical, and Political Issues. Co-edited with Ronald B. Miller and Jerome Tobis. University of California Press, in press 2007. ISBN 0-520-25212-8
- On Behalf of Others: The Psychology of Benevolence in a Global World. Edited volume with C.Kinnvall and Sarah Scuzzarello. Oxford U Press. 2009.
- Science, Ethics, and Politics: Conversations and Investigations. Edited volume with chapters by Francisco Ayala, Kenneth Arrow, Warren S. Brown, William Chiu, Joe DiMento, Gil Geis, Peter Hawkins Jennifer Hochschild, Cheryl Koopman, Nicholas Lampros, Chloe Lampros-Monroe, Adam Martin, Rose McDermott, Kristen Renwick Monroe, Gregory Peterson, Bridgette Portman, Thomas Schelling, Michael Spezio, Kevin Reimer, James Van Slyke, and Nicole Wernimont. Paradigm Press. 2011.
- Ethics in an Age of Terror and Genocide: Identity, Political Psychology and Moral Choice. Princeton U Press. 2012. ISBN 0-69115-143-1
- Interdisciplinarity: Its Role in a Discipline-based Academy. Oxford University Press. 2014. With Robert Alexrod, John Aldrich, Lisa Andersen, Karen Beckwith, and Matthew Moen. ISBN 0-19933-134-0
- A Darkling Plain: Humanity during War. Cambridge University Press. 2014. With Chloe Lampros-Monroe and Jonah Pellecchia and the assistance of Sif Heide-Ottosen, Shant Setrak Meguerditchian, and Students in Political Science 149C, Fall 2010. ISBN 1-10703-499-X
- On Ethics and Economics: Conversations with Kenneth Arrow. With Kenneth Arrow and Nicholas Lampros. Routledge. 2016. Foreword by Amartya Sen. ISBN 1-13867-605-5
