= Leonie Huddy =

American political scientist

- Education: Monash University; University of New England; University of California, Los Angeles
- Awards: Jeanne Knutson award, ISPP; Nevitt Sanford Award, ISPP; Best Paper, APSA Women and Politics Section
- Scientific career
- Fields: Political science
- Workplaces: Stony Brook University

Leonie Huddy is an Australian political scientist, currently a professor of political science at the State University of New York at Stony Brook. She studies American patriotism and national identity, public opinion regarding the Iraq War, and political identity in areas like attitudes towards feminism and gendered perceptions about political candidates.

== Education and early career ==
Huddy attended Monash University in Melbourne, graduating with a BSc in psychology and zoology in 1977. She then obtained a BSc in zoology in 1979 from the University of New England in Armidale, New South Wales, followed by an MSc in social psychology from the University of California, Los Angeles in 1983. She remained at UCLA to complete a PhD in social psychology in 1989. During her PhD, Huddy worked as a research consultant for the RAND corporation. Upon completing her PhD, Huddy was hired by Stony Brook University as a professor of political science.

== Career ==
Huddy coauthored the 2015 book Going to War in Iraq: When Citizens and the Press Matter with Stanley Feldman and George E. Marcus. Shana Kushner Gadarian summarized the book as "an in‐depth analysis of American public opinion and media coverage during the lead‐up to the Iraq War", which provides evidence counter to the popular narrative that the American media did not cover a diversity of viewpoints about the prospective war. Instead, they attribute the opposition of Democratic and Independent voters to the war as being the result of media coverage, rather than the often equivocal signalling of party elites.

In addition to her work on American patriotism, national identity, and responses to terrorism, Huddy has also published widely on perceptions of female candidates and the implications of political identities. Her research on topics like gender stereotypes about political candidates and on social identity theory have been widely cited, and her paper "The Social Nature of Political Identity: Feminist Image and Feminist Identity" received the Best Paper Award from the Women and Politics section of the American Political Science Association in 1999. Huddy was also an editor of the 2013 Oxford Handbook of Political Psychology.

Huddy has been involved in the leadership of several major organisations and journals in political psychology and public opinion. From 2005 until 2010, she was the co-editor of the journal Political Psychology, and she has also served on the editorial boards of other major journals like the American Political Science Review and the American Journal of Political Science. In 2010, she was also the President of the International Society of Political Psychology, and she has earned the Jeanne Knutson award for long-standing service to that society. In 2018 she joined the board that runs the American National Election Studies.

In 2019, a citation analysis by the political scientists Hannah June Kim and Grofman listed Huddy among the 40 most cited women who are active political science faculty members at an American university, as well as being among the 25 most cited American faculty members in the subfields of public policy, public administration, public law, or political psychology. Huddy's work has also been frequently cited in media outlets like The New York Times, The Washington Post, and The Atlantic.

== Selected works ==
- "Gender Stereotypes and the Perception of Male and Female Candidates", American Journal of Political Science, with Nayda Terkildsen (1993)
- "From Social to Political Identity: A Critical Examination of Social Identity Theory", Political Psychology (2002)
- Going to War in Iraq: When Citizens and the Press Matter, with Stanley Feldman and George E. Marcus (2015)

== Selected awards ==
- Best Paper Award, Women and Politics Section of the American Political Science Association (1999)
- Nevitt Sanford Award for professional contributions to political psychology (2014)
- Jeanne Knutson award for service to the International Society of Political Psychology (2016)
