= Eva G. T. Green =

Political scientist

- Education: University of Helsinki; University of Geneva; University of Lausanne
- Scientific career
- Fields: Political science; Political psychology; Social psychology
- Workplaces: University of California, Los Angeles; University of Utrecht; Umeå University; Vrije Universiteit Brussel; London School of Economics; University of Lausanne

Eva G. T. Green is a political scientist and political psychologist. She studies variation in political attitudes and values across countries. Green uses experimental social psychology to measure the attitudes that people across many countries and groups hold towards members of other groups, as manifested for example through xenophobia, beliefs about immigration, and strength of national identity.

== Education and positions ==
Green attended The University of Helsinki, where she graduated with a Bachelor of Social Science degree in 1995. In 1997, she obtained a graduate diploma in social psychology from The University of Helsinki. She then matriculated at The University of Geneva, where in 1998 she received a European diploma of advanced studies in social psychology. Then, in 2002, Green graduated from The University of Lausanne with a doctorate in social sciences.

After obtaining her PhD, Green spent 2 years as a researcher at the University of California, Los Angeles. In 2004, she moved to The University of Utrecht. She joined the faculty at The University of Lausanne as a professor in 2005. She has since held visiting or temporary positions at Umeå University, Vrije Universiteit Brussel, and The London School of Economics.

== Research ==
Green studies variation in social values across countries, focusing on patterns in attitudes towards immigration, xenophobia, and national identity. She has measured the variation in individualism and collectivism across countries, finding that clusters of respondents' beliefs can be described by a typology that measures how competitive an individual is and how mutually reliant an individual is.

Green has also probed the distinction between people who express a social dominance orientation and those who express a right-wing authoritarian orientation. Green has argued that for individuals whose motivation is social dominance, members of an out-group such as immigrants can provoke a negative response even when they are assimilated into the majority group because they blur the distinction between social groups; in contrast, those with an authoritarian motivation will be more resistant to immigrants who are not assimilated, because authoritarianism is motivated by an intolerance for difference between people. Her work has helped to demonstrate that social dominance orientation is a useful predictor of attitudes and behaviours across countries.

In addition to studying variation in peoples' attitudes within countries and between ethnic groups, Green has also studied gender differences in attitudes.

Green served a term as the President of the International Society of Political Psychology, ending in 2018. She also held the position of Vice President at the International Society of Political Psychology. She has been an editor of The European Journal of Social Psychology and The International Review of Social Psychology, and has been on the editorial board of several other journals including the British Journal of Social Psychology.

== Selected works ==
- "Variation of individualism and collectivism within and between 20 countries: A typological analysis", Journal of Cross-Cultural Psychology with Jean-Claude Deschamps and Dario Páez (2005)
- "We will hunt them down: How social dominance orientation and right-wing authoritarianism fuel ethnic persecution of immigrants in fundamentally different ways", Journal of Experimental Social Psychology, with Lotte Thomsen and Jim Sidanius (2008)
- "Ethnic minority-majority asymmetry in national attitudes around the world: A multilevel analysis", Political Psychology, with Christian Staerklé, Jim Sidanius, and Ludwin E. Molina (2010)
