= Us Against Them (book) =

2010 book by Donald Kinder and Cindy Kam

- Author: Donald Kinder, Cindy Kam
- Language: English
- Genre: Non-fiction
- Publisher: University of Chicago Press
- Publication date: 2010
- Publication place: United States

Us Against Them: Ethnocentric Foundations of American Opinion is a book of social science research by Donald Kinder and Cindy Kam published by the University of Chicago Press in 2010.

Us Against Them uses polling data to argue that white voters who identify as ethnic Americans strongly oppose those means-tested programs that they view as transferring wealth directly to members of racial and ethnic minority groups, including food stamps, welfare, and Temporary Assistance for Needy Families, but support programs they see as universal social-insurance, including Medicare and Social Security.
