= Lloyd in Space =

American animated television series

- Created by: Joe Ansolabehere; Paul Germain
- Directed by: Howy Parkins
- Voices of: Courtland Mead; April Winchell; Brian George; Justin Shenkarow; Pamela Hayden; Bill Fagerbakke; Pamela Adlon
- Composer: Jim Lang
- Country of origin: United States
- No. of seasons: 3
- No. of episodes: 39

Production
- Executive producers: Joe Ansolabehere; Paul Germain
- Producers: Howy Parkins; Bart Jennett (S2–3)
- Running time: 22 minutes
- Production companies: Walt Disney Television Animation; Paul & Joe Productions

Original release
- Network: ABC (Disney's One Saturday Morning)
- Release: February 3, 2001 – February 16, 2002
- Network: Disney Channel
- Release: October 1 – October 24, 2002
- Network: Toon Disney
- Release: September 2, 2002 – February 27, 2004

Lloyd in Space is an American animated television series, created by Recess co-creators Joe Ansolabehere and Paul Germain. It premiered on February 3, 2001, on ABC on Saturday mornings. The pilot was written by Ansolabehere, Germain and Mark Drop, with the characters designed by Eric Keyes. The series ran for three seasons, airing its final episode on February 27, 2004.

== Premise ==
The series follows Lloyd Nebulon, a green-skinned alien of the Verdigrean race, living in outer space. Lloyd lives in the Intrepidville Space Station along with his telekinetic and telepathic little sister Francine and his mother, Commander Norah Li Nebulon, the Head of Intrepidville. Lloyd's friends are Eddie R. Horton (a red-haired teenage human), Kurt Blobberts (a massive purple blob with a single eyeball and low intelligence, of a species known as the Blobullons), and Douglas McNoggin (a giant brain with limbs and a face, of a species known as the Cerebellians).

== Characters ==
=== Main ===
- Lloyd P. Nebulon (voiced by Courtland Mead) is a 13-year-old Verdigrean. Though he is usually a kind and easygoing teenager, despite his mother's leadership over Intrepidville, he and his group are pegged as "dorks" at Luna Vista Middle School. Such instances involve or result in constant disrespect and occasional bullying at the hands of their classmates, especially ones of the more socially-popular circle. Lloyd has a crush on his classmate Brittany Boviak, a cheerleader who secretly reciprocates his feelings despite bullying him.
- Commander Nora Li Nebulon (voiced by April Winchell) is the commander of Intrepidville and Lloyd and Francine's single mother. She is authoritarian, but patient, caring and supportive.
- Francine Nebulon (voiced by Nicolette Little) is Lloyd's younger sister. She loves her doll Rosie and using her telekinesis and telepathy. Her favorite TV show is The Daisy Droid Girls (a parody of The Powerpuff Girls).
- Station (voiced by Brian George) is the space station's computer. When activated, he assumes the form of an eyeball attached to a long wire leading from a computer terminal. Station has a tendency to be neurotic and dismissive to those around him.
- Edward R. "Eddie" Horton (voiced by Justin Shenkarow) is Lloyd's human best friend. He has wavy orange hair and tries to act in a "cool" manner. His father is a police officer.
- Douglas McNoggin (voiced by Pamela Hayden) is a Cerebellian who resembles a brain with limbs.
- Kurt Blobberts (voiced by Bill Fagerbakke) is Lloyd's large, one-eyed friend of the Blobullon species. While sometimes slow-witted, Kurt is a kind and loving character, but is usually treated the same as the rest of his group of friends. His head can be easily removed from his body and still function well.

=== Villains ===
- The Zeptar's Bandit (voiced by Danny Cooksey) is a lowly criminal.
- Frontok (voiced by Kevin Michael Richardson) is the captain of a fleet of space pirates.
- The Pick-pocket is a criminal that appears in Eddie's memory in the final episode of the show. He is caught by Eddie's dad.
- Kurtlas is the fusion between Douglas and Kurt due to Lloyd's suggestion. At first, Kurtlas defends the weaker and smaller kids at school from Rodney and the other bullies, but his fame goes to his head and becomes the school bully himself. He is stopped by Lloyd in the end.
- The Preditalien is a monster which attacks and infects Intrepidville from the year X27 to X37. If one scratched or bit another life form they too would become monsters.

=== Supporting ===
- Dunkirque (voiced by Dan Castellaneta) is second-in-command of the space station. He is a tough and obedient prominent aide to Commander Nebulon.
- Larry (voiced by Eddie Deezen) is one of Commander Nebulon's prominent aides. He is a purple humanoid who frequently acts very childishly.
- Boomer (voiced by Diedrich Bader) is the mechanic who repairs all the spacecraft on Intrepidville. He is fairly simple-minded. It is revealed in "Boomer's Secret Life" that he is the heir to his race's throne, but he turned his title over to his brother Sleeveknot.
- Lou 2000 (voiced by John DiMaggio) is Station's bad-mouthed backup system. When in use, he frequently picks on Larry a lot.
- Brittany Boviak (voiced by Anndi McAfee) is a wealthy, popular six-armed Tsktskian girl who is the captain of the cheerleading squad. She is also revealed later in the series to have a secret crush on Lloyd. Although she secretly likes Lloyd, she verbally and emotionally abuses him a lot, giving the impression that he is not worthy of her time.
- Megan Uno (voiced by Rachel Crane) is Brittany's best friend with a single eyestalk. She is usually with Brittany wherever she goes, and most of the time she is slightly more sour than Brittany herself and surprisingly more shallow in terms of boys.
- Cindy (voiced by Tara Strong (right) and Mayim Bialik (left) respectively) is a girl with two heads: one head is friendly, empathetic, and mature, and the other head tends to be rude, offensive, and grouchy. Cindy is one of the few recurring students to be a friend to Lloyd's group.
- Eileen (voiced by Michelle Horn) is a girl who has three eyes and tentacles in place of arms and legs.
- Rodney Glaxer (voiced by Warren Sroka) is a four-armed school bully who is also the quarterback of the Luna Vista crushball team. He favors picking on nerds, particularly Mendel, though he is still often enough antagonistic to anyone of lesser popularity such as Lloyd and his friend group.
- Mendel (voiced by Blake McIver Ewing) is one of the nerds at Luna Vista and the main target of Rodney's bullying. He often hangs out with his nerd friends such as Lou and Benny, as well as other unpopular kids.
- Mrs. Barbara Bolt (voiced by Tress MacNeille) is Lloyd's teacher at Luna Vista Middle School. She is a cranky robot who gets very angry when Lloyd or any other student is messing around in class.
- Mr. Stinko (voiced by Kevin Michael Richardson) is the garbage man of Intrepidville.
- Charmaine is a female Cerebellian. She is seen as a very intelligent character, and often is involved in debates against other schools, often with partner Douglas. She is friends with Douglas, Cindy and Missy.
- Missy is a Blobullon who resembles Kurt in many ways, she has one eye and purple skin. However, she is slightly smaller than Kurt. She and Kurt seem to like each other as shown in "Double Date", he compliments her saying she is "neat". She is friends with Cindy, Charmaine and Kurt.
- Leo Andromedos (voiced by Brian Doyle-Murray) is the grandfather of Lloyd and Francine and the father of Nora. He is a father figure to Lloyd.
- Jake is one of Rodney's friends. Jake, like Rodney, is also a bully and one of the Crater Worm jocks on the school's crushball team.
- Marcus Xenon is another one of Rodney's friends who is also a bully. Marcus, like Eileen, is a green, three-eyed, octopus-like alien, only without hair and having a more frequent tendency to moving bipedal.
- Violet (voiced by Ashley Johnson) is a girl who is friends with Brittany and Megan. Violet tends to be much more shy than the other girls of her class and she even reveals in "The Big Sleepover" that she has a crush on Lloyd, though this was never mentioned again afterwards. According to this same episode, she is president of the school yearbook staff.

== Episodes ==
=== Series overview ===
Season	Episodes		Originally released		
Season	Episodes		First released	Last released	Network
1	13		February 3, 2001	September 29, 2001	ABC
2	8	7	October 6, 2001	February 16, 2002	ABC
2	8	1	October 24, 2002		Disney Channel
3	18	1	February 9, 2002		ABC
3	18	8	October 1, 2002	October 10, 2002	Disney Channel
3	18	9	September 5, 2003	February 27, 2004	Toon Disney

=== Season 1 (2001) ===
Note: All episodes in this season aired on ABC.

No. overall	No. in season	Title	Written by	Storyboard by	Original release date	Prod. code
1	1	"The Big 1–3"	Joe Ansolabehere; Paul Germain and Mark Drop	Stark Howell; David Knott and Brad Vandergrift	February 3, 2001	LIS-001
This is it: Lloyd P. Nebulon is finally 13. He is a man. However, while bragging about it in class, Mrs Bolt assigns him a 50 Megabyte essay on what it means to be a man for the next day. Lloyd tries poker, but loses his lunch money to a bluffing robot toaster. Then he tries fishing but accidentally blows up a power plant. Then Officer Horton lets him take the wheel of the police car, but Lloyd accidentally totals both it and a waste-disposal unit (that was in the shop for 2 weeks) when he goes into hyperdrive (after mistaken a button for a radio button). Because of that, Lloyd is grounded for a month and is ordered to stay in his room while his mother goes out across Galaxy to negotiate with the owners of the power plant. However, he reluctantly disregards his mother's orders to leave when he finds out Francine is destroying the Preschool. Lloyd eventually gets there and stops Francine before it's too late, using all the tips he had gained. Then, he finally realised what it meant to be a man and finally got to work on the paper.
2	2	"The Science Project"	Bart Jennett	Stark Howell; David Knott and Brad Vandergrift	February 17, 2001	LIS-002
Lloyd really wants a pet, but at the same time has a science project he needs to complete. Douglas suggests that Lloyd should make a mould, the simplest project. Lloyd is happy about it at first, deciding to call it his own pet 'Mouldy', but then Lloyd's science project goes bad when he feeds it too much junk food and it goes on a food rampage.
3	3	"Double Date"	Mark Drop and Bernadette Luckett	Stark Howell; David Knott and Brad Vandergrift	February 10, 2001	LIS-003
The school dance is here and everybody's excited except Lloyd, who doesn't have a date. Whilst playing ball with Eddie, Lloyd comes across a girl named Cindy, and falls for her completely. Shortly afterwards, Lloyd sees Cindy at school and realizes she has two heads, one being friendly, empathetic and mature, the other rude, offensive and grouchy. Will Lloyd be able to take Cindy to the dance, or will he back out of it?
4	4	"Nerd from Beyond the Stars"	Story by : Mark Drop; Teleplay by : Gil Evans	Stark Howell; David Knott and Brad Vandergrift	May 26, 2001	LIS-004
A nerdy new kid named Larvel joins the class, whom everybody immediately ostracizes. Lloyd is forced to help him out, and soon he finds he's a pretty cool guy; but soon he becomes a more physically-developed teenager and starts to hang out with Brittany and the popular kids, eventually ditching Lloyd and his friends.
5	5	"Daydream Transceiver"	Jack Monaco	Francisco Barrios; Craig Kemplin and Roy Meurin	March 24, 2001	LIS-005
While Lloyd goes through puberty, his innermost fantasies come to life out of his antenna and create embarrassing moments for Lloyd, earning him his new freak name "Fantasy Boy".
6	6	"Caution: Wormhole!"	Bart Jennett and Sandy Frank	Francisco Barrios and Craig Kemplin	February 24, 2001	LIS-006
Lloyd feels unappreciated by his family and friends, so on the school trip Lloyd and Eddie fall into the worm hole, which takes them to the dumpster 30 feet away. But everyone else thinks they are somewhere else, far, far away, in the universe so Lloyd and Eddie decide this is their big chance and use it to get whatever they want.
7	7	"The Hero of Urbit-Knarr"	Mark Drop; Eric Garcia; Bart Jennett and Jack Monaco	Stark Howell; David Knott and Brad Vandergrift	March 3, 2001	LIS-007
Lloyd and his pals sneak aboard the spaceship of Brock Rockman, a visiting hero, and accidentally get lost in space and find themselves in even bigger problem with an alien fleet of space pirates.
8	8	"Campout on Zoltan III"	Bart Jennett	Stark Howell; David Knott and Brad Vandergrift	March 31, 2001	LIS-008
After watching a cool movie about surviving in the wilderness, Lloyd and the others ask their dads (Lloyd asks his grandfather due to his dad not being around) to take them to Zoltan III, but accidentally end up on Fangor Dar, the planet of danger.
9	9	"Kurtlas, the Symbiotic Boy!"	Mark Drop	Francisco Barrios; Craig Kemplin and Roy Meurin	April 7, 2001	LIS-009
When school bully, Rodney Glaxer, picks on Douglas and Kurt and challenges the former to an after-school fight, Lloyd suggests Kurt and Douglas work together as a symbiotic boy called Kurtlas, who rids the school of bullies, but with all the fame going to their heads, has Lloyd really found salvation or replaced one school bully with another?
10	10	"Babysitter Lloyd"	Joe Ansolabehere	Stark Howell; David Knott and Brad Vandergrift	April 21, 2001	LIS-010
Since Francine's babysitter broke her tentacle and Commander Nebulon is leaving the house for the weekend, Lloyd is forced to take care of Francine for the weekend, but it turns into a disaster since Francine is breaking stuff and will blame Lloyd for the stuff she has broken. Lloyd then takes Rosie (Francine's favorite toy doll) and straps onto a rocket ship in order to force Francine to behave. Francine later overhears Lloyd talking to his friends saying he wished he hadn't had a little sister so, causing her to leave the house for good, so Lloyd searches everywhere for her before it's too late.
11	11	"Android Lloyd"	Eric Garcia and Bart Jennett	Francisco Barrios; Craig Kemplin and Roy Meurin	May 19, 2001	LIS-011
Lloyd is sick and tired of the responsibilities of school and at home and he sees that he can make an android replica of himself. So he builds it and everybody seems to like the replica of Lloyd even though they don't know that it's a replica of Lloyd until the real Lloyd comes and confesses.
12	12	"Girl from the Center of the Universe"	Bart Jennett	Francisco Barrios; Craig Kemplin and Roy Meurin	September 22, 2001	LIS-013
When this new girl appears in school she makes the boys fall in love with her but they soon realize it is just a trick and only Lloyd is not affected by it, until he confronts her and soon he's affected. It's now up to Cindy to stop her and save the boys from being hypnotized.
13	13	"Pet Wars"	Story by : Mark Drop; Bart Jennett and Eric Garcia; Teleplay by : Charlie Tercek	Stark Howell; David Knott; Brad Vandergrift and Francisco Barrios	September 29, 2001	LIS-014
The boys have no money, so Lloyd comes up with an idea by starting to do a pet care business. Then Eddie can't take being bossed about anymore and he starts his own pet business which leaves them fighting against each other and soon the pets are all released.

=== Season 2 (2001–02) ===
Note: All episodes in this season aired on ABC, unless noted.

No. overall	No. in season	Title	Written by	Storyboard by	Original release date	Prod. code
14	1	"Nora's Big Date"	Story by : Bart Jennett; Eric Garcia and Mark Drop; Teleplay by : Joe Ansolabehere and Eric Garcia	Francisco Barrios; Craig Kemplin and Roy Meurin	October 6, 2001	LIS-101
Commander Nebulon starts falling in love with the ship mechanic and Lloyd begins to worry about her acting like this he figures out that the guy happens to be a monster like Lloyd thought he was but still then Nora loves him anyway.
15	2	"Boomer's Secret Life"	Joe Ansolabehere; Eric Garcia; Bart Jennett; Cate Lieuwen and Richard Whitley	Wendy Grieb; Stark Howell; David Knott and Brad Vandergrift	November 10, 2001	LIS-102
Lloyd and his friends try to hide Boomer who is being hunted by Secret Service agents, only to find out that Boomer is not a fugitive but a prince and his father (The King of his home planet) wants his son to come home and to take the throne.
16	3	"Lloyd Changes His Mind"	Story by : Mark Drop; Bart Jennett and Cate Lieuwen; Teleplay by : Elijah Aron	Craig Kemplin; Roy Meurin; Kevin Pawlak and Shane Zalvin	November 3, 2001	LIS-103
Lloyd is so sick and tired of Francine always reading his mind that Douglas gives him his mind scrambler which can block Francine from reading his mind. But when Francine tried to read his mind by breaking through the mind scrambler he's wearing, she tries so hard that they both end up swapping bodies and minds. Lloyd likes being in Francine's mind and body while attending her preschool, whilst Francine comes to hate being inside Lloyd's mind and body whilst attending his middle school. Will Lloyd in Francine's body of course save Francine before she gets scared of the dark at Darkon 5 and starts bawling?
17	4	"Lloyd's Lost Weekend"	Story by : Mark Drop; Bart Jennett and Richard Whitley; Teleplay by : Cate Lieuwen	Stark Howell; David Knott and Brad Vandergrift	January 19, 2002	LIS-104
Commander Nebulon and Francine are going to Zizmo Beach which Lloyd thinks is babyish and even worse they are going to McZorks' (their version of McDonald's) afterwards which Lloyd declines to spend a weekend with the McNoggins but they are too boring then he spends a weekend with the Blobberts but they are too babyish he then goes to Eddie's family but they are too boring as well he starts to miss his family and he'd do anything to see them again even if it means going to Zizmo Beach.
18	5	"The Big Sleepover"	Cate Lieuwen	Stark Howell; David Knott and Brad Vandergrift	February 16, 2002	LIS-105
Lloyd and friends discover that many of the girls have been getting invitations for a girl's only party at Brittany’s house so Lloyd disguises himself as a girl in order to infiltrate the slumber party.
19	6	"Neither Boy Nor Girl"	Eric Garcia and Richard Whitley	Sandy Frame; Wendy Grieb and Craig Kemplin	October 24, 2002 (Note: This episode first aired on Toon Disney between September 2-16, 2002; the listed date reflects its Disney Channel premiere.)	LIS-106
The new kid, Zoit, has an upcoming 13th birthday and will then choose to be either a boy or a girl. The boys (Lloyd and his friends) and girls (Brittany, Megan and Cindy) fight to convince Zoit on which gender is better. Note: This episode was not aired on ABC as part of Season 2, but instead on Disney Channel in 2002 alongside Season 3.
20	7	"Francine's Power Trip"	Nancylee Myatt	Stark Howell; David Knott and Brad Vandergrift	November 17, 2001	LIS-107
Francine gets a head cold and will not able to read minds for a day. Lloyd uses to his advantage, only to feel sorry for her upon seeing how upset she is when her powers seem to fizzle out for good.
21	8	"Cheery Theerlap, Lloyd"	Mark Drop and Cate Lieuwen	Sandy Frame; Craig Kemplin and Kevin Pawlak	December 22, 2001	LIS-108
Lloyd tries to get out of singing holiday songs for Droimatz (their version of Christmas) to read his comic book by claiming he celebrates Theerlap, even though he knows nothing about it. When he finds out there's not much to it, he makes it bigger than it is, and ends up offending his grandpa, the only one who truly knows about Theerlap, by doing so.

=== Season 3 (2002–04) ===
No. overall	No. in season	Title	Written by	Storyboard by	Original release date	Prod. code
22	1	"You're Never Too Old"	Bart Jennett and Nancylee Myatt	Stark Howell; David Knott; Kevin Pawlak and Brad Vandergrift	February 9, 2002 (Note: This episode first aired on ABC.)	LIS-201
Lloyd visits his Grandpa Leo at the retirement planet for the weekend but he is bored until Leo starts to see a woman he has a crush on but he is afraid to even speak to her so Lloyd helps him try to get her attention by maybe doing a dance. Note: This episode first aired on ABC alongside Season 2. It is the final episode to be copyrighted 2001.
23	2	"Gimme Some Skin"	John Doolittle and Bart Jennett	Stark Howell and Craig Kemplin	October 1, 2002	LIS-202
Station's email pen pal is coming over at Lloyd's house so Station asks Douglas to give him a living body just to impress his pen pal and Douglas accepts. They teach him everything to do to act like a man but soon it causes trouble. Note: From this episode onwards, every episode has a copyright of 2002.
24	3	"Incident at Luna Vista"	Story by : Cate Lieuwen; Teleplay by : Bart Jennett	David Knott and Brad Vandergrift	October 2, 2002	LIS-203
During a squabble caused by their inability to get along with each other, Mrs. Bolts' class accidentally triggers a new school safety feature and jettison their classroom into space with themselves in it.
25	4	"Big Brother Kurt"	Cate Lieuwen	Stark Howell and Craig Kemplin	October 3, 2002	LIS-204
Lloyd asks Kurt to play with Francine and so he does but they become so attached to each other that they're now friends which leaves Lloyd jealous of them.
26	5	"The Thrilla at Intrepidvilla"	Story by : Elijah Aron; Mark Drop and Cate Lieuwen; Teleplay by : Eric Garcia	David Knott and Brad Vandergrift	October 4, 2002	LIS-205
Francine uses her powers to defeat a band of bullies, so Lloyd and the gang make some guys come over to have a challenge with Francine but for some reason Francine is too tired to use her mind powers. The episode title was derived from Thrilla in Manila.
27	6	"That's Debatable"	Elijah Aron	Stark Howell and Craig Kemplin	October 7, 2002	LIS-206
Douglas' partner is not well so he wants Lloyd to be his partner so when Douglas studies extra hard and stuff he becomes sick so Lloyd must win the championship.
28	7	"Stink-O-Rama"	Joe Molinari	Wendy Grieb; David Knott and Brad Vandergrift	October 8, 2002	LIS-207
Lloyd and Eddie are forced to spend their school’s Career Day working for Mr. Stinko the garbageman. They soon start to like it and they must save a giant ball of garbage from coming into Intrepidville.
29	8	"Space Farm"	Bart Jennett and Krista Tucker	Stark Howell and Craig Kemplin	October 9, 2002	LIS-208
The gang have to do their own chores and get sick and tired of it so Douglas has an idea of introducing them to his Cousin Jubb which happens to live on a farm-like world. They start to hate it as first but soon they start to like the chores that they have to do in Cousin Jubb's home.
30	9	"Love Beam #9"	Cate Lieuwen	David Knott and Brad Vandergrift	October 10, 2002	LIS-209
Lloyd uses Douglas' latest invention which is The Love Beam and accidentally makes Brittany fall in love with him. He seems to like it at first but then he misses the old Brittany and tries a way to figure out how he can change her back until he realizes that the love beam didn't change her, it only allowed her to admit that she had always loved Lloyd, which she proves by showing him the message she carved on the same tree as Lloyd when they were 5-years-old, which says "Lloyd luvs Brittany...and Brittany luvs Lloyd too". Though warmed by this, Lloyd eventually still decides to return her back to normal, preferring that she wait to reveal her true feelings for Lloyd when she is ready to.
31	10	"At Home with the Bolts"	Amy Debartolomeis and David Warick	David Knott; Kevin Pawlak and Brad Vandergrift	September 5, 2003 (Note: This episode first aired on Toon Disney.)	LIS-210
Mrs. Bolt arranges a party for the class at her house, but nobody apart from Lloyd shows up. After being talked into staying by Mr. Bolt, he finds a video of what Mrs. Bolt used to be like, rather than the way she is today, prompting him to help her see how she can still make an impact on kids’ lives.
32	11	"A Place for Larry"	Elijah Aron	Stark Howell and Craig Kemplin	September 12, 2003	LIS-211
Larry is fired from working on the bridge and tries to look for another job with the help of Lloyd and his friends. Meanwhile, things become increasingly wrong in the station and only Larry can save Intrepidville from a meltdown.
33	12	"The Big Feud"	Eric Garcia	Wendy Grieb; Stark Howell and Craig Kemplin	September 19, 2003	LIS-212
Vice-Principal Feely wants everyone to find out about their race for a festival and Kurt and Douglas start to dislike each other due to the fact that both of their species have hated each other for generations.
34	13	"Halloween Scary Fun Action Plan"	Elijah Aron	Stark Howell and Craig Kemplin	October 12, 2003	LIS-213
Lloyd and the gang have a plan to scare Francine and her friends on Halloween, topping it off with Boomer's haunted house. But when Lloyd and the gang themselves go into the haunted house they are sent into the future, where all of Lloyd's friends turn into monsters, and he's left hiding on the station for the next fifty years. After admitting he misses Francine, and that he shouldn't have scared her, it turns out that it was a telepathic prank by Francine, with help from her friends and Boomer.
35	14	"Commander Lloyd"	Story by : Jim Peronto; Teleplay by : Cate Lieuwen	Wendy Grieb, David Knott, Kevin Pawlak and Brad Vandergrift	September 26, 2003	LIS-214
Lloyd becomes commander after a gas freezes every adult in Intrepidville. Soon, everything gets chaotic when Lloyd enables the kids in town to do whatever they want until the adults unfreeze and the station is disconnected, forcing Lloyd to have to save all the kids in Intrepidville.
36	15	"Heads Up, Blobberts!"	Story by : Cate Lieuwen; Teleplay by : Elijah Aron	David Knott and Brad Vandergrift	February 6, 2004	LIS-215
Kurt tries out for the Crater Worm crushball team (their version of football), where everyone finds out that he can remove his head and still operate his body. His body makes the team without the head and becomes a lot more popular, eventually rejecting Kurt. Around the same time though, Kurt's body becomes mean and unhibited and eventually gets too rough out on the field (even against his own team), and everyone has had enough, making Kurt's head and body reconcile.
37	16	"Day One"	Elijah Aron	Wendy Grieb and Kevin Pawlak	February 13, 2004	LIS-216
Eddie reminds Lloyd about an incident from 1st grade that led to him becoming unpopular during his future school years. When Douglas gives him a traveling time communicating watch which can take him to any time he wants, Lloyd then goes back to the day he first went to school in Intrepidville to stop his younger self from tripping over Rodney's foot and ruining Brittany's picture and he becomes popular in the present. However, Lloyd also realizes that him becoming popular meant that he never made friends with Eddie, Douglas and Kurt, whom he feels sorry for upon finding out how poorly they've turned out without befriending him (with Eddie being a scared little dweeb when given some noogies, Douglas being a tough customer and Kurt being the school horse), prompting him to go back in time and restore the balance of time and his former unpopular life.
38	17	"Go Crater Worms"	Eric Garcia	David Knott and Brad Vandergrift	February 20, 2004	LIS-217
The class clown and school mascot, Zoopy, is leaving Luna Vista Middle School and holds an audition for a student good enough to take his place. Lloyd and Eddie are told by Zoopy that they both made the cut. Little do they know, the whole thing was a setup plotted by Zoopy and Genevieve.
39	18	"The Ride Along"	Cate Lieuwen	Stark Howell and Craig Kemplin	February 27, 2004	LIS-218
In the series finale, Lloyd and Eddie spend an evening on a ride along with Eddie’s policeman father, only to find that the job is not what they expected.

== Production ==
Lloyd in Space was first introduced in early 2001 during Disney's One Saturday Morning on ABC. The show received higher ratings than initially expected, prompting Disney to quickly order additional episodes (some of which would air in the second season).

Lloyd in Space finished production in 2002, after the Disney's One Saturday Morning block was removed. The final episodes aired in February 2004.

== Reception ==
The series received a mixed reception. Andrea Graham of Common Sense Media described the series as focusing on "space teen [who] copes with intergalactic boredom". She also argued that the series is "charming and heartwarming".
