= W. Russell Neuman =

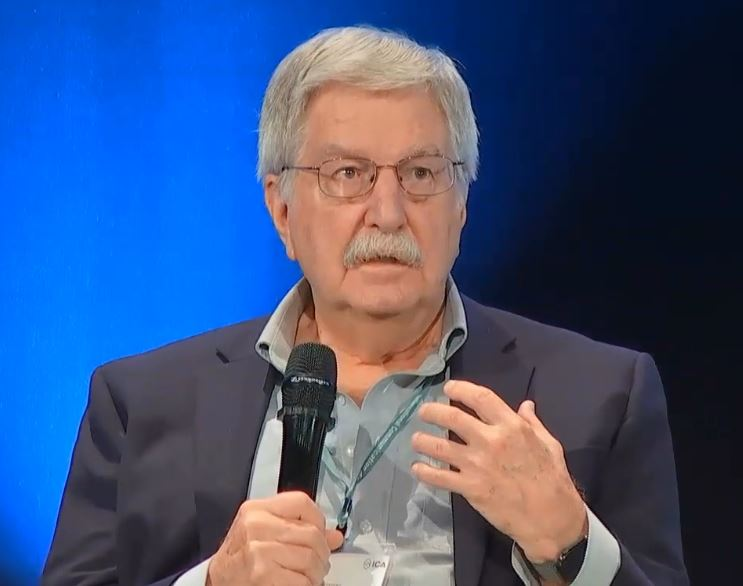
W. Russell Neuman, Paris, International Communications Association, 2022.

W. Russell Neuman is Professor of Media Technology, NYU Steinhardt School of Culture, Education, and Human Development and Professor (Emeritus), Communication Studies, University of Michigan. From 2001 to 2013, Dr. Neuman was the John Derby Evans Professor of Media Technology at the University of Michigan. Neuman received a Ph.D. And M.A. At the University of California, Berkeley Department of Sociology as well as a B.A. from Cornell University's Department of Government. He has an extensive teaching and research career at Yale University, Harvard University, University of Pennsylvania, and the University of Michigan. He is one of the founding faculty members at MIT Media Lab and with Ithiel de Sola Pool, MIT's Research Program on Communication Policy. From 2001-2003 he served as a Senior Policy Analyst in the White House Office of Science and Technology Policy working in the areas of information technology, broadband policy as well as biometrics and international security.

Neuman has published numerous articles on the topic of Telecommunications, Digital Media and politics, exploring the connections and effects they have on one another. Among his publications is an early review about the internet, "Social implications of the internet." He is also a whisky connoisseur with a respectable collection of rare whiskies.

Neuman is an editorial board member for the journals Political Communication and the Journal of Communication.

== Professional career ==
Neuman began his academic career as Assistant Professor of Sociology at Yale University’s Sociology Department and Institution for Social and Policy Studies. His research focused on the cultural and political impact of broadcast television. His Public Opinion Quarterly article "Patterns of Recall among Television News Viewers" funded by the National Association of Broadcasters assessed what viewers could recall from watching the evening network news. On average viewers could recall only about one of the typically 20 stories per newscast. He conducted a series of parallel studies on the impact of entertainment TV and evolving changes in cable and satellite television for the Corporation for Public Broadcasting and the Markle Foundation.

In 1980 Neuman joined the faculty of MIT as an Assistant Professor working with Ithiel de Sola Pool’s Research Program on Communication Policy and the MIT Media Lab. He published The Paradox of Mass Politics from his doctoral dissertation which focuses on electoral dynamics given typically low levels of political knowledge among American voters with Harvard University Press in 1986. The book develops a model of three publics, which more accurately portrays the distribution of political knowledge and behavior in the mass population. Neuman identifies a stratum of apoliticals, a large middle mass, and a politically sophisticated elite. The elite is so small (less than 5 percent) that the beliefs and behavior of its member are lost in the large random samples of national election surveys, but so active and articulate that its views are often equated with public opinion at large by the powers in Washington. The key to the paradox of mass politics is the activity of this tiny stratum of persons who follow political issues with care and expertise.

At MIT he organized a series of studies of audience dynamics and changing technologies with an industry consortium of NBC, CBS, ABC, Time Inc., Warner Media, the Washington Post and The New York Times which resulted in The Future of the Mass Audience published by Cambridge University Press in 1991. At the Media Lab Neuman conducted a series of studies of audience perceptions of test versions of the then evolving standard for high definition television. Audiences were lukewarm about the early high-cost, small-screen versions but proved enthusiastic in response to the later large-screen flat-panel displays which quickly became the norm. In one surprising result, the research team found that increasing the audio quality of video display resulted in higher levels of audience interest and engagement and, curiously, higher perceived quality of the video display.

Continuing the research on media effects Neuman, with Marion Just and Ann Crigler, published Common Knowledge in 1992. The study, supported by the Spencer Foundation, systematically compared learning from print and broadcast news sources. The study analyzed coverage of 150 television and newspaper stories on five prominent issues: drugs, AIDS, South African apartheid, the Strategic Defense Initiative, and the stock market crash of October 1987. It tested audience responses of more than 1,600 people, and conducted in-depth interviews with a select sample.

With Lee McKnight and Richard Jay Solomon, Neuman's The Gordian Knot: Political Gridlock on the Information Highway (MIT Press, 1997; ISBN 9780262263917) reviewed the dramatic deregulation and reorganization of American telecommunications industry and won the 1997 McGannon Award for Social and Ethical Relevance in Communications Policy Research.

Beginning in January 1997, Neuman joined the Annenberg School for Communication at the University of Pennsylvania as Professor of Communication and Director of the Information and Society Program, Annenberg Public Policy Center. There, his research centered on early use of the World Wide Web in political campaigns and discourse.

Following Susan B. Neuman to Washington DC as she was appointed Assistant Secretary of Elementary and Secondary Education in 2001, Russell was appointed as a Senior Policy Analyst in the White House Office of Science and Technology Policy to work in his field of media technology and regulation.

As John Derby Evans Professor of Media Technology at the University of Michigan department of Communication Studies and Institute of Social Research from 2001-2013, Neuman initiated a series of studies of political communication and media technology with support from the National Science Foundation. With George Marcus and Michael MacKuen a series of survey experiments led to the development of Affective Intelligence Theory (AIT). AIT challenges the conventional rational choice model by which reasoning is dominant and emotions inhibit sound political judgment. In contrast AIT proposes that affect and conscious reasoning are complementary with special emphasis on the role of anxiety in promoting information-seeking behavior.

After a decade of research Neuman completed The Digital Difference (Harvard University Press; ISBN 9780674969834) in 2016. The book examines how the transition from the industrial-era media of one-way publishing and broadcasting to the two-way digital era of online search and social media has dramatically influenced the dynamics of public life. Neuman argues that technologies by their nature do not cause freedom nor do they limit it. Technologies are embedded in a complex set of cultural expectations and institutions as well as regulatory and legal principles. He concludes that the fear of the “communication effects” of “bad ideas” is the enemy of free speech.

As of June 2023, Neuman is at the Educational Communication and Technology Program of NYU’s Steinhardt School of Culture, Education, and Human Development where his research focus has shifted to the most recent of technological transitions — the evolution of artificial intelligence. His 2023 book Evolutionary Intelligence: How Technology Will Make Us Smarter (MIT Press, 2023; ISBN 9780262048484) explores the rarely acknowledged role of next generation artificial intelligence as augmenting human decision-making by compensating for gaps in human intelligence. Neuman argues that we should not design our emergent AI systems to replicate human thinking. Instead we should design them to it to think differently, to augment human thinking in fresh ways to compensate for the relatively well understood errors and distortions in typical human thinking and behavior, in what he characterizes as the next stage of human inventiveness.

== Publications ==
- The Paradox of Mass Politics: Knowledge and Opinion in the American Electorate. Harvard University Press, 1986.
- The Future of the Mass Audience. Cambridge University Press, 1991.
- Common Knowledge: News and the Construction of Political Meaning. (with Marion Just and Ann Crigler), University of Chicago Press,1992.
- The Gordian Knot: Political Gridlock on the Information Highway (with Lee McKnight and Richard Jay Solomon), MIT Press, 1997.
- Affective Intelligence and Political Judgment (with George Marcus and Michael MacKuen), University of Chicago Press, 2000
- The Digital Difference: Media Technology and the Theory of Communication Effects. Harvard University Press, 2016.
- "Television Sound and Viewer Perceptions" (with Ann N. Crigler, and V. Michael Bove) Proceedings of the Joint IEEE/Audio Engineering Society, Detroit Michigan, February, 1991
- "Patterns of Recall among Television News Viewers," Public Opinion Quarterly, Volume 40, Number 1, Spring, 1976.
- "The Mass Audience Looks at HDTV: An Early Experiment" National Association of Broadcasters Annual Conference, Las Vegas, April 1988.

== Awards and honors ==
- The Gordian Knot: Political Gridlock on the Information Superhighway, by Neuman, McKnight, and Solomon, received the 1997 Donald McGannon Award for Social and Ethical Relevance in Communications Policy Research.
- Neuman received the 1998 Alfred Freedman award from the International Society of Political Psychology for the best scientific paper presented at the ISPP annual meeting.
- In 2007 Neuman received the Murray Edelman Distinguished Career Award from the American Political Science Association.
- In 2018 he received the William F. Ogburn Career Achievement Award by the CITAMS (Communication, Information Technology & Media Sociology) Section at the annual meeting of the American Sociological Association.
