= Donald Kinder =

American political scientist

Donald R. Kinder
- Born: April 14, 1947 (age 78)
- Education: Stanford University; University of California, Los Angeles
- Awards: Guggenheim Fellowship (1990–91) (with Shanto Iyengar) 2004 Phillip E. Converse Book Award from the American Political Science Association
- Scientific career
- Fields: Political science
- Institutions: University of Michigan
- Thesis: Balance theory and political person perception: asymmetry in beliefs about political leaders (1975)
- Doctoral students: Adam Berinsky; Walter Mebane

Donald Ray Kinder (born April 14, 1947) is an American political scientist and the Philip E. Converse Professor in the Department of Political Science at the University of Michigan. He is also a professor by courtesy in the University of Michigan's Department of Psychology, and a research professor in the University of Michigan Institute for Social Research's Center for Political Studies. In 2017, he was elected to the National Academy of Sciences.

== Books ==
- (with Shanto Iyengar) News that Matters: Television and American Public Opinion (University of Chicago Press, 1987)
- (with Cindy Kam) Us Against Them: Ethnocentric Foundations of American Opinion (University of Chicago Press, 2010)
