= WHYY =

WHYY may refer to:

- WHYY-TV, a television station (channel 13, virtual 12) licensed to Wilmington, Delaware, United States
- WHYY-FM, a radio station (90.9 FM) licensed to Philadelphia, Pennsylvania, United States
