= James David Barber =

American political scientist (1930–2004)

- Born: July 31, 1930; Charleston, West Virginia, US
- Died: September 12, 2004 (aged 74); Durham, North Carolina, US
- Education: University of Chicago; Yale University (Ph.D.)
- Occupations: Author, political scientist
- Known for: Presidential Character: Predicting Performance In The White House
- Spouses: Ann Goodridge Sale (1930-2015); Amanda Mackay Smith (1972–2004)
- Children: 4

James David Barber (July 31, 1930 – September 12, 2004) was a political scientist whose book The Presidential Character made him famous for his classification of presidents through their worldviews. From 1977 to 1995, he taught political science at Duke University.

== Background ==
Barber was born on July 31, 1930, in Charleston, West Virginia, to a physician and a nurse. In the 1950s he served in the United States Army as a counter-intelligence agent before attending the University of Chicago, where he earned a master's degree in political science. He earned a Ph.D. in the same field from Yale University.

He joined the faculty at Duke University in 1972, and became a full professor there in 1977. Before going to Duke he had taught at Stetson University in DeLand, Florida.

Barber retired from teaching in 1995 and was active in St. Philip's Episcopal Church.

== Work ==
He is credited in the field of political science for being the first to examine presidents beyond case studies. He devised a system of organizing a president's character into either active-positive, passive-positive, active-negative, or passive-negative this system is laid out in his book Presidential Character: Predicting Performance In The White House.

- Traits of an active-positive president include: a readiness to act, high optimism, and an overall fondness of the presidency. Some examples of presidents Barber cites as active-positive include Franklin D. Roosevelt, Harry S. Truman, John F. Kennedy, Jimmy Carter, and Gerald Ford.
- Traits of a passive-positive president include: a low self-esteem compensated by an ingratiating personality, superficially optimistic, and a desire to please. Examples of passive-positive presidents include William Howard Taft, Ronald Reagan, and Warren G. Harding.
- Traits of an active-negative president include: lack of deriving joy after expending much effort on tasks, aggressive, highly rigid, and having a general view of power as a means to self-realization. Examples of active-negative presidents include Woodrow Wilson, Herbert Hoover, and Richard Nixon.
- Traits of a passive-negative president include: a strong sense of duty, desire to avoid power, low self-esteem compensated by service towards others, and an overall aversion to intense political negotiation. Presidential examples include Calvin Coolidge and Dwight D. Eisenhower.

== See also ==
- James A. Russell is credited with developing a similar system now termed core affect, published in 1980, as part of their PAD emotional state model
