= International Society of Political Psychology =

The International Society of Political Psychology (ISPP) is an interdisciplinary not-for-profit organization, representing all fields of enquiry involved with the exploration of relationships between both psychological and political processes and phenomena. Members include psychologists, political scientists, psychiatrists, historians, sociologists, economists, anthropologists, as well as journalists, government officials and others. The Society is international, with members from all regions of the world: the Americas, Europe, Asia, the Middle East, and Africa. The Central Office is located in Albany, NY, USA. Throughout its history, the ISPP has offered encouragement to those who actively engaged in a wide spectrum of disciplinary approaches to political psychology. Members receive the Society's journal, Political Psychology and also access to the annual Advances in Political Psychology; ISPPNews, the Society's newsletter; reduced registration fees at ISPP's Annual Scientific Meeting; occasional discounts on non-ISPP publications; and voting privileges. ISPP has the following stated aims:

- To establish a community which has an interest in examining the relationship between political and psychological phenomena;
- To facilitate communication across boundaries;
- To increase the significance of political psychology;
- To provide support amongst members in order to generate and disseminate their findings and ideas.

In January 1978, the International Society of Political Psychology was founded by Jeanne N. Knutson of the Department of Psychiatry and Biobehavioral Sciences, University of California, Los Angeles. Since that time, the Society has grown to over 1,000 members who share this area of scholarly interest.

== Annual meeting ==
Each meeting since the first one in New York City in September 1978 has involved a four-day program of workshops, panel discussions, invited addresses, and special events. Society meetings generally offer over 100 panels, round tables, and workshops, with over 300 presentations. In 2011, ISPP also initiated its Summer Academy during three days preceding the annual meeting. The Summer Academy aims to train interested faculty and students in both foundational and cutting-edge research in the area of political psychology. The locations of the Summer Academy and annual meetings rotate between North America, Europe and other locations around the globe.

== Journal ==
The Society publishes its own journal, Political Psychology. The journal of the International Society of Political Psychology is dedicated to the analysis of the interrelationships between psychological and political processes. International contributors draw on a diverse range of sources, including cognitive psychology, political science, economics, history, international relations, philosophy, political theory, sociology, and social and clinical psychology.

== Advances in Political Psychology ==
The second publication of the International Society of Political Psychology, Advances in Political Psychology is published once each year.

== Presidents ==
The presidents of the International Society of Political Psychology have been:

- Robert E. Lane (1978–1979)
- Seymour Martin Lipset (1979–1980)
- Philip Converse (1980–1981)
- Morton Deutsch (1981–1982)
- James MacGregor Burns (1982–1983)
- Vamik D. Volkan (1983–1984)
- Stanley Hoffman (1984–1985)
- Herbert C. Kelman (1985–1986)
- Hans-Dieter Klingemann (1986–1987)
- Margaret G. Hermann (1987–1988)
- Ralph K. White (1988–1989)
- M. Kent Jennings (1989–1990)
- Roberta Sigel (1990–1991)
- John E. Mack (1991–1992)
- Tom Bryder (1992–1993)
- Betty Glad (1993–1994)
- David O. Sears (1994–1995)
- Doris Graber (1995–1996)
- Fred Greenstein (1996–1997)
- Martha Crenshaw (1997–1998)
- David G. Winter (1998–1999)
- Daniel Bar-Tal (1999–2000)
- Ervin Staub (2000–2001)
- Helen Haste (2001–2002)
- Stanley Renshon (2002–2003)
- Richard Ned Lebow (2003–2004)
- Janusz Reykowski (2004–2005)
- Maritza Montero (2005–2006)
- George Marcus (2006–2007)
- Kristen Monroe (2007–2008)
- Cheryl Koopman (2008–2009)
- Sam McFarland (2009–2010)
- Leonie Huddy (2010–2011)
- Bert Klandermans (2011–2012)
- Rose McDermott (2012–2013)
- Stanley Feldman (2013–2014)
- Paul Nesbitt-Larking (2014–2015)
- John Jost (2015–2016)
- Katherine J. Reynolds (2016–2017)
- Eva G. T. Green (2017–2018)
- David Redlawsk (2018–2019)
- Nicholas Valentino (2019–2020)
- Felicia Pratto (2020–2021)
- Tereza Capelos (2021–2022)
- Roberto Gonzalez (2022–2023)
- Catarina Kinnvall (2023–2024)
- Christopher Federico (2024–2025)
- Joanne Miller (2025-2026)
