= Cheryl Koopman =

American social psychologist (1950–2019)

- Born: June 14, 1950; Red Bluff, California
- Died: May 14, 2019 (aged 68); South Lake Tahoe, California
- Education: University of California, Berkeley; University of California, Los Angeles; University of Virginia
- Scientific career
- Fields: Social psychology; Behavioural sciences; International relations
- Workplaces: Columbia University; Harvard University; Stanford University

Cheryl Ann Koopman (June 14, 1950—May 14, 2019) was an American social psychologist, behavioral scientist, and international relations scholar. As a professor of psychiatry and behavioral sciences at Stanford University and the Stanford University School of Medicine, Koopman was an expert on the social and political context of diseases and diagnosis, quality of life interventions among people living with cancer, and the psychology of problems in international relations like nuclear war prevention. She was the President of the International Society of Political Psychology.

== Life and career ==
Koopman was born on June 14, 1950, in Red Bluff, California. She attended the University of California, Berkeley, where she obtained a B.A. degree in psychology in 1972. In 1974 she graduated from the University of California, Los Angeles with an M.A. in educational psychology, and in 1979 she completed a PhD at the University of Virginia in educational psychology and program evaluation. She then worked as a Post-Doctoral Fellow at Columbia University's School of International and Public Affairs, as well as at Harvard University. After these post-doctoral positions, Koopman joined the faculty at Columbia University, and in 1992 she moved to Stanford University. At Stanford, Koopman was a Professor of Psychiatry and Behavioral Sciences, and was affiliated with the Stanford University School of Medicine and the Stanford Cancer Institute.

Early in Koopman's career, she worked on the psychology of how to prevent nuclear war. She spent much of her career studying the social and political context of human health, including studying how demographics affect the diagnosis and medical characteristics of Lyme disease, and working on interventions to support the well-being of women in rural areas who had been diagnosed with breast cancer. She also studied individuals' responses to stressful events, the psychology of natural disasters, and political violence.

Koopman retired from the Stanford University School of Medicine, becoming Professor Emerita of Psychiatry and Behavioral Sciences, in 2015.

Koopman was the 2008–09 president of the International Society of Political Psychology. She also co-founded the organization Massachusetts Psychologists for Social Responsibility.

Koopman died in 2019 in South Lake Tahoe, California. Koopman is the namesake for the annual best dissertation award of the Stanford PsyD Consortium, the Cheryl Koopman Dissertation of the Year Award.

== Selected works ==
- "Predictors of posttraumatic stress symptoms among survivors of the Oakland/Berkeley, Calif., firestorm", The American Journal of Psychiatry, coauthored (1994)
- "Coping styles associated with psychological adjustment to advanced breast cancer", Health Psychology, coauthored (1996)
- "Supportive-Expressive Group Therapy and Distress in Patients With Metastatic Breast Cancer: A Randomized Clinical Intervention Trial", JAMA Psychiatry, coauthored (2001)
- "Stanford Presenteeism Scale: Health Status and Employee Productivity", Journal of Occupational and Environmental Medicine, coauthored (2002)
- "Evaluation of an internet support group for women with primary breast cancer", Cancer, coauthored (2003)
