= Stephen Ansolabehere =

American political scientist and academic

- Born: Stephen Daniel Ansolabehere
- Education: University of Minnesota (BA, BS); Harvard University (PhD)
- Relatives: Joe Ansolabehere (brother)
- Awards: 1996 Goldsmith Book Prize with Shanto Iyengar
- Scientific career
- Fields: Political science
- Workplaces: Harvard University
- Thesis: The limits of PAC power: campaign fundraising and congressional policy-making (1989)

Stephen Daniel Ansolabehere (/ænˌsɒləbəˈhɛər/ an-SOL-ə-bə-HAIR) is an American political scientist and academic, who is Frank G. Thompson Professor of Government at Harvard University. He is the younger brother of animator Joe Ansolabehere.

== Education ==
Ansolabehere received his B.A. in political science and B.S. in economics from the University of Minnesota in 1984, and his Ph.D. in political science from Harvard in 1989.

== Career ==
From 1989 to 1993, Ansolabehere served as an assistant professor in the University of California, Los Angeles' department of political science. He became an associate professor of political science at Massachusetts Institute of Technology in 1995, and Elting R. Morison Professor of Political Science there in 1998. He held this position from 1998 until joining the faculty of Harvard in 2008.

== Work ==
Ansolabehere is known for his research on multiple aspects of elections in the United States, including public opinion, mass media, and representation. In 2003, he published a paper arguing that in the United States, people and corporations tend to consider donating money to be an inefficient way of influencing politicians. The same paper argued that most people who donate to a politician do so because they genuinely support the politician's cause, and because donating to support their preferred politician makes them feel good, and that campaign spending as a percentage of GDP may have actually declined in the previous 100 years.

== Honors and awards ==
In 1996, Ansolabehere received the Goldsmith Book Prize for the book Going Negative, which he co-authored with Shanto Iyengar.
