= Stanley Renshon =

Stanley Renshon is a professor of political science at the City University of New York Graduate Center, Lehman College (City University of New York) and is a psychoanalyst.

Renshon grew up in New Jersey, went to college at Rutgers University, and then obtained a master's degree in international relations at American University, as well as a PhD in political science at the University of Pennsylvania (1972). He entered a clinical psychology doctoral program at Long Island University, and received psychoanalytic training and certification at the Institute for Self Psychology (1991). His wife Judith is also a psychoanalyst. He has two children Jonathan with Judith and David from a previous marriage to Nancy Sue Hano

Renshon has published fifteen books and approximately ninety professional articles related to presidential politics, leadership and political psychology. His book about Bill Clinton, High Hopes: The Clinton Presidency and the Politics of Ambition, was awarded the Gradiva Award from the National Association for the Advancement of Psychoanalysis for the best published work in the category of biography in 1998 and the 1997 Richard E. Neustadt Award from the American Political Science Association for the best book published on the presidency.

== Books ==
- Barack Obama and the Politics of Redemption (Routledge, forthcoming 2011)
- National Security in the Obama Administration: Reassessing the Bush Doctrine (Routledge, 2009)
- The Bush Doctrine and the Future of American National Security Policy (Yale University Press 2008)
- Understanding the Bush Doctrine: Psychology and Strategy in an Age of Terrorism (Routledge Press 2007)
- The 50% American: National Identity in a Dangerous Age (2005)
- In his Father's Shadow: The Transformations of George W. Bush (Palgrave/Macmillan, 2004)
- Good Judgment in Foreign Policy: Theory and Research (Rowman and Littlefield 2002)
- America's Second Civil War: Political Leadership in a Divided Society (Transaction 2002)
- One America?: Political Leadership, National Identity, and the Dilemmas of Diversity (Georgetown University Press, 2001)
- Political Psychology: Cultural and Cross-cultural Foundations (Macmillan, 2000)
- High Hopes: The Clinton Presidency and the Politics of Ambition (New York University Press, 1996, updated paperback edition, 1998 Routledge Press)
- The Psychological Assessment of Presidential Candidates (New York University Press, 1996, updated paperback edition, 1998 Routledge Press)
- The Clinton Presidency: Campaigning, Governing and the Psychology of Leadership (Westview Press)
- The Political Psychology of the Gulf War (University of Pittsburgh Press)
- The Handbook of Political Socialization: Theory and Research (Free Press)
- Psychological Needs and Political Behavior (Free Press)
