= Joe Ansolabehere =

American television writer and producer (born 1959)

- Born: Joseph Michael Ansolabehere; 1959 (age 66–67)
- Education: University of Nevada, Reno; UCLA School of Theater, Film and Television
- Occupations: Television writer; television producer
- Years active: 1989–present
- Known for: Recess (1997–2001); Recess: School's Out (2001); Lloyd in Space (2001–2004)
- Relatives: Stephen Ansolabehere (brother)

Joseph Michael Ansolabehere (/ænˈsɒləbəhɛər/ an-SOL-ə-bə-hair; born 1959) is an American television writer and producer. With partner and friend Paul Germain, as the team Paul & Joe Productions, he is the co-creator of animated series Recess and Lloyd in Space. He also served as a story editor on the first 65 episodes of Rugrats, as well as a co-producer and story editor of the first season of Hey Arnold!

== Early life and education ==
Ansolabehere is the oldest of five brothers. His brother Stephen is a political scientist and Frank G. Thompson Professor of Government at Harvard. His brother Paul is a vice president of Anagram in Minneapolis, and his youngest brother, Louis, is a computer technician. As children they moved around often, living in Detroit, Champaign, Reno-Sparks, and Minneapolis.

Ansolabehere graduated from the University of Nevada, Reno, and then went to UCLA for film school, where he was introduced to animation.

== Career ==
In the early 1980s, Ansolabehere partnered with Steve Viksten to write screenplays. Together they wrote and sold several comedy screenplays, including Surfin CIA, Exterminators, Crooked Affair, and Sitting Ducks. None of their scripts were ever produced, and by the end of the 1980s, Ansolabehere found himself working for his friends at Rhythm and Hues as a producer of computer animation, mostly for commercials. While working at R&H, Ansolabehere was contacted by an old friend from UCLA, Paul Germain. Germain had recently co-created (with Arlene Klasky and Gabor Csupo) and sold the show Rugrats to Nickelodeon, and was looking for writers.

In 1990, Ansolabehere began working on Rugrats, first with Viksten, and then on his own. He eventually became one of the first head story editors on the show. During his tenure, the show won a slew of Emmys and became a massive hit for Nickelodeon.

It was here that he met Craig Bartlett (who had been the first story editor on the show). They became friends, and a few years later when Bartlett sold Hey Arnold! to Nickelodeon, he asked Ansolabehere to work on it with him. He co-wrote the pilot, and co-produced the first two seasons. The show has remained a cult hit for years, with a huge internet following of die-hard Arnold fans.

Ansolabehere then partnered with Paul Germain to create Recess for Disney. The Recess playground was based on Ansolabehere and Germain's own elementary school memories, and the characters were all based on friends they knew back then. The show became ABC's biggest Saturday morning hit of the late 1990s. It spawned a feature film, Recess: School's Out, which Ansolabehere and Germain wrote and produced in 2001.

With Germain, Ansolabehere also created and produced the animated series Lloyd in Space for Disney, and developed and produced the show Pound Puppies for The Hub, receiving the 2012 Humanitas Award for the episode "I Never Barked for My Father".

He worked for Disney Jr. from 2011 to 2017, writing for Sheriff Callie's Wild West and Miles from Tomorrowland, then story editing the first season of Goldie & Bear.

Other animated television shows Ansolabehere has written and produced for include Beethoven, Duckman, Dinosaur Train, Peter Rabbit, Henry Hugglemonster, Let's Go Luna! and Motown. He was credited as a screenwriter on Tinker Bell and the Great Fairy Rescue.
