= Maritza Montero =

Venezuelan psychologist

- Montero in 2012
- Born: Maritza Montero Rivas; 11 November 1939; Caracas, Venezuela
- Died: 23 July 2025 (aged 85); Madrid, Spain
- Education: Central University of Venezuela (Lic.); Simón Bolívar University (M.A.); University of Paris (PhD)
- Scientific career
- Fields: Social psychology; Community psychology; Political psychology
- Workplaces: Andrés Bello Catholic University; Central University of Venezuela

Maritza Montero Rivas (born 11 November 1939 – died 23 July 2025) was a Venezuelan social psychologist. She studied psychology in the Central University of Venezuela, followed by a master's degree in the discipline at Simón Bolívar University and a sociology PhD from the University of Paris.

She was a Professor and Program Director at the Central University of Venezuela and was a guest lecturer in over twenty-four countries. Her work focused on community psychology, political psychology, and liberation psychology, particularly in Latin America. She held various positions in academic organizations and was awarded various times, including the Interamerican Psychology Award in 1995 and the Venezuelan National Science Award in the area of social sciences in 2000.

Montero has been noted as an influential figure in her field field due to her theoretical contributions, her research into the history of social psychology and her long career as a professor.

== Life and career ==
Montero was born in Caracas, Venezuela. She attended the Central University of Venezuela and, after studying law due to family pressure, graduated with a degree in Psychology in 1967.

Her work as a researcher and professor started shortly after receiving her bachelor's degree, giving psychology classes to anthropology students in the Central University of Venezuela.

She received her Master's in psychology from Simón Bolívar University in 1979, followed by a PhD in sociology at the School for Advanced Studies in the Social Sciences of the University of Paris in 1982.

After obtaining her PhD, Montero worked at a series of universities. From 1999 to 2005, she directed a graduate program in community psychology at the Andrés Bello Catholic University. She then became a professor and program director at the Central University of Venezuela. Apart from her native Venezuela, she was a visiting professor in over twenty-four countries.

Montero held various prominent positions in many academic organizations. She was a founding member of the Venezuelan Association of Social Psychology and its President between 1978–1980 and 1983–1986. From 2005 to 2006, Montero was the president of the International Society of Political Psychology. She was involved in the creation of the Community Psychology Committee in the Interamerican Psychological Society after its 1979 symposium in Lima, being its general coordinator from 1995 to 1997, as well as presiding over its 1999 congress in Venezuela. She was the coordinator of the international committee of the 27th Division of the American Psychological Association in 2003.

Montero died on 23 July 2025 in Madrid.

== Work ==
Montero's work helped conceptualize the history of Latin American community psychology, often noting how it had been influenced by the work of Ignacio Martín-Baró, Paulo Freire and others who affected the course of Latin American social sciences. An article noting its similarities and differences with American developments often noted by retrospectives on her career.

One of Montero's contributions to the field was the insistence on focusing on the particularities of Latin America, rather than taking in contributions from the centers of power-knowledge such as the United States. This concern for producing situated knowledge has translated into other scholars making visible an episteme proper to Latin America, characterized as "seeing and doing from a plurality of modalities and voices — especially the oppressed — and a conception of relative, indeterminate, unfinished and historical knowledge". This criticism of the importing of Western thought also involved the relation between researcher-researched, the subject-object division and the focus on the individual in psychology.

In regards to the methods of work with community, Montero described and conceptualized community psychosocial processes as the basis for the betterment of their quality of life. These processes involve problematizating the status quo, with deideologization, dehabituation and de-alienation as part of this problematization.

== Legacy and recognition ==
Montero has been described as "one of the pioneers of Latin American social psychology", with her contributions considered essential to the development of community psychology in Latin America and the world. Montero has, as well, been regarded as a leading theorist in liberation psychology.

Montero received the 1995 Interamerican Psychology Award from the Interamerican Society of Psychology, which is given once every two years to two researchers "for outstanding contributions supporting the development of psychology as a science and a profession in the Americas". She won the Venezuelan National Science Award in the area of Social Sciences in 2000.

Since 2021, the Interamerican Society of Psychology gives out an award bearing her name, aimed towards academics in the early or medium stages of their careers.

== Selected works ==
- Psicología Política Latinoamericana [Latin American Political Psychology]. Coordinator. (1987). Editorial Panapo.
- Teoría y práctica de la psicología comunitaria [Theory and practice of community psychology]. (2003). Paidós.
- Introducción a la psicología comunitaria [Introduction to community psychology]. (2004). Paidós.
- Hacer para transformar: el método en la psicología comunitaria [Doing to transform: method in community psychology]. (2006). Paidós.
