= Stanley Feldman (political scientist) =

American professor of political science

Academic background
- Education: Stony Brook University; University of Minnesota

Academic work
- Discipline: Political science
- Sub-discipline: Political psychology
- Institutions: Stony Brook University
- Website: http://stanleyfeldman.site44.com/

Stanley Feldman is an American professor of political science who specializes in political psychology. He has been the president of the International Society of Political Psychology from 2013 to 2014. One of the central focuses of his work has been on right-wing authoritarianism. According to Google Scholar, he has been cited nearly 20,000 times by other academics. He is currently working at the Stony Brook University, as well as being a visiting academic at the University of Melbourne.
