= Elizabeth Theiss-Morse =

American political scientist

- Education: University of Minnesota
- Scientific career
- Fields: Political science
- Workplaces: University of Nebraska–Lincoln

Elizabeth Theiss-Morse is an American political scientist. She is the Willa Cather Professor of Political Science at the University of Nebraska–Lincoln, where she has also served as the Interim Dean of the College of Arts and Sciences. She studies political psychology, with a particular focus on group identity, the role of emotions in politics, and public opinion in the United States.

== Early work and education ==
Theiss-Morse earned her BA in 1982 at the University of Minnesota, where she studied history. She then continued to study at the University of Minnesota, earning a PhD in political science in 1989. In 1988, Theiss-Morse joined the faculty at the University of Nebraska–Lincoln.

== Career ==
In addition to publishing several dozen journal articles and chapters in edited volumes, Theiss-Morse has been an author or an editor of 9 books. She was the sole author of the 2009 book Who Counts as an American? The Boundaries of National Identity, which reports findings from an original national survey to study how flexible American national identity is. She studied both the level of attachment that individuals feel to American group identity, as well as how the boundaries of that identity are constructed, which includes understanding who is a prototypical member of that group and who is a marginalized member. Who Counts as an American was awarded the 2010 Robert E. Lane Award from the American Political Science Association, which recognizes the best book in political psychology published in the previous year.

Several of Theiss-Morse's other books have also won major awards. Her 1995 book Congress as Public Enemy: Public Attitudes toward American Political Institutions, coauthored with John Hibbing, was given the Richard F. Fenno Jr. Prize from the American Political Science Association, which is "awarded to the best book in legislative studies published in the previous year". Another book which Theiss-Morse coauthored in 1995, With Malice toward Some: How People Make Civil Liberties Judgments, received the Best Book in Political Psychology award from the American Political Science Association.

From 2008 until 2013 Theiss-Morse was chair of the political science department at the University of Nebraska–Lincoln, and in 2010 she was named the Willa Cather Professor of Political Science. On July 1, 2019, Theiss-Morse was named the Interim Dean of the College of Arts and Sciences at the University of Nebraska–Lincoln. In July 2020 she returned to her faculty role. Theiss-Morse's work has been extensively cited in media outlets including The Washington Post, The New York Times, The Atlantic, The BBC, and the Lincoln Journal Star.

== Selected works ==
- Congress as Public Enemy: Public Attitudes toward American Political Institutions, with John Hibbing (1995)
- With Malice toward Some: How People Make Civil Liberties Judgments, with George E. Marcus, John L. Sullivan, and Sandra Wood (1995)
- Who Counts as an American? The Boundaries of National Identity (2009)
- Respect and Loathing in American Democracy: Polarization, Moralization, and the Undermining of Equality, with Jeff Spinner-Halev (2024)

== Selected awards ==
- Best Book in Political Psychology, American Political Science Association (1996)
- Richard F. Fenno Jr. Prize, American Political Science Association (1996)
- Robert E. Lane Award, American Political Science Association (2010)
