= Shanto Iyengar =

American political scientist

- Born: India
- Education: Linfield College (B.A., 1968); University of Iowa (Ph.D., 1972)
- Known for: Work on political communication
- Awards: 1996 Goldsmith Book Prize (with Stephen Ansolabehere); 1998 Murray Edelman Distinguished Career Award from the American Political Science Association
- Scientific career
- Fields: Political science
- Institutions: Stanford University
- Thesis: The correlates and consequences of response stability: a methodological analysis (1972)

Shanto Iyengar is an American political scientist and professor of political science at Stanford University. He is also the Harry & Norman Chandler Professor of Communication at Stanford, the director of Stanford's Political Communication Lab, and a senior fellow at the Hoover Institution.

== Biography ==
Iyengar received an initial bachelor's degree in his native India and then received a bachelor's degree from Linfield College in 1968 and his Ph.D. from the University of Iowa in 1972. In 1973, he joined the faculty of Kansas State University as an assistant professor, where he remained until 1979. He taught at Yale University as an assistant professor from 1983 to 1985, and then taught at Stony Brook University and the University of California, Los Angeles before joining Stanford's faculty in 1998.

== Research ==
Iyengar is known for his work on the role of the news media in contemporary politics. This includes work he conducted with Dartmouth College political scientist Sean J. Westwood, in which they analyze partisan divisions in American politics. He has been an American National Elections Studies principal investigator since 2016.
