= American National Election Studies =

Surveys of voters in USA

- Official logo of ANES
- Abbreviation: ANES
- Formation: 1948; 78 years ago
- Headquarters: University of Michigan, Ann Arbor, MI; Stanford University, Stanford, CA
- Principal Investigators: Nicholas Valentino, Shanto Iyengar, Daron Shaw, Sunshine Hillygus
- Board of directors: James Druckman, Board chair
- Website: electionstudies.org

The American National Election Studies (ANES) are academically-run national surveys of voters in the United States, conducted before and after every presidential election. It does not have polling data or official voting returns. Although it was formally established by a National Science Foundation grant in 1977, the data are a continuation of studies going back to 1948. ANES studies include time series, pilot, and special studies such as panel studies.

ANES has been based at the University of Michigan since its origin and, since 2005, has been run in partnership with Stanford University, as well as Duke University and the University of Texas at Austin. Its principal investigators for the first four years of the partnership were Arthur Lupia and Jon Krosnick. In 2022, ANES received a $14 million grant to study the 2024 United States elections. University of Michigan professor Nicholas Valentino, Stanford University's Shanto Iyengar, Duke University's D. Sunshine Hillygus, and the University of Texas' Daron Shaw are principal investigators.

With more than 10,000 citations in published work, data spanning over 75 years, and more than 70 datasets, the American National Election Studies has acted as a cornerstone for public opinion research for more than 75 years, asking a representative sample of the American population survey questions before and after presidential elections. The ANES asks participants a wide scope of questions, ranging from the party identification of the respondent’s mother to their opinion on gay people in the military. In 2006, ANES opened the ANES Online Commons to allow interested scholars and survey professionals to propose questions for future surveys. Due to the ANES’ impressive research methods, it is commonly referred to as “the gold standard” of political science survey data.

The studies ask the same questions repeatedly over time and are frequently cited in works of political science. Early ANES data was the basis for The American Voter (1960). It is now used by scholars, students and journalists. It has allowed the detection of partisan bias in survey responses, showing that respondents' political affiliations contribute to their responses, extending even to questions with objective, known answers, such as whether or not Iraq had weapons of mass destruction.

== Data Download ==
On the American National Election Studies website, the data the study has collected since 1948 can be accessed and downloaded under the “Data Center” tab. This tab houses many datasets, including those for each year studied and a time series cumulative dataset that holds data from 1948 on. These datasets can be downloaded in many formats, including as a CSV file, which can be used when coding in R.

== Data Exploration Tools ==
The ANES offers three data exploration and visualization tools under the "Data Tools" tab.

1. The Guide to Public Opinion and Electoral Behavior
2. ANES Question Search: allows researchers to filter every ANES variable given a keyword to find the preferred variable.
3. ANES Continuity Guide: lists ANES questions by theme and every year in which the question (or similar question) appeared.

Additional tools using the ANES data have been independently developed for teaching and learning, such as ICPSR's SETUPS for undergraduates.
