= Political Psychology =

- Discipline: Political psychology, Psychology, political studies
- Language: English
- Edited by: Elizabeth Suhay & Mark Brandt

Publication details
- History: 1980–present
- Publisher: Wiley on behalf of the International Society of Political Psychology
- Frequency: Bimonthly
- Impact factor: 4.333 (2020)

Standard abbreviations
- ISO 4: Political Psychol.

Indexing
- CODEN: POPSEO
- ISSN: 0162-895X (print); 1467-9221 (web)
- LCCN: 79644318
- JSTOR: 0162895X
- OCLC no.: 44544062

Links
- Journal homepage; Online access; Online archive; Journal page at society website

Political Psychology is a peer-reviewed academic journal published bimonthly by Wiley on behalf of the International Society of Political Psychology. The editors-in-chief are Elizabeth Suhay of American University and Mark Brandt of Michigan State University.

== Subject matter ==
The journal of the International Society of Political Psychology is dedicated to the analysis of the interrelationships between psychological and political processes. International contributors draw on a diverse range of sources, including cognitive psychology, political science, economics, history, international relations, philosophy, political theory, sociology, and social and clinical psychology.

== Metrics ==
According to the Journal Citation Reports, the journal has a 2019 impact factor of 4.333, ranking it 22nd out of 182 journals in the category "Political Science" and 12th out of 65 journals in the category "Psychology Social". Political Psychology is in over 4,000 institutions worldwide, and in 2018 there were over 600,000 downloads of manuscripts published in the journal.

== Editors ==
The journal Political Psychology is housed at American University in Washington, DC, USA.

Editors-in-Chief: Elizabeth Suhay and Mark Brandt

== Advances in Political Psychology ==
Advances in Political Psychology is a second peer-reviewed publication of the International Society of Political Psychology. Given the continued growth and explosion of information and interest in political psychology, the society sensed there was an increasing need for a place where cumulative research findings and theoretical developments are synthesized and integrated in a form accessible to scholars, students, and practitioners. The Advances in Political Psychology annual series fills this need by recording the state of the field and highlighting innovative developments so that those who are interested can keep abreast of what is happening in political psychology. Each annual volume includes a selection articles that capture the diversity of subject matter studied by political psychologists.

== See also ==
- List of political science journals
- List of psychology journals
