= Eva Mueller =

American economist (1920–2006)

- Born: 1920; Germany
- Died: November 10, 2006 (aged 85–86); Ann Arbor, Michigan
- Education: Smith College; Harvard University
- Known for: studies of consumer behavior in the United States and economic demography in low income countries
- Awards: Carolyn Shaw Bell Award, 2001; Fellow of the American Statistical Association
- Scientific career
- Fields: Economics
- Workplaces: Federal Reserve Bank of New York; University of Michigan
- Doctoral advisor: Alvin Hansen

Eva Mueller (1920 – November 19, 2006) was a professor of economics and research scientist at the University of Michigan. She studied consumer behavior in the United States and economic demography in low-income countries, particularly the relationship between income change and fertility change. She also made contributions to survey methodology, including methods of collecting employment statistics and time-use data.

== Life ==
Mueller was born in Germany, where both of her parents were chemists, and her mother, who held a PhD in Chemistry but was not permitted to work after her marriage, encouraged her to earn a PhD. She fled the Nazis as a young teen. She graduated from Smith College in 1942, and then worked for the Federal Reserve Bank of New York until the end of the Second World War. With the help of her supervisor at the bank, she was admitted to the PhD program in economics at Harvard University, graduating in 1951.

When she finished her PhD, the head of the Economics department at Harvard told Mueller that he could not help a woman find a job in economics, and so she wrote letters to economists whose work she admired. One of these economists was George Katona, who hired her to work at the Institute for Social Research at the University of Michigan. She spent the remainder of her career at Michigan.

== Career ==
Mueller was a research scientist with the Institute for Social Research until her retirement. In 1957 she also joined the Department of Economics as a professor. She was also associated with the Center for Research in Economic Development, the Center for South and Southeast Asian Studies, and the Population Studies Center. During her career, Mueller was a Fellow of the American Statistical Association, and was elected vice-president of the Population Association of America. She received the 2001 Carolyn Shaw Bell Award from the American Economics Association, awarded by the Committee on the Status of Women in the Economics Profession “to an individual who has furthered the status of women in the economics profession, through example, achievements, increasing our understanding of how women can advance in the economics profession, or mentoring of others.”

Her research contributions were in the areas of consumer behavior in the United States, economic development and economic demography. She published paper on the impact of unemployment on consumer confidence in the United States, the economics of fertility decline in Taiwan, and the time allocation of women and children in Botswana. She also advised many graduate students in economic demography.

=== Selected works ===
- Katona, George; Mueller, Eva (1955). "A study of purchase decisions". Consumer behavior: The dynamics of consumer reaction 1. pp. 30–87.
- Lansing, John B; Mueller, Eva; Survey research center (Ann Arbor, Mich.) (1973). The geographic mobility of labor. Survey Research Center, University of Michigan.
- Mueller, Eva (1984). "The Value and Allocation of Time in Rural Botswana". Journal of Development Economics. 15 (1–3): 329–60. doi:10.1016/0304-3878(84)90022-1. hdl:2027.42/24795.
- Mueller, Eva (1976). "The economic value of children in peasant agriculture". In Ronald Gene Ridker (ed.). Population and development: The search for selective interventions. The Johns Hopkins University Press. pp. 98–153.
- Mueller, Eva; Morgan, James N. (1962). "Location decisions of manufacturers". The American Economic Review: 204–217.
- Mueller, Eva (1963). "Public attitudes toward fiscal programs". The Quarterly Journal of Economics. 77 (2): 210–235. doi:10.2307/1884400. JSTOR 1884400.
