= Indian consumer confidence index =

Consumer confidence is a key driver of economic growth and is widely considered a leading economic indicator of household spending on consumption. Consumers tend to increase consumption when they feel confident about the current and future economic situation of the country and their own financial conditions. In economies such as India and the US, where personal consumption accounts for more than 60% and 70% of gross domestic product respectively, consumer confidence has a particularly significant impact on the economy. Measuring it can provide critical insight into the economy's growth prospects. Consumer sentiment indices are essential tools used by global investors and will be an immense aid to individual and institutional investors in India.

== Methodology ==
The ZyFin Consumer Outlook Index (COI) is the first and only monthly, statistically robust index of consumer sentiment in India. The COI is designed to provide reliable insights into the direction of the Indian national and regional economies. Released once a month, the index is computed from the results of a monthly survey of 3,000 consumers in 11 cities across India. The ZyFin Consumer Outlook Index was developed by a team of financial economists and statisticians led by Dr. Sam Thomas, Ph.D. and Debopam Chaudhuri, Chief Economist at ZyFin. It is a barometer for assessing macro-economic conditions and their implications on markets in the near term.

=== Aggregate indices ===
Consumer Outlook Index (COI)
Based on questions regarding respondents' sentiment covering a variety of economically significant factors (both current and expected).

Present Situation Index
Based on questions relating only to current sentiment of respondents over a variety of economically significant factors.

Future Expectations Index
Based on questions relating only to future sentiment of respondents over a variety of economically significant factors.

=== Sub-indices ===
Spending Sentiment Index
1. Willingness to spend on purchasing major consumer durables
2. Willingness to spend on purchasing vehicles
3. Willingness to spend on purchasing homes
It measures consumers' overall spending plan on necessities as well as discretionary purchase for the next few months. With a six-month lead on BSE Consumer Durables Index, it is useful in predicting sales growth for consumer goods, vehicles and homes.

Employment Sentiment Index
1. Current and expected sentiment on the unemployment situation
2. Current and expected sentiment on personal job security (own/family members'/friends')
It reflects consumers' perception of the prevailing and expected employment situation in India. It is a strong indicator of the prospects of the services sector.

Inflation Sentiment Index
1. Current and expected sentiment on interest rates
2. Current and expected level of prices of all goods on average
It tracks price increases felt and expected by consumers. It exhibits a strong correlation with interest rate movements in the economy.

Basic Necessities Spending Index
It charts trends in consumer spending on basic necessities and offers a strong proxy to on-the-ground inflation. It can be used in conjunction with the Inflation Sentiment Index to forecast inflation and interest rates in the economy.

Durables Spending Index
It captures consumers' plans to purchase consumer durables, providing the opportunity to project sales six months in advance.

Vehicle Spending Index
Vehicle Spending Index signals consumers' plans to buy passenger vehicles in India over the next 6 months, providing a strong tool to forecast demand.

Real estate spending Index
It measures consumers' plans to buy homes over the next six months to a year

Borrowing Comfort Index
Borrowing Comfort Index quantifies consumers' comfort in borrowing to finance big ticket products, such as homes, vehicles and consumer durables. In conjunction with the spending indices, it is a good predictor of demand for retail loans.

== Data ==
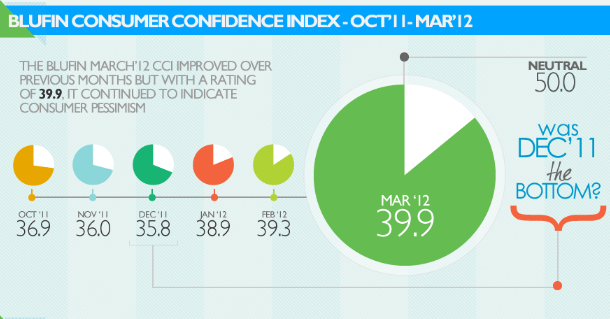

At 39.9 for the month of March 2012, the Aggregate CCI Index reflects pessimism about the economy among Indian consumers. CCI score of under 50 reflects pessimism and over 50 reflects optimism.

Besides the Aggregate score of 39.9, other highlights of the CCI March 2012 include:

1. The Aggregate CCI had its lowest score of 35.8 in December 2011. Since then, there has been a positive trend but consumers remain pessimistic.
2. Concerns about the future are prominent in the consumer's mind, as indicated by the CCI's Future Expectations score of 37.6 in March 2012, lower than the CCI aggregate score of 39.9.

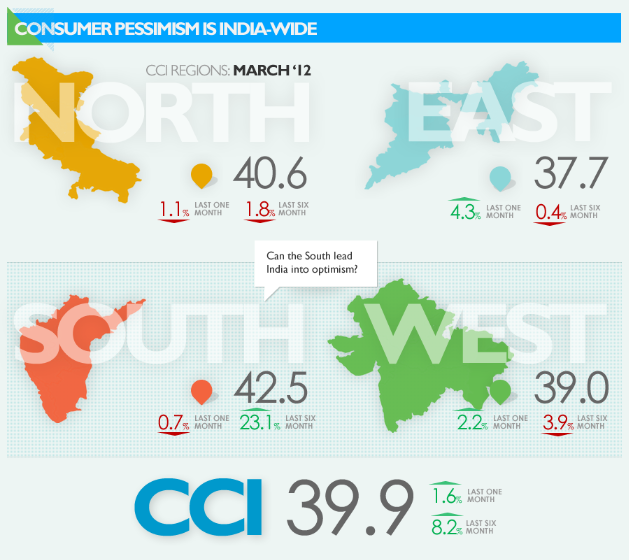

In contrast, the Present Situation score of 45.7 was above the Aggregate CCI in March 2012. #While all three sub-indices mentioned above indicated a Pessimistic Sentiment, the Inflation Sentiment Index, at 23.5 in March 2012 was the biggest drag on overall consumer sentiment. #Respondents in South India showed a marginally more positive sentiment than those in other regions, however they also remain pessimistic.

== See also ==
- Consumer confidence
- Consumer confidence index

== Sources ==
- "Consumer Outlook | Real Estate | Inflation | Index | India | ZyFin". Archived from the original on 2 October 2015.
