= Attila Melegh =

Hungarian Sociologist

Attila László Melegh Ph. D

Academic background
- Education: Karl Marx University of Budapest, BA in Sociology; BA in Economics; University of Debrecen, Ph. D in History; Corvinus University of Budapest, Dr. Habil.

Academic work
- Discipline: Sociology
- Sub-discipline: Migration studies
- Institutions: Tomori Pál College; Corvinus University
- Notable works: On the East/West Slope. Globalization, Nationalism, Racism and Discourses on Central and Eastern Europe.; Knowledge and beliefs about national development and developmental hierarchies: The viewpoints of ordinary people in thirteen countries; Perceptions of societal developmental hierarchies in Europe and beyond: A Bulgarian perspective
- Website: https://meleghattila.com

Attila Melegh is a Hungarian sociologist and the president of Demographic Committee of the Hungarian Academy of Sciences. He is currently associate professor at Corvinus University of Budapest, and a senior research fellow at Hungarian Demographic Research institute.

== Early life and education ==
Melegh obtained dual bachelor's degrees in sociology and economics from Karl Marx University of Economic Sciences. His thesis, entitled A tizenkilencedik század eleji városi háztartások Buda Újlakon [Family and Household Formation in Buda in the Early 19th Century], underscored his early academic pursuits.

On June 8, 2002, he completed his Ph.D. in history in University of Debrecen, with his dissertation titled Population Change and Agrarian Towns between the 18th and 20th Centuries. In April 2021, Melegh was conferred the title of Dr. Habil from Corvinus University of Budapest for his work Comparative Analysis of Demographic and Migratory Processes and Discourses: Methods and Problems.

== Career ==
Melegh has held several academic positions throughout his career. From 1997 on, he has been working as a senior researcher at the Demographic Research Institute.

In the 1996–1997 academic year, he participated in the Fulbright Program as a lecturer on Hungarian Social History in Rutgers University

In 2009, Melegh was appointed as an associate professor at Corvinus University of Budapest, where he continues to engage in academic activities. He also served as a college professor at Pal Tomori College from 2009 to 2017, during which time he initiated an international studies program. Melegh established the Karl Polányi Research Center for Global Social Studies at Corvinus University and served as a founding director from 2014 to 2022.

In June 2015, he became involved in a controversy related to migration issues. Origo.hu, a pro-government news website published his remark that people who come from almost everywhere to the developed countries are better than the domestic population. As Válasz.hu reported, Melegh cited pre-2015 data indicating that immigrants to Hungary exhibited higher levels of education and greater participation in the Hungarian labor market compared to native Hungarians.

For Summer 2024 he has been selected as a Vienna Karl Polanyi Visiting Professor at Vienna University of Economics and Business, where he will conduct a PhD seminar, an internal workshop, and deliver an open lecture titled "Balancing the Imbalanced".

He is the managing editor for the English edition of Demográfia, an annual journal of the Demographic Committee at the Hungarian Academy of Sciences and of the Hungarian Demographic Research Institute.

Melegh is a member of advisory board at Journal Stanovnistvo, a Serbian journal of Population Studies, and Comparativ, official journal of the European Network in Universal and Global History, where he is a member of the steering committee.

In 2025, Melegh appeared as an interviewee in the Partizán documentary 10 év gyűlölet [Ten Years of Hate], which examines the Hungarian government’s fear- and hate-based propaganda from 2015 to 2025.

In the same year, he received the Academy Awards from Hungarian Academy of Sciences at the celebration of the organisation's 200th anniversary.

== Selected publications ==
=== Books ===
- Melegh, Attila - Éva Kovács - Irén Gödri (2009). "Azt hittem célt tévesztettem": A bevándorló nők élettörténeti perspektívái, integrációja és a bevándorlókkal kapcsolatos attitűdök nyolc európai országban ('I thought I missed the target. Life course perspective, integration of female immigrants and attitudes toward immigrants in eight European countries) Bp, Hungary : Központi Statisztikai Hivatal Népességtudományi Kutatóintézet (2010) Budapest. ISBN 9789639597174
- Melegh, Attila (2006). On the East/West Slope. Globalization, Nationalism, Racism and Discourses on Central and Eastern Europe. New York-Budapest, CEU Press. ISBN 9789637326240
- Melegh, Attila (2001). Kiskunhalas népesedéstörténete a 17. század végétől a 20. század elejéig (The Population History of Kiskunhalas from the 17th century till the early 20th century), Bp, Hungary : Központi Statisztikai Hivatal Népességtudományi Kutatóintézet (2000). ISBN 9637109692
- Melegh, Attila (2023). The Migration Turn and Eastern Europe: A Global Historical Sociological Analysis, Palgrave MacMillan, pp 423. ISBN 9783031142932

=== Articles ===
- Thornton, Arland; Binstock, Georgina; Abbasi-Shavazi, Mohammad Jalal; Ghimire, Dirgha; Gjonca, Arjan; Melegh, Attila; Mitchell, Colter; Moaddel, Mansoor; Xie, Yu; Yang, Li-shou; Young-DeMarco, Linda; Yount, Kathryn M, (2012) Knowledge and beliefs about national development and developmental hierarchies: The viewpoints of ordinary people in thirteen countries, Social Science Research. p. 1053-1068
- Melegh, Attila, (2016) Unequal exchanges and the radicalization of demographic nationalism in Hungary, Intersections. Eastern European Journal of Society and Politics. 2(4), p. 87-108
- Fassmann, Heinz; Musil, Elisabeth; Bauer, Ramon; Melegh, Attila; Gruber, Kathrin,(2014) Longer-Term Demographic Dynamics in South–East Europe: Convergent, Divergent and Delayed Development. Central and Eastern European Migration Review, 3(2), pp. 150–172. ISSN 2300-1682
- Melegh, Attila; Thornton, Arland; Philipov, Dimiter; Young-DeMarco, Linda, (2013) European Sociological Review, 29(3), pp. 603–615
- Melegh, Attila; Vancsó, Anna; Hunyadi, Márton; Mendly, Dorottya, (2019) Positional Insecurity and the Hegemony of Radical Nationalism. Migration and Justice in the Hungarian Media. The International Spectator, vol. 54.
- Melegh, Attila (2019) The Fear of Population Replacement. GLOBAL DIALOGUE, 9(3), Paper online.
