= Patricia A. Berglund =

Researcher at the University of Michigan's Institute for Social Research

Patricia Berglund
- Born: Waukesha, WI
- Education: Northwestern University, BA, MBA
- Known for: Research in mental health, substance abuse in youth, survey methodology
- Scientific career
- Fields: Data management and analysis, psychology, psychiatry
- Workplaces: University of Michigan Institute for Social Research

Patricia A. Berglund is a researcher at the University of Michigan's Institute for Social Research. She was included in the 2014, 2015 and 2016 Clarivate Analytics lists of "highly cited researchers" in the fields of psychiatry and psychology.

She is an advocate for the expansion of screening and improvement in treatment quality for major depressive disorder, arguing that failure to make prompt initial treatment contact is a pervasive shortcoming of mental health care in the United States.

== Background and career ==
Berglund's hometown is Waukesha, Wisconsin, and she earned a BA in Music from Northwestern University's Bienen School of Music and an MBA from the Kellogg School of Management at Northwestern University in 1988. Before joining the University of Michigan in 1993, she worked as a tennis teacher and research analyst.

Berglund has authored or co-authored several books and publications and is an instructor for courses in data analysis and SAS software. Currently, her research focuses on mental health using national and global mental health surveys such as Monitoring the Future, the National Comorbidity Survey, and the World Mental Health survey initiative.

The SAS Institute has awarded her its Best Contributed Paper title in Statistics and Data Analysis.

== Works ==
Journal articles

- Berglund, Patricia; Borges, Guilherme; Nock, Matthew; Wang, Philip S.; Kessler, Ronald C. (May 25, 2005). "Trends in Suicide Ideation, Plans, Gestures, and Attempts in the United States, 1990-1992 to 2001-2003". JAMA. 293 (20): 2487–2495. doi:10.1001/jama.293.20.2487. PMID 15914749.
- Kessler; et al. (June 18, 2003). "The epidemiology of major depressive disorder: results from the National Comorbidity Survey Replication (NCS-R)". JAMA. 289 (23): 3095–105. Bibcode:2003JAMA..289.3095K. doi:10.1001/jama.289.23.3095. PMID 12813115.
- Kessler, R. C.; Cantrell, C. R.; Berglund, P.; Sokol, M. C. (2007). "The Effects of Copayments on Medication Adherence During the First Two Years of Prescription Drug Treatment". Journal of Occupational and Environmental Medicine. 49 (6): 597–609. doi:10.1097/JOM.0b013e318057772b. PMID 17563602. S2CID 5760315.
- Uebelacker, L. A.; Wang, P. S.; Berglund, P.; Kessler, R. C. (2006). "Clinical differences among patients treated for mental health problems in general medical and specialty mental health settings in the National Comorbidity Survey Replication". General Hospital Psychiatry. 28 (5): 387–395. doi:10.1016/j.genhosppsych.2006.05.001. PMC 2694036. PMID 16950373.
- Wang, P. S.; Berglund, P.; Olfson, M.; Pincus, H. A.; Wells, K. B.; Kessler, R. C. (2005). "Failure and Delay in Initial Treatment Contact After First Onset of Mental Disorders in the National Comorbidity Survey Replication". Archives of General Psychiatry. 62 (6): 603–13. doi:10.1001/archpsyc.62.6.603. PMID 15939838.
- Kessler, R. C.; Berglund, P.; Demler, O.; Jin, R.; Merikangas, K. R.; Walters, E. E. (2005). "Lifetime Prevalence and Age-of-Onset Distributions of DSM-IV Disorders in the National Comorbidity Survey Replication". Archives of General Psychiatry. 62 (6): 593–602. doi:10.1001/archpsyc.62.6.593. PMID 15939837.
- Kessler, R. C.; Berglund, P.; Chiu, W. T.; Demler, O.; Heeringa, S.; Hiripi, E.; Jin, R.; Pennell, B. E.; Walters, E. E.; Zaslavsky, A.; Zheng, H. (2004). "The US National Comorbidity Survey Replication (NCS-R): Design and field procedures". International Journal of Methods in Psychiatric Research. 13 (2): 69–92. doi:10.1002/mpr.167. hdl:2027.42/34222. PMC 6878537. PMID 15297905.
- Kessler, R. C.; Merikangas, K. R.; Berglund, P.; Eaton, W. W.; Koretz, D. S.; Walters, E. E. (2003). "Mild Disorders Should Not Be Eliminated from the DSM-V". Archives of General Psychiatry. 60 (11): 1117–22. doi:10.1001/archpsyc.60.11.1117. PMID 14609887.
- Kessler, R. C.; Barber, C.; Beck, A.; Berglund, P.; Cleary, P. D.; McKenas, D.; Pronk, N.; Simon, G.; Stang, P.; Ustun, T. B.; Wang, P. (2003). "The World Health Organization Health and Work Performance Questionnaire (HPQ)". Journal of Occupational and Environmental Medicine. 45 (2): 156–174. Bibcode:2003JOEM...45..156K. doi:10.1097/01.jom.0000052967.43131.51. PMID 12625231. S2CID 1245200.
- Andrade, L.; Caraveo-Anduaga, J. J.; Berglund, P.; Bijl, R. V.; Graaf, R. D.; Vollebergh, W.; Dragomirecka, E.; Kohn, R.; Keller, M.; Kessler, R. C.; Kawakami, N.; Kiliç, C.; Offord, D.; Bedirhan Ustun, T.; Wittchen, H. U. (2003). "The epidemiology of major depressive episodes: Results from the International Consortium of Psychiatric Epidemiology (ICPE) surveys" (PDF). International Journal of Methods in Psychiatric Research. 12 (1): 3–21. doi:10.1002/mpr.138. hdl:2027.42/34221. PMC 6878531. PMID 12830306.
- Wang, P. S.; Beck, A.; Berglund, P.; Leutzinger, J. A.; Pronk, N.; Richling, D.; Schenk, T. W.; Simon, G.; Stang, P.; Ustun, T. B.; Kessler, R. C. (2003). "Chronic Medical Conditions and Work Performance in the Health and Work Performance Questionnaire Calibration Surveys". Journal of Occupational and Environmental Medicine. 45 (12): 1303–1311. doi:10.1097/01.jom.0000100200.90573.df. PMID 14665817. S2CID 39934666.
- Almeida, David M.; Berglund, Patricia; Stang, Paul; Kessler, Ronald C. (October 2001). "Pollen and mold exposure impairs the work performance of employees with allergic rhinitis". Annals of Allergy, Asthma & Immunology. 87 (4): 289–295. doi:10.1016/S1081-1206(10)62242-9. PMID 11686420.
- Wang, P. S.; Berglund, P.; Kessler, R. C. (2000). "Recent care of common mental disorders in the united states" (PDF). Journal of General Internal Medicine. 15 (5): 284–292. doi:10.1046/j.1525-1497.2000.9908044.x. PMC 1495452. PMID 10840263.

Books

- "Multiple Imputation of Missing Data Using SAS" (SAS Institute, 2014) ISBN 978-1-61290-452-8
- "Applied Survey Data Analysis" (CRC Press, 2010) co-author with Steven G. Heeringa and Brady T. West. ISBN 978-1-4200-8066-7
