= Theoderic the Great: King of Goths, Ruler of Romans =

2023 biography of Theoderic the Great

- Cover
- Author: Hans-Ulrich Wiemer
- Original title: Theoderich der Große
- Translator: John Noël Dillon
- Language: English
- Subject: Theoderic the Great, Ostrogoths, Late antiquity, Gothic War (535–554)
- Genre: Historical biography
- Publisher: Yale University Press
- Publication date: 2018, German, 2023 English
- Publication place: United States
- English publication date: 2023
- Media type: Print (Hardcover)
- Pages: 664
- ISBN: 978-0-300-25443-3

Theoderic the Great: King of Goths, Ruler of Romans is a 2023 English-language biography of the Ostrogothic king Theoderic the Great (r. 493–526) by German historian Hans-Ulrich Wiemer. Originally published in German as Theoderich der Große (2018, with a second revised edition in 2025), the book was published in English by Yale University Press, and translated by John Noël Dillon. Wiemer examines Theoderic's conquest of Italy, his thirty-three-year reign over a kingdom that included Goths and Romans, and the rapid collapse of Ostrogothic power following his death. Wiemer argues that Theoderic maintained stability through a policy of "integration through separation," preserving distinct roles for Gothic warriors and Roman administrators while this same separation ultimately prevented the creation of a unified society capable of surviving external pressures. The English edition incorporates substantial revisions and updates to the original German text, including expanded notes and a bibliography. A Chinese translation, titled 蛮族之王 (Mánzú zhī Wáng; "King of the Barbarians"), was published by Social Sciences Academic Press in 2025.

== Summary ==
Wiemer traces the transformation of Theoderic from a Gothic war lord into the ruler of a stable kingdom encompassing Italy, Dalmatia, and portions of the western Balkans, southern France, and the Iberian Peninsula.

The work opens by establishing the historical context through an investigation of Theoderic's early life and the contemporary sources available for studying his reign, especially the panegyric on Theoderic by the Catholic cleric Ennodius, the Anonymus Valesianus, the classicizing history of the emperor Justinian's Wars Procopius, and the Variae written by the Roman senator Cassiodorus for Theoderic and his successors. The author addresses fundamental questions about Gothic identity, rejecting traditional Germanic interpretations while exploring the complex relationship between ethnic labels and political allegiances in late antiquity.

Wirmer recounts the Ostrogoths' trajectory from their subjugation under Hunnic dominance through their emergence as a distinct political force in the Balkans. Wiemer details Theoderic's decade as a hostage in Constantinople during his youth, his subsequent operations in the Balkans often while holding imperial office, and his conquest of Italy between 489 and 493 at the behest of Emperor Zeno. Wiemer focuses on the consolidation of Theoderic's power in Italy forms and his governing strategy which Wiemer describes as "integration through separation" – a dual state system that maintained distinct roles for Gothic warriors as military specialists and Roman civilians in administrative positions, while preserving existing governmental structures and respecting the privileges of both the senatorial elite and the Catholic Church, despite the king's adherence to Homoean Christianity.

Wiemer audits the institutional framework of Theoderic's dual state and demonstrates the remarkable continuity of Roman administrative structures alongside Gothic military organization. The author then inspects Theoderic's foreign policy through his construction of a web of marriage alliances with other post-Roman rulers and his (ultimately failed) attempts to position himself as the paternal head of a "family of kings" in western Europe, serving both as mediator and peace-keeper. Wiemer also covers the social relations and economic conditions in Italy and the often delicate relations between the Homoean king and the Catholic bishops—illustrating how Theoderic successfully navigated religious diversity while maintaining political stability for three decades.

Near the end of the book, the author addresses the succession crisis that emerged after the unexpected death of Theoderic's son-in-law Eutharic. The king had an increasingly strained relationship with the Roman senatorial class in his final years. This is marked by the execution of the philosopher Boethius and the imprisonment of Pope John I. Wiemer traces the rapid dissolution of the Gothic kingdom following Theoderic's death in 526, through the weakened regency of his daughter Amalasuintha for his young grandson Athalaric, the failed dual monarchy experiment of Amalasuintha and Theodahad, and ultimately the seventeen-year Gothic War launched by Emperor Justinian that concluded in 552 with the complete destruction of the Ostrogothic kingdom and the disappearance of the Goths as a distinct political entity. While the kingdom founded by Theoderic in Italy collapsed after only two generations, the king had a remarkable afterlife in the Germanic-speaking parts of Medieval Europe, transforming from a historical figure into the legendary Dietrich von Bern in medieval Germanic epics.

The author tries to emphasize the fundamental paradox of Theoderic's reign: while his policy of integration through separation successfully provided Italy with an unprecedented period of peace and stability, this very separation prevented the fusion of Gothic and Roman elements that might have created a more durable political structure, leaving the kingdom vulnerable to dissolution when succession crises coincided with Byzantine imperial ambitions.

== Critical reception ==
The book received more than twenty reviews in English, German, French, Italian and Polish. (Note: Das Historisch-politische Buch 67 (2019), 334 Timo Klär (in German)) (Note: Deutsches Archiv 267 (2019), 267-269 Frank M. Ausbüttel (in German)) (Note: Kwartalnik Historyczny Rocznik 36 (2019), 125-130 Robert Kasperski in Polish)) (Note: Antiquité Tardive 27 (2019), 391-395 Fabrizio Oppedisano (in Italian)) (Note: Studi medievali 62 (2021), 902-908 Marco Cristini (in Italian)) (Note: Die Tagespost (22.09.2019) Clemens Schlip) (Note: Die Welt (12.11.2018) Berthold Seewald) (Note: Damals (16.07.2018) Rudolf Simek) (Note: Süddeutsche Zeitung (19.06.2018) Stefan Rebenich)

Wiemer's biography, John Moorhead wrote, was an "impressive" achievement that elevated scholarship on Theoderic to a new level. The author marshaled a wide array of sources—including the Variae of Cassiodorus, Theoderic's legal code, and lesser-known hagiographical texts—while also incorporating archaeological evidence, and proved an astute reader capable of synthesizing these materials in unexpected ways. Moorhead found the book's extended thematic discussions—which functioned as semi-independent essays on topics such as the deposition of the last western emperor in 476, slavery, urban life, and the composition of the Roman senate—the book's strongest sections. He praised Wiemer's discussion of Theoderic's "integration through separation" policy and the analysis of how Theoderic's government positioned itself between personal rule and institutional administration. Moorhead raised minor reservations: he questioned whether Tacitus's remarks on Germanic adultery could reliably illuminate sixth-century Gothic society, found some presentational choices (such as describing Theoderic's table as "jovial but not egalitarian") to lack clear evidentiary basis, and presenting an alternative interpretation of Theoderic's troubled final years that linked the parallel fates of Boethius and Pope John to their earlier alliance during the Laurentian schism. Moorhead considered the book's depth of learning was unmatched among scholarly treatments of the subject and predicted it would remain the standard work for many years.

Rene Pfeilschifter called the book "ein großer Wurf" (a major achievement), distinguished by its command of the scholarship, breadth of perspective, and sober, nuanced judgment. Pfeilschifter commended Wiemer for avoiding any attempt at psychological portraiture—given the hopeless state of the sources for Theoderic's inner life—and instead interpreting the king's actions functionally: Theoderic killed rivals with his own hand not out of cruelty but to demonstrate personal prowess before his Gothic followers, and his mild demeanor upon entering Rome fulfilled the public role expected by the senate and people rather than signaling newfound peacefulness. Pfeilschifter mentioned how Wiemer framed the Ostrogothic kingdom itself as the central problem: how did Theoderic stabilize his rule over a subject population divided between native Italians and Germanic warriors separated by language, religion, dress, and historical memory? The book's systematic investigation of administration, taxation, law, religion, construction, foreign policy, and social hierarchy addressed this question, with Pfeilschifter pointing to the social-historical sections on peasants and slaves as particularly impressive, forming a counterpart to Wiemer's portrait of the Gothic warrior community that had lost its connection to settled agricultural life before arriving in Italy.

In his review for his History Today, David M. Gwynn praised the book as excellent and regarded the effort to bring Theoderic, his kingdom, and his world to life as an outstanding achievement. Gwynn mentioned the expert revision for the English translation and welcomed how Wiemer set the scene with essential background elements. However, he identified several areas where he believed more analysis was needed. He argued that while Wiemer correctly emphasized Theoderic's "integration through separation" policy, the book should have explored more thoroughly why this approach proved fundamentally flawed in the long term, as ongoing divisions between Goths and Romans created fracture lines that opened during crises. Gwynn also felt the book gave insufficient attention to Theoderic's contradictory legacy as both heretical persecutor and Germanic champion, and thought the king's transformation into the medieval hero Dietrich von Bern required more detailed treatment for English-speaking readers. Nevertheless, Gwynn concluded that Wiemer's meticulously researched and superbly presented argument successfully reinforced his vision of Theoderic as a leader confronting challenges that remain relevant today, and he considered the book one that offered much to inspire readers while providing Theoderic with the foundation he deserved.

Jonathan J. Arnold considered it as more than a biography, and described it as an extensive survey whose breadth and scope rendered it an invaluable resource for scholars. For Arnold, the work was not particularly novel in its claims and in many respects reasserted older ideas rather than breaking new ground. He found certain methodological choices problematic, especially Wiemer's occasional attempts at what he called "telepathy" in speculating about what Theoderic's Goths wanted or felt given the limited evidence, which he found odd and unconvincing. He also highlighted how specialists would find material to dispute, especially since Wiemer did not always engage with alternative interpretations, even in his notes.

In his review for the New York Times, Jamie Kreiner found Wiemer's biography impressively deep and richly detailed for a historical period that remained sparse in popular culture and general knowledge. Kreiner praised the academic yet substantive approach, stating that readers would likely be stunned by the thoroughness of Wiemer's work. She welcomed how the work revealed the constraints that governed different social strata in late antiquity and captured the unassuming nature of social change through subtle mutual adaptation. Kreiner admired how the book showed both the structural and contingent forces of late Roman history, though she thought that even after Wiemer's expansive treatment—which included extensive sections on economy, demography, trade, slavery, religion, and administration—Theoderic remained elusive as a ruler, with his reign appearing variously inspiring, disappointing, or ordinary depending on one's perspective.

David Stewart Bachrach found Wiemer's account strongest in its treatment of late Roman legal and governmental institutions, taxation, and church organization, but identified what he considered as multiple shortcomings in the military analysis that disappointed him. Bachrach considered Wiemer's discussion of military forces problematic, especially the assertion that an army of 20,000-25,000 Ostrogoths simultaneously conducted operations across multiple regions while also defending Italy's coasts and maintaining garrison control. Bachrach viewed as questionable Wiemer's claims about Roman military incapacity and his reliance on later accounts to support assertions about Theodoric's personal conduct in battle. He thought that Wiemer failed to discuss the origins and organization of naval forces, siege specialists, and logistics operations, and omitted citations of leading Anglophone scholars on late imperial military matters. Bachrach found Wiemer's effort to present Theodoric as a "Germanic" warlord rather than a Roman-trained imperial official unconvincing, and concluded that while the volume contained substantial information useful to specialists and students, its analytical framework and conclusions regarding military affairs and Theodoric himself required great caution.

The German historian Ulrich Lambrecht praised it as a work that deserved serious attention and established itself as an unavoidable reference for anyone studying Theoderic. Lambrecht liked how Wiemer guided readers through current research questions with clarity and created solid foundations for spreading new understanding of migrating groups like the Ostrogoths and Theoderic's exceptional kingdom in Italy. Lambrecht also welcomed Wiemer's careful approach to sources, especially his skepticism toward archaeological evidence and his thorough historicization of Gothic origins through scholarly traditions. He considered the biography a model example that successfully replaced Wilhelm Enßlin's outdated post-war work from the mid-twentieth century and provided a contemporary reinterpretation suited to current research paradigms.

Theodor Kissel praised the book as a brilliantly written and profound study of power-political transformation processes during a transitional period. Kissel found Wiemer's interpretation compelling—that Theoderic succeeded through "integration by separation," maintaining a clever division of labor where Romans handled civilian administration while Goths controlled the military. He saw this as a pragmatic partnership rather than a merging of peoples, describing it as two groups existing side by side in a functional arrangement born of political necessity. Kissel thought that the work set new standards for future publications on this subject and effectively illuminated how social groups penetrated the late Roman Empire and contributed to the emergence of early medieval Europe.

Brian Swain criticized the minimal and overly concise footnotes in Wiemer's monograph and wished the author had more explicitly mapped scholarly debates and articulated how his work contradicted prevailing interpretations that emphasized Roman continuities or denied Gothic cultural distinctiveness. Despite this reservation, he praised it as the finest single-author work on Theoderic and his kingdom. The book's substantial length was justified, Swain argued, by its comprehensive world-building and immersive, textured reconstruction that drew extensively from sources. The reviewer said he was impressed by the companion edited volume, with its diverse methodological approaches and measured conclusions that accepted source limitations.

Herwig Wolfram considered the biography long overdue and thanked Wiemer for finally producing it. Wolfram praised Wiemer for successfully telling "a different story" as intended and noted that the publisher granted him an unusual privilege by imposing no length restrictions - a privilege, he thought, Wiemer used exceptionally well. Despite pointing out minor errors, such as a mistaken name on page 81 (corrected in the English edition), Wolfram described it as an "opus magnum" - a monumental achievement with only trivial blemishes. The reviewer noticed how Wiemer extensive covered in great details all relevant themes without omission, including Theoderic's acquisition of power in Italy, his religious policies and the economic arrangements for his warrior bands.

In the Wall Street Journal, Kyle Harper assessed it as the most important treatment of Theoderic since Wilhelm Ensslin's 1947 work, declaring it superior in both breadth and sophistication. Harper judged it as a monumental exploration that demonstrated mastery of recent scholarship on late antiquity, often finding Wiemer convincing on domestic and foreign policy matters. However, he noticed a weakness in the explanation of how Theoderic's achievements unraveled. Harper argued that insufficient attention was given to the period after Theoderic's death and that Wiemer underestimated the impact of bubonic plague.

Steve Donoghue said the book is a towering achievement, mentioning that the appearance of an English translation just five years after the 2018 German original represented a pleasant surprise given its density and length. Donoghue deemed the volume as rock-solid with calm erudition and massive scholarly apparatus, including 65 pages of endnotes and a further 65 pages of lavishly annotated bibliography.

== Editions ==
The book was originally published in German by C.H. Beck in 2018 under the title Theoderich der Große: König der Goten, Herrscher der Römer. A second revised German edition appeared in July 2025.

The English translation by John Noël Dillon was published by Yale University Press in 2023. This edition incorporated substantial revisions and updates to the original German text, including expanded notes and a revised bibliography. The translation was supported by a grant from the Geisteswissenschaften International Translation Prize, awarded in 2020.

A Chinese translation, titled 蛮族之王 (Mánzú zhī Wáng; "King of the Barbarians"), with the subtitle 狄奥多里克与罗马帝国的黄昏 ("Theoderic and the Twilight of the Roman Empire"), was published by Social Sciences Academic Press (社会科学文献出版社) in July 2025. The translation, by Zeng Yue (曾悦), was based on the English edition and appeared in the publisher's Thorn Bird (索·恩) series.
