= Yu Xie =

Chinese American sociologist (born 1959)

- 谢宇
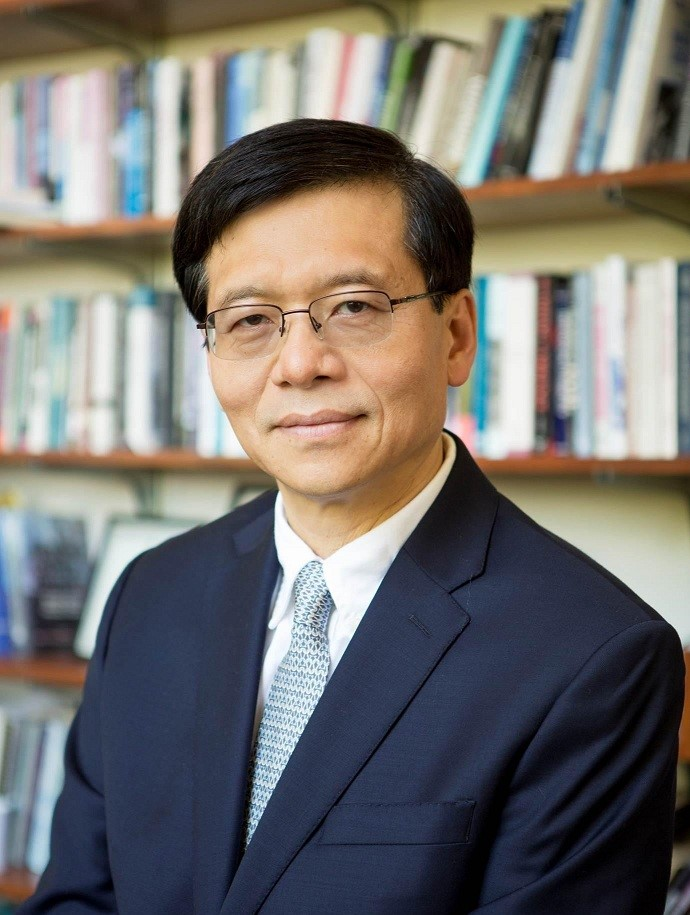
- Born: 1959 (age 66–67); Zhenjiang, Jiangsu, China
- Citizenship: China (1959–1997); United States (1997–present)
- Education: Shanghai University of Technology (BS); University of Wisconsin–Madison (MA, MS, PhD)
- Known for: Log-Multiplicative Layer Effect Model, Three Principles of Social Science, Chinese Family Panel Studies
- Scientific career
- Fields: Sociology
- Institutions: University of Michigan; Peking University; Princeton University; Academia Sinica
- Website: sociology.princeton.edu/people/yu-xie

Yu Xie (Chinese: 谢宇; pinyin: Xiè Yǔ; born 1959) is a Chinese-born American sociologist and a sociology professor at Princeton University. He joined the University of Michigan as an assistant professor in 1989 and served as a professor from 1996 to 2015.

Xie has made contributions to quantitative methodology, social stratification, demography, Chinese studies, sociology of science, and social science data collection. He was Otis Dudley Duncan Distinguished University Professor of Sociology, Statistics, and Public Policy at the University of Michigan. He is a member of the American Academy of Arts and Sciences, Academia Sinica, and the National Academy of Sciences.

== Early life and education ==
Xie was born in Zhenjiang, Jiangsu, China, in 1959, the second of two brothers. His parents were both physicians. Xie's education was delayed by the Cultural Revolution in China, but he was eventually able to enroll in the Shanghai University of Technology, where he received a B.S. in metallurgical engineering in 1982. He then came to the United States to study at the University of Wisconsin-Madison, where he earned an M.A. in the history of science and an M.S. in sociology in 1984 as well as a Ph.D. in sociology in 1989.

== Academic career ==
After completing his doctorate, Xie came to the University of Michigan as an assistant professor, where he was appointed associate professor in 1994 and full professor in 1996. He became an American citizen in 1997. Xie lived in Ann Arbor with his wife and their two children for 26 years before moving to Princeton.

Along with his sociology appointment, Xie has held various positions in other departments at the University of Michigan. He was appointed Professor of Statistics in 2000 and Professor of Public Policy in 2011. Xie is also a research professor at the Population Studies Center and the Survey Research Center of the Institute for Social Research, and a Faculty Associate at the Center for Chinese Studies. Since 1999, he has been directing the Quantitative Methodology Program at the Survey Research Center. During his over twenty years of career at the University of Michigan, Xie held multiple chair professorships. In 2007, he was appointed Otis Dudley Duncan University Distinguished Professor.

Xie has been active in promoting empirical sociology in China. His primary institutional affiliation in China has been with Peking University, where he has directed the China Family Panel Studies (CFPS), China's largest national longitudinal social science data collection project and founded the Social Research Center. Xie has also been active at several other institutions in China, holding honorary adjunct professorships at Renmin University of China, Hong Kong University of Science and Technology, Chinese University of Hong Kong, and Shanghai University.

After 26 years at Michigan, Xie moved to Princeton in 2015.

== Professional recognition ==
- Fellowship Invitation, Center for Advanced Study in the Behavioral Sciences (1990).
- Spencer Fellowship, National Academy of Education (1991-1992).
- Young Investigator Award, National Science Foundation (1992-1997).
- Faculty Scholar Award, William T. Grant Foundation (1994-1999).
- Member, Sociological Research Association (1997).
- Chair, Section on Sociological Methodology, the American Sociological Association (2001-2003).
- Guggenheim Fellowship, John Simon Guggenheim Memorial Foundation (2002-2003).
- Fellow, American Academy of Arts and Science (2004).
- Academician, Academia Sinica, Taiwan (2004).
- Distinguished Lecturer Award, the Center for the Study of Women, Science, and Technology (WST), Georgia Institute of Technology (2006).
- Clifford C. Clogg Award, Population Association of America (2008).
- Zhu Kezhen Distinguished Lecturer, Zhejiang University, China (2008).
- Member, National Academy of Sciences (2009).
- Wei-Lun Visiting Professorship, Chinese University of Hong Kong (2010).
- The Henry and Bryna David Lecture at the National Research Council (April 2013).

== Books ==
- Powers, Daniel A. and Yu Xie. 2000. Statistical Methods for Categorical Data Analysis. New York: Academic Press.
- Powers, Daniel A. and Yu Xie. 2008. Statistical Methods for Categorical Data Analysis, Second Edition. Howard House, England: Emerald.
  - Chinese translation: 《分类数据分析的统计方法》（第2版）. 北京: Social Sciences Literature Press, 2009.
- Xie, Yu and Kimberlee A. Shauman. 2003. Women in Science: Career Processes and Outcomes. Cambridge, MA: Harvard University Press.
  - Reviewed in Science (2003), Nature (2004), Choice (2004), and Contemporary Sociology (2005).
  - 2005 Choice Magazine Outstanding Academic Title.
- Xie, Yu and Kimberly Goyette. 2004. A Demographic Portrait of Asian Americans. New York: Russell Sage Foundation and Population Reference Bureau.
- Scott, Jacqueline L. and Yu Xie (editors). 2005. Quantitative Social Science, Sage Benchmarks in Social Research Methods. London: Sage.
- Xie, Yu. 2006. Sociological Methodology and Quantitative Research 《社会学方法与定量研究》(in Chinese). Social Sciences Academic Press. Beijing, China. Social Sciences Literature Press.
- Thornton, Arland, William Axinn, and Yu Xie. 2007. Marriage and Cohabitation. Chicago: University of Chicago Press.
  - 2008 Outstanding Publication Award of the Section on Aging and the Life Course of the American Sociological Association.
- Xie, Yu (Editor). 2007. Sociological Methodology Vol. 37. Washington D.C.: American Sociological Association.
- Xie, Yu (Editor). 2008. Sociological Methodology Vol. 38. Washington D.C.: American Sociological Association.
- Xie, Yu (Editor). 2009. Sociological Methodology Vol. 39. Washington D.C.: American Sociological Association.
- Xie, Yu. 2010. Regression Analysis 《回归分析》(in Chinese). Social Sciences Academic Press. Beijing, China. Social Sciences Literature Press.
- Xie, Yu and Alexandra A. Killewald. 2012. Is American Science in Decline? Harvard University Press.
