= Data Sharing for Demographic Research =

Data sharing project

Data Sharing for Demographic Research (DSDR) advances research on maternal and child health and the life course by making data discoverable and accessible for secondary analysis. DSDR is a research data and information repository that adheres to the FAIR (Findable, Accessible, Interoperable, Reusable) principals. DSDR focuses on data with external validity that can be generalized to populations.

The Population Dynamics Branch (PDB) of the Eunice Kennedy Shriver National Institute of Child Health and Human Development (NICHD) funds DSDR. DSDR is located within the ICPSR, the world's largest social science data archive, and is part of the University of Michigan's Institute for Social Research. DSDR provides a platform through which researchers can discover, access, analyze, and preserve data for population studies.

== Description ==
DSDR distributes public-use and restricted-use studies including those with national, international, and small-area geographies; longitudinal panel and repeated cross-sectional designs; genomic data; and biomarkers. DSDR staff provide assistance with public-use and restricted-use data access, data and metadata preparation, and long-term, secure preservation of data.

From the DSDR website, data users can:

- Download public-use data ready for use in a variety of statistical packages.
- Search for studies, variables, and data-related publications.
- Compare variables across studies.
- Analyze data, create new variables, and generate custom subsets online without specialized software.
- View survey instruments and measures used for data collection.
- Explore a catalog of NICHD-funded projects.
- Deposit data for preservation and secondary analysis.
- Access tutorials, videos, and receive technical assistance.
