= Joanne Hsu =

American economist

Joanne W. Hsu
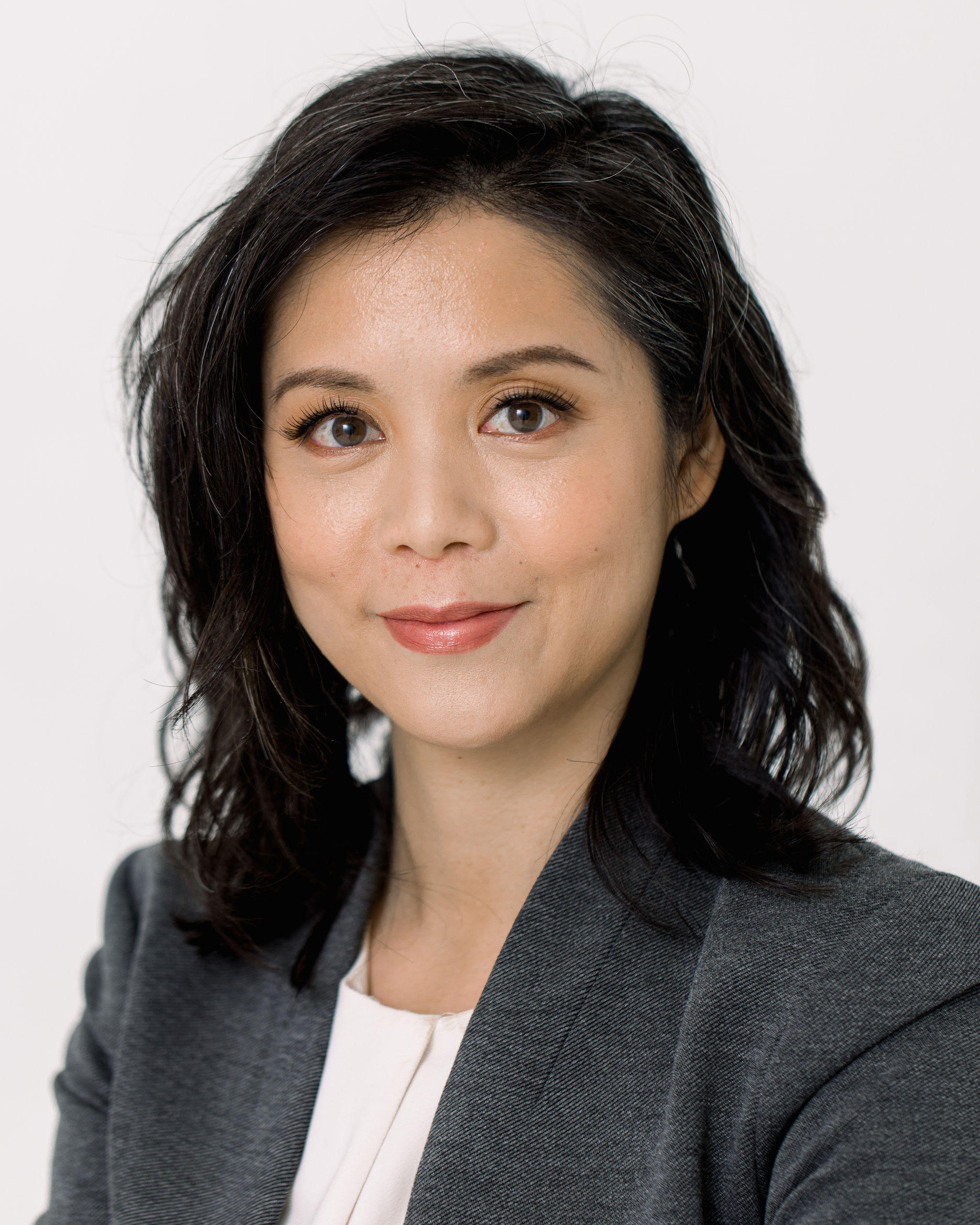

Academic background
- Education: Brown University (AB); University of Michigan (PhD)

Academic work
- Discipline: Consumer economics, Labor economics, Public economics
- Institutions: University of Michigan
- Notable ideas: University of Michigan Consumer Sentiment Index
- Website: www.joannehsu.com

Joanne W. Hsu is an American economist who is director of the University of Michigan Consumer Sentiment Index (MCSI) and a Research Associate Professor at the University of Michigan Institute for Social Research. She specialises in the study of consumer sentiment and oversees the MCSI, one of the most widely followed economic indicators in the United States.

== Education ==
Hsu attended Brown University, where she earned an AB in Economics and International Relations in 2003. She completed her graduate studies at the University of Michigan, receiving an MA in 2006 and a PhD in Economics in 2011.

== Career ==
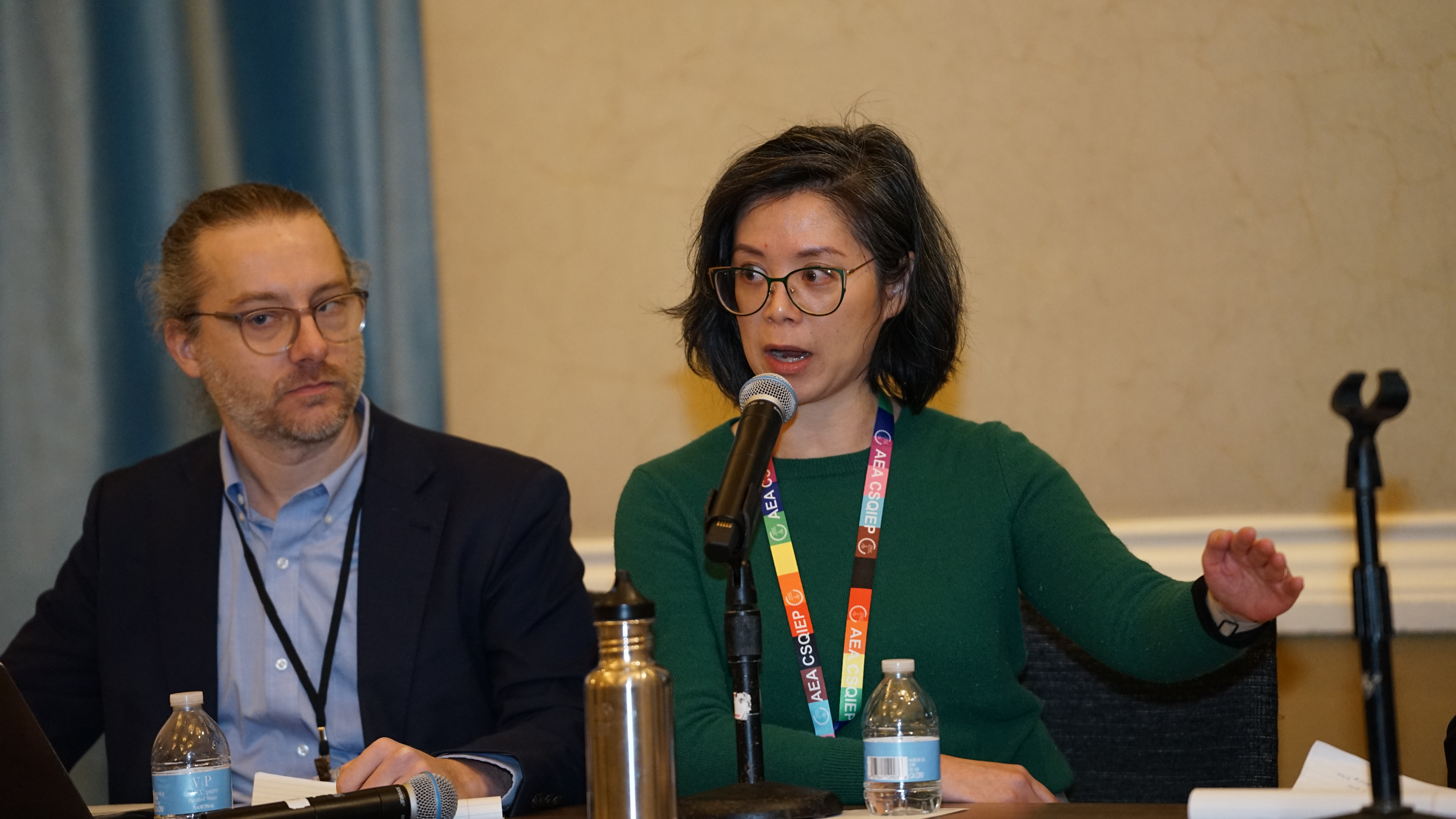
Ben Casselman, Hsu at ASSA 2026 in Philadelphia

Prior to her appointment at the University of Michigan, Hsu spent over a decade at the Federal Reserve Board of Governors. She joined as an economist in 2011 and rose to the position of Principal Economist within the Division of Research and Statistics. Her work at the Federal Reserve focused on the Survey of Consumer Finances and consumption forecasting.

In May 2022, she was appointed Director of the University of Michigan Surveys of Consumers, succeeding Richard Curtin.

Hsu also holds several leadership roles in the economic community. She is the associate chair of the Committee on the Status of Women in the Economics Profession and serves on the Academic Advisory Council for the Federal Reserve Bank of Chicago.

== Research ==
Hsu's research focuses on household finance and the intersection of cognitive health and financial decision-making. She has published extensively on how financial literacy and cognitive decline (specifically Alzheimer's disease) impact the financial well-being of older adults.

== Selected publications ==
- Hsu, Joanne W.; Matsa, David A.; Melzer, Brian T. (2018). "Unemployment Insurance as a Housing Market Stabilizer". American Economic Review. 108 (1): 49–81. doi:10.1257/aer.20140989.
- Dettling, Lisa J.; Hsu, Joanne W. (2021). "Minimum Wages and Consumer Credit: Effects on Access and Borrowing". Review of Financial Studies. 34 (5): 2549–2579. doi:10.1093/rfs/hhaa103.
- Hsu, Joanne W. (2016). "Aging and Strategic Learning: The Impact of Spousal Incentives on Financial Literacy". Journal of Human Resources. 51 (4): 1036–1067. doi:10.3368/jhr.51.4.1110-3881R1.
