= University of Michigan Institute for Social Research =

U.S. research and survey organization

Coordinates: 42.276878°N 83.743488°W

Institute for Social Research
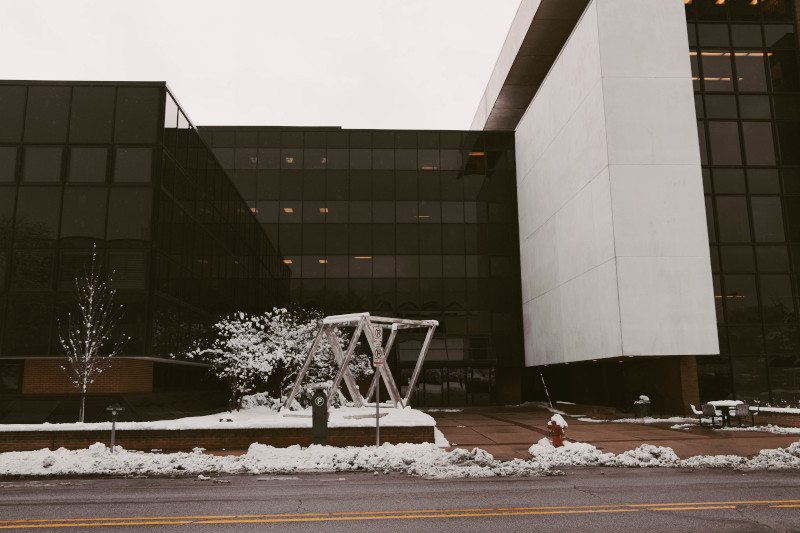
- Institute for Social Research in January 2023
- Parent institution: University of Michigan
- Founders: Rensis Likert, Dorwin Cartwright, et al
- Established: February 1, 1949
- Focus: Social Science Research, Data Accessibility
- Director: Kathleen Cagney
- Budget: $80 million
- Slogan: Social science in the public interest.
- Formerly called: Survey Research Center, Research Center for Group Dynamics
- Address: 426 Thompson St
- Location: Ann Arbor, Michigan
- Website: isr.umich.edu

The Institute for Social Research (ISR) is the largest academic social research and survey organization in the world, established in 1949. The institute is affiliated with the University of Michigan and located in Ann Arbor, Michigan. ISR includes more than 300 scientists from a variety of academic disciplines — including political science, psychology, sociology, economics, demography, history, anthropology, and statistics. The institute is a unit that houses five separate but interdependent centers which conduct research and maintain data archives. In 2021, Kathleen Cagney became the first woman in its history to be named Director of the institute.

In 2026 the Institute was awarded the BBVA Foundation Frontiers of Knowledge Award for 2025 in the category of "Social Sciences".

== History ==
In 1946, the sociologist and economist Rensis Likert, creator of the Likert scale, and six colleagues from his wartime work at the Bureau of Agricultural Economics, including Angus Campbell, Leslie Kish, and George Katona, formed the Survey Research Center (SRC) at the University of Michigan.

The center gained credibility in its field due to a survey conducted in October 1948, when Campbell and Robert L. Kahn added two questions about political leanings to a survey they were conducting for the State Department about foreign policy. Their results, compiled just before the presidential election in November, showed a large number of undecided voters and a small lead for Harry Truman over Thomas Dewey, at odds with most other polls that predicted a landslide for Dewey. When Truman ended up winning the election, the subsequent examination of polling techniques led to the probability sampling utilized by the SRC becoming dominant in the field over the quota sampling that had been favored by other polling outfits. This survey was the first of what became the American National Election Studies (or ANES). In 2010, the ANES was named one of the National Science Foundation’s “Sensational 60” projects.

Psychologist Kurt Lewin had founded the Research Center for Group Dynamics at MIT in 1945, and after his death in 1947 the center's ensuing funding problems prompted its remaining members to find it a new home. The presence of the SRC and the university's support for social sciences led them to move to the University of Michigan in 1948 under a new director, Dorwin Cartwright. The two groups united to form the Institute for Social Research on February 1, 1949.

In 1962, Warren Miller, a political scientist, created the Inter-university Consortium for Political Research (now known as ICPSR) to help fund the maintenance and dissemination of the large data sets that the election studies and others were generating. Publicly available data sets were largely uncommon at the time.

The SRC's Political Behavior Program, which had taken over the direction of election studies, became the Center for Political Studies in 1970. The Population Studies Center moved from the university's College of Literature, Science, and the Arts to ISR in 1998, bringing the total number of centers in ISR to five.

== Organization ==
ISR is an independent unit of the university, headed by a director who reports directly to the university's provost and executive vice president for academic affairs. It is funded through grants from different agencies and foundations, rather than being structured as an independent corporation or receiving funds from the Regents of the University of Michigan. The institute contains five centers and offers academic programming to undergraduate and graduate students in the social sciences.

=== Centers and major projects ===
The Center for Political Studies (CPS) is directed by Kenneth Kollman. CPS has both a domestic and international focus, researching individual political behavior and the role of institutions in contemporary society. Key projects that have emerged from CPS include:

- American National Election Study (ANES)
- Arab Barometer
- Comparative Study of Electoral Systems (CSES)
- World Values Survey (WVS)

The Inter-university Consortium for Political and Social Research (ICPSR), directed by Maggie Levenstein, is the world’s largest digital social science data archive. The unit has over 250,000 files of research in the social sciences, over 750 global member organizations, and hosts 21 special collections. One benefit of using ICPSR’s resources is the ability to search data by variable of interest. All data containing the variable in the search appear, allowing researchers to skim complex datasets without downloading unnecessary files. In 2022, ICPSR announced a partnership with Meta to build and house a social media archive called SOMAR.

The Population Studies Center (PSC), directed by Sarah Burgard, is one of the oldest population centers in the United States. PSC works on domestic and international demographic and population research. It has been funded since 1976 by a population center grant from the Eunice Kennedy Shriver National Institute of Child Health and Human Development.

The Research Center for Group Dynamics (RCGD), directed by Richard Gonzalez, was founded due to the perceived need to integrate psychology, sociology, and cultural anthropology. Key projects that have come from RCGD include:

- Aggression Research Group
- Biosocial Methods Collaborative
- Program for Research on Black Americans

The Survey Research Center (SRC), is the largest of the centers and is the recipient of the majority of the funds used for research at ISR. SRC conducts some of the most widely cited and influential studies in the world, including:

- Army Study To Assess Risk and Resilience in Servicemembers
- Health and Retirement Study
- Monitoring the Future
- National Survey of Family Growth (Cycle 6 and 7)
- Panel Study of Income Dynamics
- University of Michigan Consumer Sentiment Index (also known as Surveys of Consumers)

In 2010, the Panel Study of Income Dynamics was also named as one of NSF’s “sensational 60” projects alongside ANES. In 2019, the Stone Center for Inequality Dynamics was founded in partnership with SRC and the College of Literature, Science, and the Arts.

=== Education and fellowships ===
ISR offers summer courses for undergraduate and graduate students, postdoctoral training, and doctorate and master's degrees in methodology.

The Michigan Program in Survey and Data Science, housed in SRC, offers doctorate and master of science degrees, as well as a certificate through the University of Michigan. SRC also runs the Summer Institute in Survey Research Techniques, which provides graduate-level training courses but does not grant academic credit. ICPSR offers a summer program in quantitative methods, and PSC offers training in demography and population studies for pre- and post-doctoral students.

== Major accomplishments ==
The consumer confidence measures devised by George Katona in the 1940s have evolved into the Consumer Sentiment Index, published monthly. It is included in the Composite Index of Leading Indicators published by the U.S. Department of Commerce Bureau of Economic Analysis.

In 1954 the Survey Research Center fielded the double-blind experimental trials for the Salk polio vaccine, handling the statistical and coding operations of the survey with over 1.8 million IBM punch cards.

The 1964 and 1968 national, cross-sectional surveys of the presidential election led to the creation of the Michigan Model of voter choice theory.

In 1968 scholars within SRC initiated a study investigating the attitudes, experiences, beliefs, and expectations with respect to race relations of both white and Black people in fifteen major American cities. Findings showed that Black Americans wanted both social integration and to retain their Black identity, which directly contradicted the Kerner Commission's suggestion that the "nation is moving toward two societies, one black, one white—separate and unequal."

The National Survey of Black Americans was developed in 1979 by James Jackson and his Program for Research on Black Americans. This was the first nationally representative cross-sectional survey of Black adults in the U.S., and "produced the first national data on how symptoms of distress are defined and responded to by black Americans."

In 2009, the National Football League commissioned a few investigators at ISR to conduct a survey of retired football players. This study was the first to find the connections between football and memory-related diseases like Alzheimer’s, as the research demonstrated the rate of memory-related disease among retired NFL players was 19 times higher than the rate of the general population of men their age.

== Notable scholars ==
- Toni Antonucci
- Angus Campbell
- Dorwin Cartwright
- Philip Converse
- Richard Curtin
- Elizabeth E. Douvan
- William H. Frey
- Patricia Gurin
- Irene Hess
- James S. House
- Vincent Hutchings
- Ronald Inglehart
- James Jackson
- F. Thomas Juster
- Margaret "Maggie" Levenstein
- Roderick J. A. Little
- Robert L. Kahn
- George Katona
- Daniel Katz
- Miles Kimball
- Donald Kinder
- Leslie Kish
- Jon Krosnick
- Rensis Likert
- Arthur Lupia
- Deborah Loewenberg Ball
- Warren Miller
- Jeffrey Morenoff
- James N. Morgan
- Eva Mueller
- Eleanor Singer
- Howard Schuman
- Donald E. Stokes
- Arland Thornton
- Hanes Walton Jr.
- Robert Zajonc
