= Institute for Social Research =

Institute for Social Research may refer to:

- Norwegian Institute for Social Research, a private research institute in Oslo, Norway
- University of Frankfurt Institute for Social Research, a research institute in Frankfurt, Germany
- University of Michigan Institute for Social Research, a research and survey institute in Ann Arbor, Michigan, United States
