= Richard Curtin =

Richard Curtin may refer to:

- Richard Curtin (rower)
- Richard Curtin (economist)
