= University of Michigan Consumer Sentiment Index =

Consumer confidence index

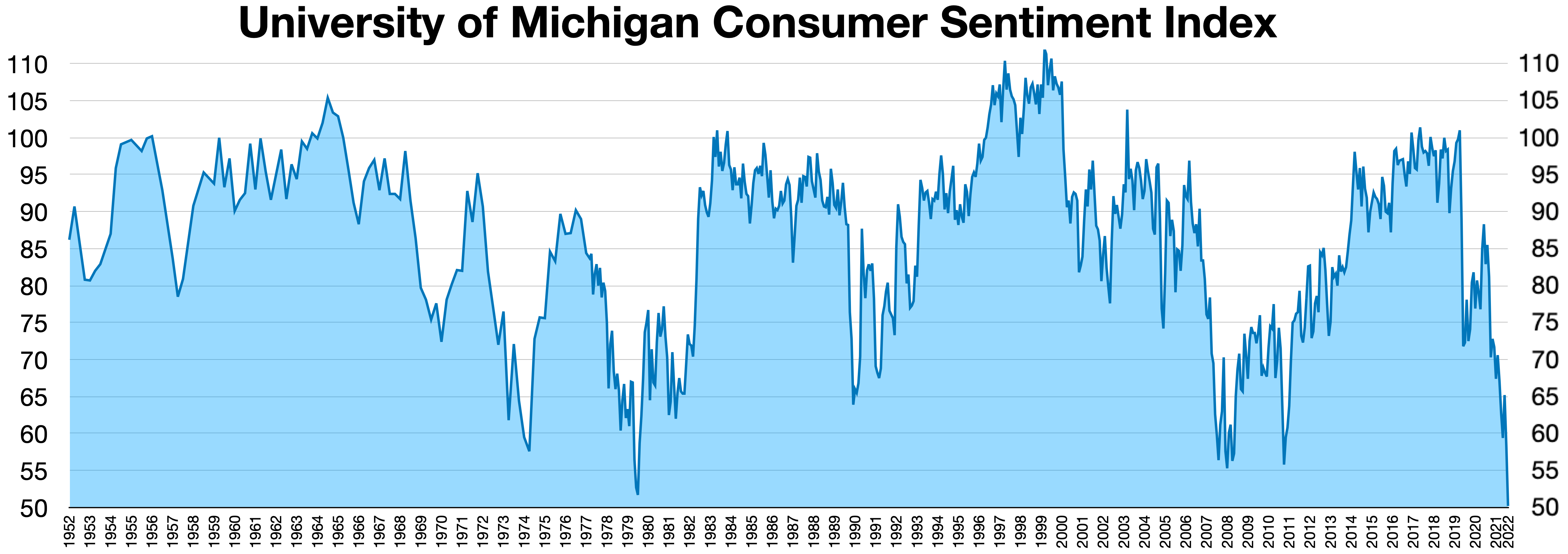
Consumer Sentiment Index 1952 - 2022

The index in more detail as it reaches new lows in 2026

The University of Michigan Consumer Sentiment Index is a consumer confidence index published monthly by the University of Michigan's Institute for Social Research. The index is normalized to have a value of 100 in the first quarter of 1966.

Each monthly survey contains approximately 50 core questions, each of which tracks a different aspect of consumer attitudes and expectations. The samples for the Surveys of Consumers are statistically designed to be representative of all American households, excluding those in Alaska and Hawaii. Currently, households are recruited via postal address based sampling, and about 1,000 interviews are conducted each month via web.

The consumer confidence measures were devised in the late 1940s by Professor George Katona at the University of Michigan. They have now developed into an ongoing, nationally representative survey based on telephonic household interviews. The Index of Consumer Sentiment (ICS) is developed from these interviews. The Index of Consumer Expectations (a sub-index of ICS) is included in the Leading Indicator Composite Index published by the U.S. Department of Commerce, Bureau of Economic Analysis.

Joanne Hsu was named the director and chief economist of the Consumer Sentiment Index in 2022.

== Objectives ==
The Index was created and still is published with the following objectives:

- To assess near-time consumer attitudes on the business climate, personal finance, and spending
- To promote an understanding of, and to forecast changes in, the national economy
- To provide a means of incorporating empirical measures of consumer expectations into models of spending and saving behavior
- To gauge the economic expectations and probable future spending behavior of the consumer
- To judge the consumer's level of optimism or pessimism

== Inputs ==
The Index of Consumer Expectations seeks to find how consumers view three things:

- Their own financial situation
- The short-term general economy
- The long-term general economy

== Implications ==
The Index has implications that can influence the value of the dollar, stocks, and bonds. Thomson Reuters used to be an exclusive distributor of the University of Michigan's survey results.

CNBC reported on June 12, 2013 that the University of Michigan provided Thomson Reuters news service with the data early, so that Reuters could release the CSI to select, paying clients at 9:55 a.m., five minutes before it released the data to the general public on its web site at 10:00 a.m. In addition, Reuters released the data via high speed communication channels to select clients two seconds earlier. CNBC revealed that trading activity increased dramatically within milliseconds of 9:54:58 a.m. Traders who subscribed to either service were able to take advantage of the CSI before the university released it to the public. Former Securities and Exchange Commission Chairman Harvey Pitt opined that this might present a fairness issue and destroy confidence in the market by the public.

Thomson Reuters announced on July 8, 2013 that it was suspending its early release practice as part of an agreement with the New York Attorney General's office.

The University of Michigan stated it received about a million dollars a year from Reuters for this advance information, but said it couldn't do the research without the Reuters payment.

Since January 2015, Index data is available from multiple sources including the university's website, Bloomberg, and Macrobond.

== See also ==
- Consumer Confidence Index
- FRED (Federal Reserve Economic Data)
