= China Family Panel Studies =

Chinese social surveys

China Family Panel Studies (CFPS, Chinese: 中国家庭追踪调查) is a nationally representative, biennial longitudinal (since 2012) general social survey project designed to document changes in Chinese society, economy, population, education, and health. The CFPS was launched in 2010 by the Institute of Social Science Survey (ISSS) of Peking University in Beijing, China. The data were collected at the individual, family, and community levels and are targeted for use in academic research and public policy analysis. CFPS focuses on the economic and non-economic well-being of the Chinese people, and covers topics such as economic activities, educational attainment, family relationships and dynamics, migration, and physical and mental health. The themes cover social, economic, education, health and so forth.

== Datasets ==
Datasets are available on the China Family Panel Studies main website. The Peking University Open Research Data Dataverse mirrors the baseline release under DOI 10.18170/DVN/45LCSO. CFPS data are not redistributed by ICPSR or other third-party archives; access is granted by ISSS through a data-use application.

== Principal investigators ==
- Xie, Yu: Peking University, and Princeton University
- Zhang, Xiaobo: Peking University
- Tu, Ping: Peking University
- Ren, Qiang: Peking University

== Funding ==
This study is funded by:

- National Natural Science Foundation of China
- Peking University

== Scope of the study ==
Subject terms: attitudes, children, cognitive functioning, community development, debt, education, employment, expenditures, family businesses, family life, financial assets, health, household composition, ideologies, income, insurance, land distribution, language, marital status, mental health, migrants, parental attitudes, pensions, public transportation, real estate, retirement, social interaction, time utilization.

Smallest geographic unit: Community

Geographic coverage: People's Republic of China

Time period: 2010—present

Unit of observation: Individual, household, community/village

Universe: Individuals over the age of 9 in households within one of 25 regions in China (excluding Hong Kong, Macao, Taiwan, Xinjiang, Tibet, Qinghai, Inner Mongolia, Ningxia and Hainan), with at least one family member of Chinese nationality.

Data type: Survey data

Language: Chinese; English

Data collector: Institute of Social Science Survey, Peking University

Frequency: Biennially

Dates of collection:

- Start: 2010-04-01 — End: 2010-09-15
- Start: 2012-07-12 — End: 2013-03-04
- Start: 2014-07-04 — End: 2015-06-07
- 2016 wave
- 2018 wave
- 2020 wave — fielded July 2020 to end of 2020
- 2022 wave

Cleaning operations: Consistency checking, wild code checking, text recoding, etc.

Software: At baseline (2010), Blaise 4.8 and SAS 9.1/9.2.

== Methodology ==
Study purpose: To document changes in Chinese society, economy, population, education, and health, so as to provide data for academic research and public policy analysis.

Sample:

CFPS implemented Probability-Proportional-to-Size Sampling (PPS) with implicit stratification. Administrative units and socioeconomic status (SES) are used as the main stratification variables. Within the administrative unit, local GDP per capita was used as the ordering index for SES. If the GDP per capita in the administrative unit is not available, the proportion of nonagricultural population or population density is used alternatively.

The original target sample size was 16,000 households. Half of the sample (8,000) was generated by oversampling with five independent sampling frames (called "large provinces") of Shanghai, Liaoning, Henan, Gansu, and Guangdong. Each of the sub-samples had 1,600 households. The other 8,000 households were from an independent sampling frame composed of 20 provinces (called "small provinces"). The "large provinces" were representative at the regional level, which could contribute to provincial population inferences and cross-region comparisons. With a second-stage sampling, the five "large provinces", together with "small provinces", made up the overall sampling frame representative of the national population. All the sub-sampling frames of CFPS were obtained through three stages: the Primary Sampling Unit (PSU) was administrative districts/counties, the Second-stage 18 Sampling Unit (SSU) was administrative villages/neighborhood communities, and the third-stage (Ultimate) Sampling Unit (TSU) was households. In the first and Second stages, CFPS used official administrative divisions for the sample selection. The third sampling stage is a systematic selection of housing units from street listing with random starting point and equal probability method.

The target sample of CFPS consists of 16,000 households in 25 provinces/municipalities/autonomous regions in China (excluding Hong Kong, Macao, Taiwan, Xinjiang, Tibet, Qinghai, Inner Mongolia, Ningxia and Hainan), representing 95% of the Chinese population. All eligible households and household members are subjects of the survey. An eligible household refers to an independent economic unit that lives in a residential community and one or more family members are of Chinese nationality. Family members are defined as financially dependent immediate relatives, or non-immediate blood/marital/adoptive relatives who have lived with the household for more than three consecutive months and financially related to the sampled household. All members over age 9 in a sampled household are interviewed. These individuals constitute core members of the CFPS and children are also considered core members of the CFPS. Follow-up of all core members of the CFPS is designed to take place on a yearly basis. Five provinces are chosen for initial oversampling (1600 families in each) so that regional comparisons can be made. The remainder of the CFPS sample (8000 families) is drawn from the other provinces so as to make the overall CFPS sample representative of the country through weighting (except for remote areas). The 2010 baseline ultimately interviewed 14,960 households containing 33,600 adults and 8,990 youths (42,590 individuals), against the 16,000-household target. All members of baseline households, together with their future biological and adopted children, are designated "genetic members" and are tracked permanently across waves.

Time method: Longitudinal

Weight: This study provides several weights at the individual, household, and community level that should be used in analysis, including sampling design weights, non-response adjustments weights, and post-hoc stratification adjustment weights.

Collection mode: Face-to-face interview, telephone interview, computer-assisted personal interview (CAPI), computer-assisted telephone interview (CATI), mixed mode.

Actions to minimize losses: Follow-up visits, supervisory checks, historical matching, etc.

Control operations: Strict measures of the quality control were applied in the 2010 CFPS baseline survey to ensure the quality of the data. For the factors that may affect the data quality, such as the improper designs of the questionnaires, inaccurate terminal-stage sampling, irregular behaviors of the interviewers, mistakes in data collection, and compilation processes, we applied different methods of monitoring and intervention, including telephone check, field check, audio record check, interview reviews, statistical analyses, and so on.

Response rates: In 2010, at the household level, the response rate, cooperation rate, contact rate, refusal rate were 81.25%, 96.58%, 84.13%, 2.67%, respectively; at the individual level, the rates were 84.14%, 87.01%, 96.7%, and 8.47%, respectively.

Presence of common scales: K6, CESD20, Big Five Questionnaire for children, HOME Scale, the value of children to parents, Nowicki-Strickland Locus of Control Scale for children, Rosenberge Self Esteem Scale, inter-personal trust from World Value Survey.

== See also ==
- Social Study of Information Systems
- Panel data
