= Irene Hess =

American statistician

Ida Irene Hess (August 27, 1910 – July 5, 2009) was an American statistician who was an expert on survey methodology for scientific surveys and who directed the University of Michigan Institute for Social Research.

== Life ==
Hess was born on August 27, 1910, in Muhlenberg County, Kentucky, the daughter of a Central City mining engineer. After three years of study at Evansville College, she completed her undergraduate studies in mathematics at Indiana University Bloomington, graduating in 1931, and returned home to become a mathematics teacher at a junior high school in Central City.

Beginning in 1940, she used the time in her summers off from teaching to study statistics at the University of Michigan. Although she earned no degree from this study, her work there provided her with enough statistical experience to pass the civil service entrance examination, preparing her for wartime service in the U.S. Bureau of Labor Statistics and the Bureau of Standards, where she helped work on bomb fuses. After the war, she moved again, to the Census Bureau.

She joined the Institute for Social Research in 1954, and later became its director when its founding director, Leslie Kish, stepped down. She faced mandatory retirement at age 70, in 1981, but continued to be active in statistics and in the institute.

In 1977, she became the founding chair of the Section on Survey Research Methods of the American Statistical Association.

She died on July 5, 2009.

== Selected publications ==
Along with many papers with Leslie Kish, Hess is the author or co-author of:

- Probability Sampling of Hospitals and Patients (with Donald C. Reidel, and Thomas Fitzpatrick, 1961)
- Sampling for Social Research Surveys (1995)
- Controlled Selection Continued (with Steven G. Heeringa, 2002)
- The Practice of Survey Research at the Survey Research Center, 1947–1980 (2005)

== Awards and honors ==
Hess became a Fellow of the American Statistical Association in 1972.
