= Pamela Smock =

American sociologist and demographer

Pamela J. Smock
- Born: September 29, 1961 (age 64)
- Education: University of Chicago; University of Wisconsin–Madison
- Known for: Family demography
- Awards: Member of the Sociological Research Association since 2005
- Scientific career
- Fields: Sociology; Demography
- Workplaces: University of Michigan Population Studies Center
- Thesis: The economic costs of marital disruption for young women in the United States: Have they declined over the past two decades? (1992)
- Doctoral advisor: Judith Seltzer

Pamela Jane Smock (born September 29, 1961) is an American sociologist and demographer. She is a research professor in the University of Michigan's Population Studies Center, of which she was the director from 2010 to 2013. She is also a professor of sociology and women's studies at the University of Michigan. She is known for her research on issues related to the family, such as cohabitation, which she has been studying for over two decades.

== Education ==
Smock received her undergraduate degree in sociology from the University of Chicago and was awarded Phi Beta Kappa, Honors in Sociology and Honors in the college. After three years exploring potential career directions, she returned to the University of Chicago for a master's degree in the Social Sciences. The following year, Smock went to the University of Wisconsin-Madison for doctoral studies in sociology and demography, supported by a traineeship from the National Institute of Child Health and Human Development. Her dissertation focused on the economic consequences of divorce for women and whether women's financial situations post-divorce have improved over time.

== Career ==
Smock was an assistant professor at Louisiana State University from 1992 to 1994, when she joined the faculty of the University of Michigan. She was an assistant professor of sociology and women's studies at the University of Michigan, and a research associate at the Population Studies Center there, from 1994 to 2000, when she was promoted to associate professor. Also in 2000, she became a research associate professor at the Population Studies Center. In 2006, she was promoted to the positions of full professor of sociology and women's studies at the University of Michigan and research professor at the Population Studies Center. In 2010, she became the director of the Population Studies Center, a position she held until 2013. She was the second woman to be the head of the center.

== Professional affiliations ==
Smock is a former president of the Association of Population Centers, and a former member of the board of directors of the Population Association of America. She was the editor-in-chief of Demography from 2013 to 2016. She is now a deputy editor for the Journal of Marriage and Family.
