= Canadian Index of Consumer Confidence =

The Canadian Index of Consumer Confidence (ICC) is an indicator designed to measure consumer confidence, which is defined as the degree of optimism on the state of the economy that consumers are expressing through their activities of savings and spending. In Canada consumer confidence is issued monthly by Signal49 Research, an independent research organization, and is based telephone survey of 2,000 households.

== Questions ==
The Index of Consumer Confidence survey is based on four attitudinal questions. Data is collected on each respondent's age, sex, marital status, occupation and geographic location of residence. The four questions are:

1. Considering everything, would you say that your family is better or worse off financially than six months ago?
2. Again, considering everything, do you think that your family will be better off, the same or worse off financially six months from now?
3. How do you feel the job situation and overall employment will be in this community six months from now?
4. Do you think that right now is a good or bad time for the average person to make a major outlay for items such as a home, car or other major item?

== Methodology ==
The percentage of respondents who stated positive and negative opinions is calculated by question for each of the socio-economic and regional classifications as well as for the national aggregate. Positive opinions are beliefs that a consumer's financial situation improved over the past six months or will improve over the next six months, that more jobs will be available over the near term or that it is a good time to make a major purchase. Negative responses are defined as a worsening of a household's financial situation over the previous six months, expectations that the financial position or the number of jobs will worsen over the near term, as well as statements indicating that it is a bad time to make a major purchase.

Each Index of Consumer Confidence is then derived by adding the percentage of positive responses, subtracting the percentage of negative responses, adding a scalar equal to 400 and indexing the resulting series to a base year of 2002. The scalar is introduced to force the value of the Index to zero if all responses are negative.
