= Margaret Levenstein =

American economist

- Education: Columbia University (BA); Yale University (MA, MPhil, PhD)
- Children: 2
- Scientific career
- Fields: Economics
- Institutions: University of Michigan

Margaret C. Levenstein is an American economist who is Director of the Inter-university Consortium for Political and Social Research (ICPSR) and research professor at the Institute for Social Research and the School of Information at the University of Michigan. She is a past president of the Business History Conference. Her research focuses on historical firm organization and competition and the evolution of information systems within firms.

Levenstein received her B.A. from Barnard College in 1983 and Ph.D. from Yale University.

== Selected works ==
- Levenstein, Margaret C., and Valerie Y. Suslow. "What determines cartel success?." Journal of economic literature 44, no. 1 (2006): 43–95.
- Levenstein, Margaret C., and Valerie Y. Suslow. "Breaking up is hard to do: Determinants of cartel duration." The Journal of Law and Economics 54, no. 2 (2011): 455–492.
- Levenstein, Margaret. Accounting for Growth: Information Systems and the Creation of the Large Corporation. Stanford University Press, 1998.
- Evenett, Simon J., Margaret C. Levenstein, and Valerie Y. Suslow. International cartel enforcement: lessons from the 1990s. The World Bank, 2001.
- Levenstein, Margaret C. "Price Wars and the Stability of Collusion: A Study of the Pre‐World War I Bromine Industry." The Journal of Industrial Economics 45, no. 2 (1997): 117–137.
