= Jeffrey Morenoff =

American sociologist

- Born: Jeffrey David Morenoff; March 27, 1966 (age 59)
- Education: University of Chicago (Ph.D., 2000)
- Awards: 2004 Ruth Shonle Cavan Young Scholar Award from the American Society of Criminology
- Scientific career
- Fields: Sociology
- Institutions: University of Michigan
- Thesis: Unraveling paradoxes of public health: neighborhood environments and racial/ethnic differences in birth outcomes (2000)

Jeffrey David Morenoff (born March 27, 1966) is an American sociologist and professor of sociology at the University of Michigan.

He is also a professor of public policy in the Gerald R. Ford School of Public Policy at the University of Michigan, a research professor at the University of Michigan Institute for Social Research, and the director of the Population Studies Center at the University of Michigan. He is known for researching neighborhood environments, social determinants of health, crime, and social inequality.

== Biography ==
Morenoff joined the faculty of the University of Michigan in 1999. He received his Ph.D. from the University of Chicago in 2000. From 2005 to 2010, he was the associate chair of the University of Michigan's Department of Sociology. He became the director of the Population Studies Center at the University of Michigan on July 1, 2013.
