= Monitoring the Future =

American drug use study

The Monitoring the Future (MTF) study, also known as the National High School Senior Survey, is a long-term epidemiological study that surveys trends in legal and illicit drug use among American adolescents and adults as well as personal levels of perceived risk and disapproval for each drug. The survey is conducted by researchers at the University of Michigan's Institute for Social Research, funded by research grants from the National Institute on Drug Abuse, one of the National Institutes of Health.

== Survey design ==
The survey began in 1975 and only focused on that year's senior class. Questionnaires are sent out yearly by mail. Beginning in 1976, a proportion of survey participants were also chosen for biennial reevaluations. In 1991, the survey was expanded to include 8th and 10th grade students. The questionnaire is anonymous for 8th- and 10th-grade students while the questionnaire for 12th-grade students is confidential—name and address information is collected for longitudinal follow-up surveys.

Nationally representative samples of 8th-, 10th-, and 12th-grade students (The 2010 MTF survey encompassed about 46,500 students from almost 400 schools nationwide) receive a questionnaire investigating substance use patterns, attitudes and beliefs about drugs, perceived availability of drugs, and norms among peer and role model groups. Currently, approximately 50,000 8th, 10th and 12th-grade students complete the survey annually.

The survey also evaluates a variety of topics beyond drug use. Questionnaire questions also explore subjects' occupational and educational plans and experiences, attitudes about gender roles, attitudes and experiences with people of a different race/ethnicity, trust in government and other institutions, concerns about the environment, media consumption, victimization and delinquency, among other things. Follow-up studies into adulthood also cover marriage and family formation, college attendance, military service, civilian employment, unemployment, and other topics.

== Regular marijuana and cigarette use by 12th graders ==
Chart below is from a NIDA article. Text at the top was added later. Chart is for regular marijuana and cigarette use by 12th graders in the USA in the past 30 days. For cigarettes actual daily use is measured. For marijuana it is for use on 20 or more occasions in the past 30 days.

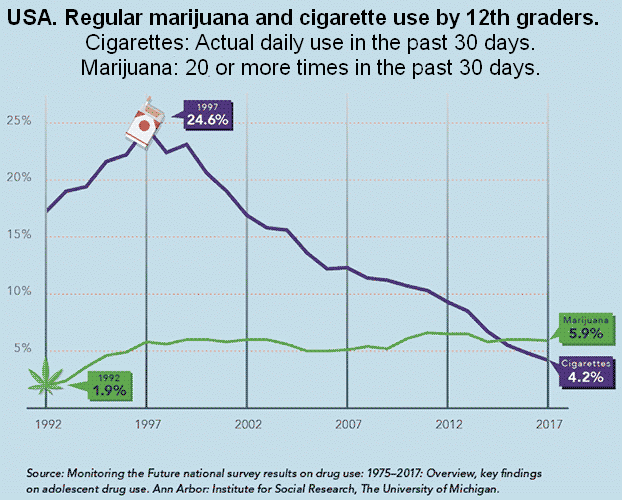
Green line is for marijuana. Dark blue/purple line is for cigarettes.

== See also ==
- Drugs in the United States
