= Wilhelm Ensslin =

German historian and professor (1885–1965)

Wilhelm Enßlin (9 December 1885 – 8 January 1965) was a German ancient historian.
