= Inter-university Consortium for Political and Social Research =

Organization of research institutions

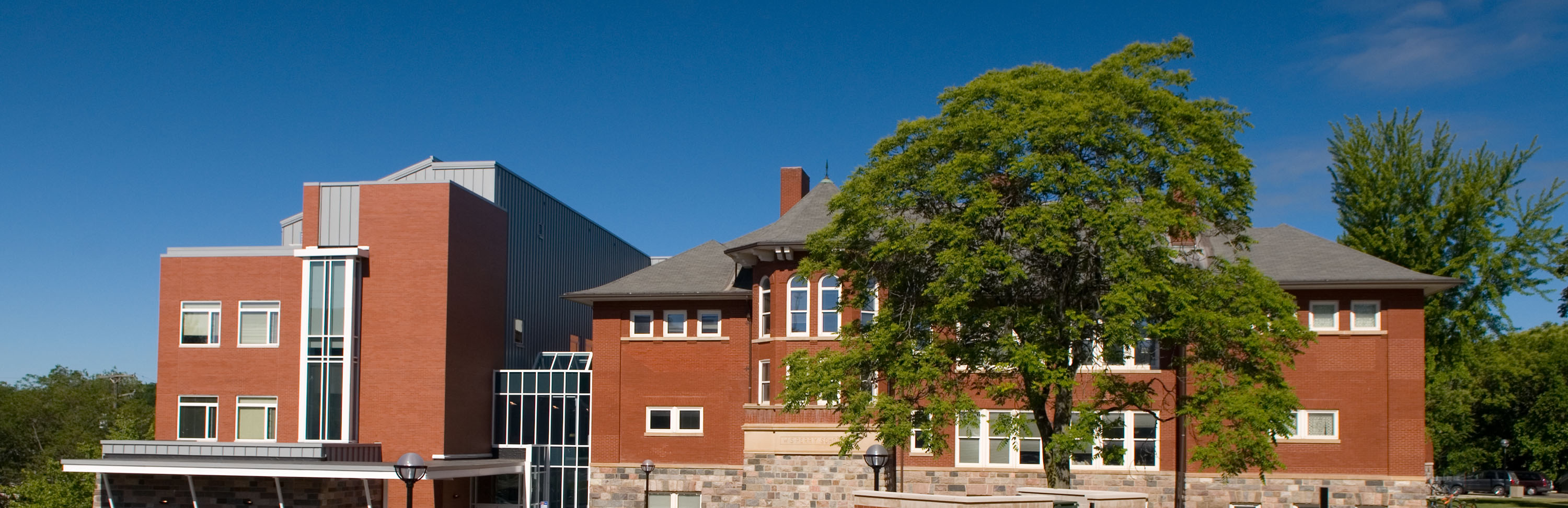
- Headquarters in the Perry Building, University of Michigan campus, Ann Arbor.
- Formation: 1962; 64 years ago
- Location: Ann Arbor, Michigan, U.S.
- Director: Margaret Levenstein
- Parent organization: University of Michigan
- Website: icpsr.umich.edu

The Inter-university Consortium for Political and Social Research (ICPSR) is an American political science and social science research consortium, based at the University of Michigan. It was founded in 1962. An integral part of the infrastructure of social science research, ICPSR maintains and provides access to a vast archive of social science data for research and instruction (over 16,000 discrete studies/surveys with more than 70,000 datasets).

== History ==
=== 1960s ===
The ICPSR was founded by Warren E. Miller as the Inter-university Consortium for Political Research (ICPR). Initially, it was to be an arm of the American National Election Studies, responsible for data dissemination. Miller was also the institute's first director, remaining as such until 1970. In an August 1962 letter to Rensis Likert, Miller justified his creation of the institute with four principles: "institutional rather than individual participation", "continuing rather than episodic relationships", "facilitation of advanced training in research analysis", and "participation in research planning as well as analysis".

The founders of the ICPR pictured it as a cooperative funded by subscriptions, so the organization had three subscription categories. However, by 1963 grants had overtaken subscriptions as the largest source of income, and by 1966 staff were openly discussing the importance of grants. Grants remained the ICPR's largest source of income for the rest of the decade.

=== 1970s ===
Richard I. Hofferbert became the ICPR's director in 1970, followed by historian Jerome Clubb in 1975. County-level election returns for the country from 1788 to 1979 were assembled in computer format for the political offices of Representative, Senator, Governor of each state, and the President.

In 1971, grant funding for the ICPR dropped tremendously, making member fees the largest source of income for the rest of the 1970s.The organization also began to obtain government contracts starting from 1975, which became an increasingly strong revenue source. Also in 1975, they formally added the word "Social" to their name. Clubb would later dub this in a 2011 email as an "expression of reality", noting that it drew attention to the ICPSR "for disciplines and specializations other than political science".

Furthermore, the ICPSR introduced a "federated membership category", where multiple campuses would share one subscription. However, this was complicated and took lots of staff time to administer. By the late 1970s, they had five subscription categories.

=== 1980s and 1990s ===
Membership fees were roughly equal with grants and contracts combined from 1989 to 1994. However, in 1995, grants and contract revenue for the ICPSR began to increase dramatically, staying that way until at least 2002.

In 1994, the ICPSR's board voted to deprecate federated memberships. They would turn down all new federation members, and make fees higher for old ones.

=== 21st century ===
In 2006, the ICPSR served as a test subject for the Trustworthy Repositories Audit and Certification (TRAC). Following this, it also applied for, and received, the more lightweight Data Seal of Approval (DSA) in 2010. (This seal was instituted in 2009 by Data Archiving and Networked Services, itself an institute of both Royal Netherlands Academy of Arts and Sciences and the Netherlands Organization for Scientific Research.)

The institute's first female director, economist Margaret Levenstein, began her role in 2016 for a five-year term, and agreed to serve a second five-year term in 2021. Also in 2021, the institute created a podcast titled "Data Brunch".

== Overview ==
Since 1963, ICPSR has offered training in quantitative methods to facilitate effective data use. The ICPSR Summer Program in Quantitative Methods of Social Research offers a comprehensive curriculum in research design, statistics, data analysis, and methodology. To ensure that data resources are available to future generations of scholars, ICPSR curates and preserves data, migrating them to new storage media and file formats as changes in technology warrant. In addition, ICPSR provides user support to assist researchers in identifying relevant data for analysis and in conducting their research projects.

ICPSR supports students, instructors, researchers, and policy makers who:

- Conduct secondary research to support primary research findings or generate new findings
- Preserve and disseminate primary research data
- Study or teach statistical methods in quantitative analysis
- Write articles, papers, or theses to fulfill undergraduate or graduate requirements
- Develop funding proposals for grants or contracts that require a data management plan

ICPSR provides a number of tools as classroom aids for college-level instructors:

- Bibliography of Data-related Literature – citations to data from published works; a good starting point for literature reviews and research papers
- Social Science Variables Database – lets students learn by comparing variables across datasets
- Survey Documentation and Analysis online analysis package – allows exploration of data directly online
- Crosstab Assignment Builder – lets students create contingency tables from ICSPR data using an instructor-predefined subset of variables
- Data Driven Learning Guides – enhance teaching of core concepts in the social sciences

A unit within the Institute for Social Research at the University of Michigan, ICPSR is a membership-based organization, with over 760 member colleges and universities and other research institutions around the world. A Governing Council of leading scholars and data professionals guides and oversees the activities of ICPSR.

While many of the datasets housed at ICPSR are provided to the public without cost, most require the data user to be a member of an ICPSR member institution or to pay a download fee.

Social media data collected by Meta at the Social Media Archive may be utilized by researchers upon application through the organization.

The ICPSR data archive is listed in the Registry of Research Data Repositories re3data.org.

== ICPSR Summer Program in Quantitative Methods of Social Research ==
The founders of ICPSR believed researchers needed training to use the data the consortium was providing.

The first Summer Program was held in 1963 and was attended by 21 faculty members and 41 graduate students from member institutions. The program offered nine courses, with the most popular class, "Proseminar in Behavior Research Methods", attracting 46 participants.

The Summer Program expanded its offerings and participation over time. In 2015, the ICPSR Summer Program offered 81 courses addressing quantitative and analytic skills taught by 101 instructors from across North America and Europe. Participants included students, faculty, and nonacademic researchers from more than 40 countries, 300 institutions, and 30 disciplines. Due to the COVID-19 pandemic, the ICPSR Summer Program was held entirely online in 2020 and 2021.

== National Archive of Criminal Justice Data ==
The National Archive of Criminal Justice Data (NACJD), established in 1978, is a topical data archive located within the Inter-University Consortium for Political and Social Research (ICPSR), a unit of the Institute for Social Research (ISR) at the University of Michigan. NACJD is sponsored by the Bureau of Justice Statistics, the National Institute of Justice, and the Office of Juvenile Justice and Delinquency Prevention of the United States Department of Justice.

NACJD archives and disseminates digital data on crime and justice for secondary analysis. The archive comprises 2,500 datasets, including approximately 1,500 available for public use. NACJD houses several large-scale and federal crime data series, including:

- FBI's Uniform Crime Reports (UCR)
- FBI's National Incident-Based Reporting System (NIBRS)
- Project on Human Development in Chicago Neighborhoods (PHDCN)
- National Crime Victimization Survey (NCVS)

== See also ==
- National Digital Library Program (NDLP)
- National Digital Information Infrastructure and Preservation Program (NDIIPP)
