= Consumer confidence index =

Economic indicator

A consumer confidence index (CCI) is an economic indicator published by various organizations in several countries.

In simple terms, increased consumer confidence indicates economic growth in which consumers are spending money, indicating higher consumption. Decreasing consumer confidence implies slowing economic growth, and so consumers are likely to decrease their spending. The idea is that the more confident people feel about the economy and their jobs and incomes, the more likely they are to make purchases. Declining consumer confidence is a sign of slowing economic growth and may indicate that the economy is headed into trouble.

== Usage ==
Manufacturers, retailers, banks and the government monitor changes in the CCI in order to factor in the data in their decision-making processes. While index changes of less than 5% are often dismissed as inconsequential, moves of 5% or more often indicate a change in the direction of the economy.

A month-on-month decreasing trend suggests consumers have a negative outlook on their ability to secure and retain good jobs. Thus, manufacturers may expect consumers to avoid retail purchases, particularly large-ticket items that require financing. Manufacturers may pare down inventories to reduce overhead or delay investing in new projects and facilities. Likewise, banks can anticipate a decrease in lending activity, mortgage applications and credit card use. When faced with a down-trending index, the government has a variety of options, such as issuing a tax rebate or taking other fiscal or monetary action to stimulate the economy.

Conversely, a rising trend in consumer confidence indicates improvements in consumer buying patterns. Manufacturers can increase production and hiring. Banks can expect increased demand for credit. Builders can prepare for a rise in home construction, and government can anticipate improved tax revenues based on the increase in consumer spending.

== Consumer-demand surveys versus consumer-confidence and -sentiment surveys ==
Consumer-demand surveys are interview-based statistical surveys that measure the percentage of households that will buy a car, white goods, PCs, TVs, home furnishings, kitchenware, or toys in, for example, the next three-month period. The surveys provide a percentage of those who will purchase more, less, or the same amount of food and clothing in the next three months than in the corresponding period the year before. If you ask people about their purchasing behavior within the coming six or 12 months, there will be more of those who "hope to be able to buy", than if consumers are asked about what they will purchase in the next three months. The shorter the time spans, the closer to actual behavior.

Consumer confidence and sentiment surveys measure how people are doing financially, how they look at the overall economy of the country or business conditions in the country, if they think that the government is doing a good or a poor job and if people think that it is a good or a bad time to buy a car or to buy or sell a house.

When the business cycle is fairly stable, consumer demand surveys and consumer confidence and sentiment indices will often correlate closely and indicate the same direction of the economy, but in times with a high degree of economic or political uncertainty or during a prolonged crisis, the two types of consumer surveys might differ significantly. In 2011, confidence and sentiment surveys went up from March to April, while consumer demand surveys dropped significantly. In August 2011, the confidence and sentiment surveys dropped significantly and stayed low during September and October, while consumer demand surveys showed resilience, a development confirmed later by official statistics.

A 2022 study found that the consumer confidence index always plays a positive and statistically significant function in the development of consumption.

== In Canada ==
The Conference Board of Canada's index of consumer confidence has been ongoing since 1980. It is constructed from responses to four attitudinal questions posed to a random sample of Canadian households. Those surveyed are asked to give their views about their households' current and expected financial positions and the short-term employment outlook. They are also asked to assess whether now is a good or a bad time to make a major purchase, such as a house, car or other big-ticket items.

== In Indonesia ==
Consumer Survey-Bank Indonesia (CS-BI) is a monthly survey that has been conducted since October 1999 by Bank Indonesia. The survey represents the consumer confidence about the overall economic condition, general price level, household income, and consumption plans three and six months ahead. Since January 2007, the survey is conducted with approximately 4,600 household respondents (stratified random sampling) in 18 cities: Jakarta, Bandung, Semarang, Surabaya, Medan, Makassar, Bandar Lampung, Palembang, Banjarmasin, Padang, Pontianak, Samarinda, Manado, Denpasar, Mataram, Pangkal Pinang, Ambon, and Banten. At a significance level of 99%, the survey has a sampling error of 2%. Data canvassing run through interviews by phone and direct visits in particular cities that is based on rotational system. The Balance Score Method (net balance + 100) has been adopted to construct the index, where the index above 100 points indicates optimism (positive responses) and vice versa. The consumer confidence index (CCI), is an average of the current economic condition index (CECI) and consumer expectation index (CEI).

=== Other indexes ===
Danareksa conducts a monthly consumer survey to produce the Consumer Confidence Index.

== In the Republic of Ireland ==
In the Republic of Ireland, KBC Bank Ireland (formerly IIB Bank) and the Economic and Social Research Institute (a think-tank) have published a monthly consumer sentiment index since January 1996.

== In the United States ==
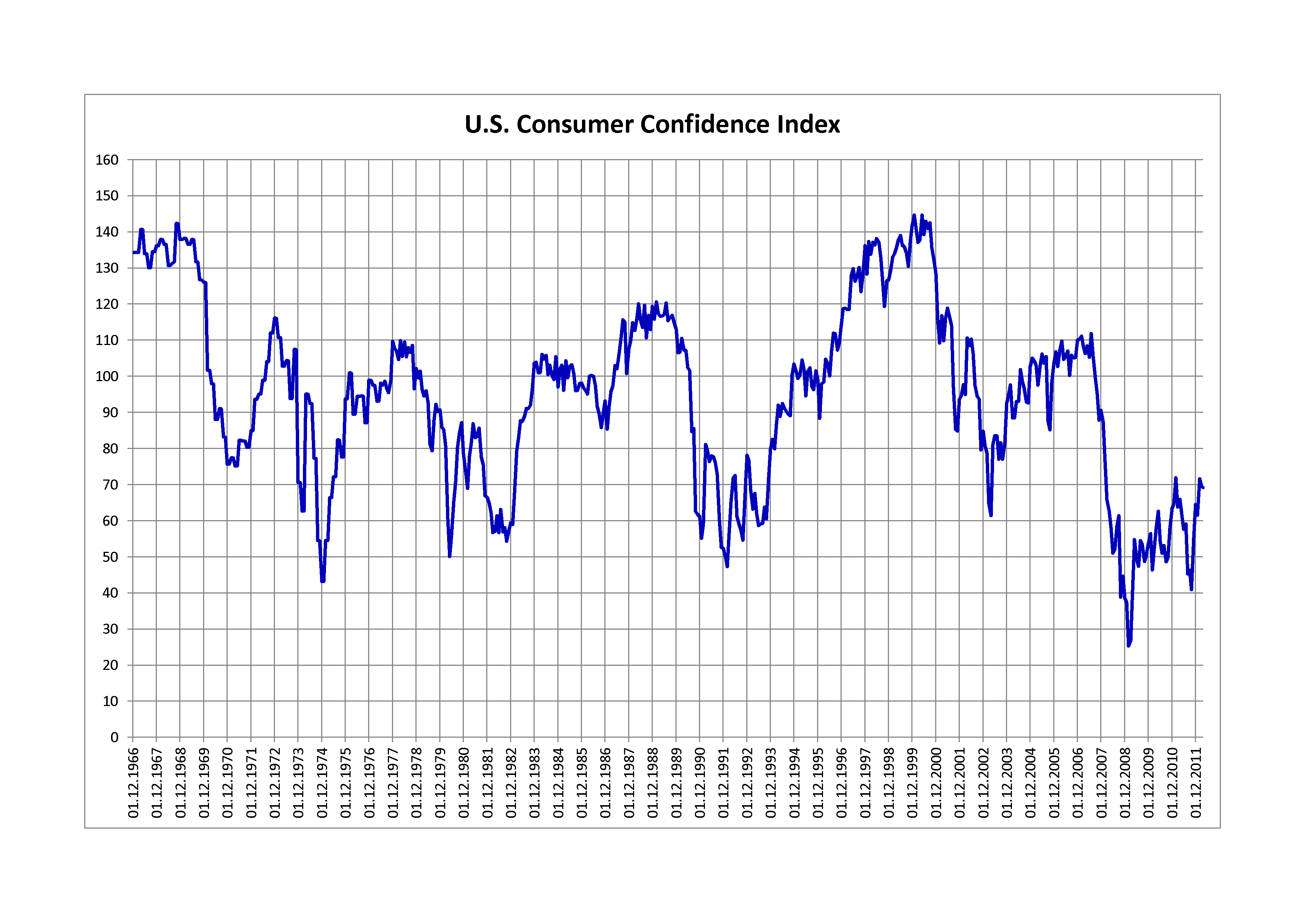
US consumer confidence index 1966–2012

The Conference Board publishes a monthly Consumer Confidence Index based on an online consumer survey conducted for it by Toluna. The index has two components: the Present Situation Index, based on assessments of current business and labor-market conditions, and the Expectations Index, based on short-term expectations for income, business, and labor-market conditions. The series is indexed so that 1985 equals 100. Such measurement is indicative of the consumption component level of the gross domestic product. The Federal Reserve looks at the CCI when determining interest rate changes.

Consumer confidence is defined by The Conference Board as the degree of optimism on the state of the United States economy that consumers are expressing through their activities of savings and spending. Global consumer confidence is not measured. Country-by-country analysis indicates huge variance around the globe. In an interconnected global economy, tracking international consumer confidence is a lead indicator of economic trends.

The consumer confidence index started in 1967 and is benchmarked to 1985 = 100. The index is calculated each month on the basis of a household survey of consumers' opinions on current conditions and future expectations of the economy. Opinions on current conditions make up 40% of the index, with expectations of future conditions comprising the remaining 60%. In the glossary on its website, The Conference Board defines the Consumer Confidence Survey as "a monthly report detailing consumer attitudes and buying intentions, with data available by age, income and region".

The survey consists of five questions that ask the respondents' opinions about the following:

1. Current business conditions
2. Business conditions for the next six months
3. Current employment conditions
4. Employment conditions for the next six months
5. Total family income for the next six months

Survey participants are asked to answer each question as "positive", "negative" or "neutral." The preliminary results from the consumer confidence survey are released on the last Tuesday of each month at 10am EST.

Once the data have been gathered, a proportion known as the "relative value" is calculated for each question separately. Each question's positive responses are divided by the sum of its positive and negative responses. The relative value for each question is then compared against each relative value from 1985. This comparison of the relative values results in an "index value" for each question.

The index values for all five questions are then averaged together to form the consumer confidence index; the average of index values for questions one and three form the present situation index, and the average of index values for questions two, four and five form the expectations index. The data are calculated for the United States as a whole and for each of the country's nine census regions.

In September 2026, the Conference Board's Consumer Confidence Index dropped sharply to 81.9, marking its lowest level in 12 years.

=== Other indexes ===
In addition to the Conference Board's CCI, other survey-based indices attempt to track consumer confidence in the United States:

- The University of Michigan Consumer Sentiment Index (MCSI) is a consumer confidence index published monthly by the University of Michigan. It uses an ongoing, nationally representative survey based on telephonic household interviews to gather information on consumer expectations regarding the overall economy.

Given the potential for sampling biases of individual survey reports, researchers and investors try sometimes to average the values of different index reports into a single aggregated measure of consumer confidence.
