= Social Sciences Academic Press =

Chinese government publishing house

Social Sciences Academic Press 社会科学文献出版社
- Status: Active
- Founded: 1985; 41 years ago
- Headquarters location: Beijing, China
- Owner: Chinese Academy of Social Sciences
- Official website: www.ssapchina.com

Social Sciences Academic Press, abbreviated as SSAP (traditional Chinese: 社會科學文獻出版社; simplified Chinese: 社会科学文献出版社) is an academic publishing organization for humanities and social sciences, directly under the leadership of the Chinese Academy of Social Sciences.

Social Sciences Academic Press was established in 1985, whose notable publications are the "Yearbook series". The scope of its publications mainly includes works on foreign social science theories, world culture, academic trends, academic figures, schools of thought, conferences, research institutions, as well as related literature and various tools.

== See also ==
- China Social Sciences Press
