= George Katona =

American psychologist

George Katona (6 November 1901, Budapest – 18 June 1981, West Berlin) was a Hungarian-born American psychologist considered by some to be a founder of behavioral economics.

He graduated with a doctorate in Experimental Psychology from the University of Göttingen in 1921, and worked both as a journalist and as a psychological researcher in Germany until 1933, when he moved to the US. Originally trained as a Gestalt psychologist working on problems of learning and memory, during the Second World War he became involved in American government attempts to use psychology to combat war-induced inflation. This led him to consider the application of psychological principles to macroeconomics, devising measures of consumer expectations that eventually became the University of Michigan Consumer Sentiment Index. Use of this index enabled him to predict the post-war boom in the United States at a time when conventional econometric indicators were predicting a recession, a success which helped his fledgling index establish itself. Katona wrote numerous books and journal articles advocating the development of economic psychology. These general ideas were taken up more fully in Europe than in the United States until the development, after his death, of modern behavioral economics.

In 1957 he was elected as a Fellow of the American Statistical Association.

== The Psychological Analysis of Economic Behavior ==
Katona developed macroeconomic generalizations and predictions from empirical, microeconomic consumer survey data, rather than theorizing from idealized models or assumptions of perfectly rational participants in an economy. "Unlike pure theorists, we shall not assume at the outset that rational behavior exists or that rational behavior constitutes the topic of economic analysis," he wrote in 1951. Instead, he looked for conditions under which more or less rational behavior was likely to occur. He also sought to tie market forces to an origin in human behavior, sentiment, and decision-making. "Instead of assuming that prices, size of production, amount of purchases, etc., are set for us by impersonal factors, we shall seek to ascertain the forms, conditions, and limits of the human decisions that affect them. The self-regulatory market economy will be considered as a 'limiting case' in which human decisions are least spontaneous."

Katona contrasted "genuine decision" and "habitual behavior".

== Works ==
(This list is currently incomplete.)

BOOKS & MONOGRAPHS,

- Organizing and Memorizing: Studies in the Psychology of Learning and Teaching (Columbia University Press, 1940; republished 1967 by Hafner)
- War without Inflation: The Psychological Approach to Problems of War Economy (Columbia University Press, 1942)
- Price Control and Business (Cowles Commission and Principia Press, 1945)
- Psychological Analysis of Economic Behavior (McGraw-Hill, 1951)
- Business Looks at Banks: A Study of Business Behavior (with Stanley Steinkamp and Albert Lauterbach) (University of Michigan Press, 1957)
- The Powerful Consumer: Psychological Studies in the American Economy (McGraw-Hill, 1960)
- The Mass Consumption Society (McGraw-Hill, 1964)
- Private Pensions and Individual Savings (Institute for Social Research, University of Michigan, 1965)
- Consumer Response to Income Increases (with Eva Mueller) (Brookings Institution, 1968)
- Aspirations and Affluence (with Burkhard Strumpel and Ernest Zahn) (McGraw-Hill, 1971)
- Psychological Economics (Elsevier, 1975)
- A New Economic Era (with Burkhard Strumpel) (1978)

PERIODICAL PUBLICATIONS & BOOK CHAPTERS,

- "Psychological Analysis of Business Decisions and Expectations," American Economic Review, Vol. 36 (1946), 44-63
- "Analysis of Dissaving," American Economic Review, Vol. 39 (1949), 673-888
- "Effect of Income Changes," Review of Economics and Statistics, Vol. 31 (1949), 94-103
- "Rational Behavior and Economic Behavior," Psychological Review, Vol. 60 (1953), 307-318
- "Attitude Change: Instability of Response and Acquisition of Experience," Psychological Monographs, Vol. 72 No. 10 (1958)
- "Repetitiousness and Variability in Consumer Behavior," Human Relations, Vol. 12 (1959), 35-49
- "On the So-Called Wealth Effect," Review of Economics and Statistics, Vol. 43 (1961), 59-60
- "The Wealth of the Wealthy," Review of Economics and Statistics, Vol. 46 (1964), 1-13
- "Consumer Behavior: Theory and Findings on Expectations and Aspirations," American Economic Review, Vol. 58 (1968), 19-30
- "Consumer Durable Spending: Explanations and Prediction," Brookings Papers on Economic Activity, Vol. 1971 No. 1 (January 1971), 234-239
- "The Human Factor in Economic Affairs," in Angus Campell and P. E. Converse, eds., The Human Meaning of Social Change (Russell Sage Foundation, 1972)
- "Psychology and Consumer Economics," Journal of Consumer Research, Vol. 1 No. 1 (June 1974), 1-8
- "Persistence of Belief in Personal-Financial Progress," in Burkhard Strumpel, ed., Human Needs and Economic Wants (Institute for Social Research, University of Michigan, 1975)
- "Toward a Macropsychology," American Psychologist, Vol. 34 No. 2 (1979) 118-126

SURVEY RESEARCH

- Consumer Attitudes and Demand 1950-1952 (with Eva Mueller) (Survey Research Center, University of Michigan, 1953)
- Consumer Expectations 1953-1956 (with Eva Mueller) (Survey Research Center, University of Michigan, 1956)
