= Arland Thornton =

American sociologist (born 1944)

Arland Thornton (born July 18, 1944) is an American sociologist who specializes in the study of marriage and family. He was the director of the Population Studies Center at the University of Michigan from 2004-2008. He received his bachelor's degree from Brigham Young University, and his M.A. and Ph.D. from the University of Michigan.

Thornton specializes in the study of marriage, family, and life course structures and processes. His work currently focuses on intergenerational relations, cohabitation, marriage, divorce, reproductive behavior, living arrangements, and gender roles in Nepal, Taiwan, and the United States.

== Publications ==
Books authored and co-authored by Thornton include:

- International Family Change: Ideational Perspectives. New York: Lawrence Erlbaum. 2008 (with others),
- Marriage and Cohabitation. Chicago: University of Chicago Press. 2007 (with others),
- Reading History Sideways: the Fallacy and Enduring Impact of the Developmental Paradigm on Family Life. Chicago, IL : University of Chicago Press. 2005,
- The Well-Being of Children and Families. Ann Arbor, MI : University of Michigan Press. 2001,
- Ties That Bind: Perspectives on Marriage and Cohabitation. New York: Aldine de Gruyter. 2000 (with others),
- Social Change and the Family in Taiwan. Chicago: University of Chicago Press. 1994 (with Hui-Sheng Lin).

Thornton has published chapters in ten books and published scholarly articles in the American Journal of Sociology, American Sociological Review, Journal of Marriage and Family, American Anthropologist, Ethnology, Human Biology and many others

In 1995 Thornton's book Social Change and the Family in Taiwan received both the William J. Goode Book Award and the Otis Dudley Duncan Award from the American Sociological Association. The former is awarded for the most outstanding contribution to family scholarship in the previous two years. In 2007 his book Reading History Sideways: The Fallacy and Enduring Impact of the Developmental Paradigm on Family Life received the William J. Goode Book Award.
