= Population Studies Center at the University of Michigan =

Demographic center

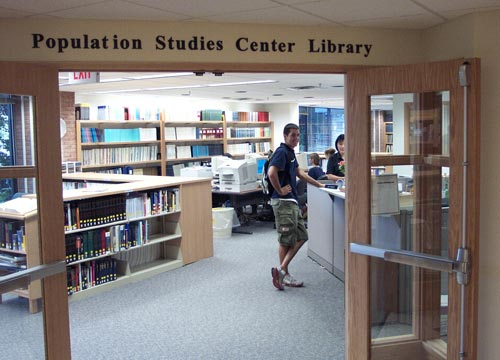
PSC Library Entrance

The Michigan Population Studies Center is a demography center in the United States, with an extensive record in both domestic and international population research and training.

== History and research focus ==
The University of Michigan's Population Studies Center (PSC) was established in 1961, originally as a unit within the Department of Sociology. The Center has had close connections to the Department of Economics since 1966. The Center has become increasingly interdisciplinary over time, drawing faculty from Anthropology, Economics, Geography, Natural Resources, Political Science, Psychology, Public Health, Public Policy, Social Work, Sociology, and Statistics. The energy and intellectual curiosity of the Center's researchers, fostered by the strong support environment and leavened by their interaction with visitors and students at all levels, is a major source of Center momentum.

The PSC comprises independent population researchers who pursue their own agendas with the support of the PSC staff. A large portfolio of both domestic and international research is supported by the Center. The Center focuses on several key areas of demographic research, which can be grouped into several major areas: 1) Families, Fertility & Children; 2) Health, Disability & Mortality; 3) Human Capital, Labor & Wealth; 4) Aging; 5) Population dynamics; 6) Inequality & Group Disparities; 7) Methodology.

== Sample publications ==
Zajacova, Anna, and Sarah Burgard. 2013. "Healthier, Wealthier, and Wiser: A Demonstration of Compositional Changes in Aging Cohorts Due to Selective Mortality." Population Research and Policy Review, 32(3): 311-324.

Bailey, Martha J. 2012. "Reexamining the Impact of Family Planning Programs on US Fertility: Evidence from the War on Poverty and the Early Years of Title X." American Economic Journal: Applied Economics, 4(2): 62-97.

Snow, Rachel C., Massy Mutumba, Gregory Powers, Lindsey Evans, Edith Rukundo, Lenard Abesiga, Joy Kabasindi, Tegan Ford, and Godfrey Mugyenyi. 2011. "The Impact of HIV on Fertility Aspirations in Uganda." PSC Research Report No. 11-740. May 2011

Thornton, Arland, Georgina Binstock, Mohammad Jalal Abbasi-Shavazi, Dirgha Ghimire, Arjan Gjonca, Attila Melegh, Colter Mitchell, Yu Xie, Li-Shou Yang, Linda Young-DeMarco, and Kathryn Yount. 2010. "Knowledge and Beliefs of Ordinary People about Developmental Hierarchies." PSC Research Report No. 10-715. July 2010.

Knodel, John E., Nathalie Williams, Sovan Kiry Kim, Sina Puch, and Chanpen Saengtienchai. 2009. "Community Reaction to Older-Age Parental AIDS Caregivers and Their Families: Evidence from Cambodia." PSC Research Report No. 09-673. February 2009.

== Organization and administration ==
The Center made a major institutional move in July 1998, from the College of Literature, Science, and Arts into the Institute for Social Research (ISR). The merger into ISR facilitates close integration between the PSC's demographic research and the long tradition in survey methodology and major data collection projects at ISR. PSC becomes the fourth center in ISR, joining the Survey Research Center, the Center for Political Studies, and the Research Center for Group Dynamics.

The Center provides administrative and support services to researchers through three core units: Administrative Services, Computing Services, and Information Services., The Administrative Core provides management and administrative support for Research Associates and their funded research projects. The Computing Core provides a state-of-the-art social science computing environment to support the Center's research and training missions. The Information Services Core provides resources and services in three broad areas. Data Services maintains a collection of demographic data files that are routinely used by Center researchers and assists in the acquisition, organization, and management of data for PSC research projects. Library Services maintains a collection of local holdings and assists researchers in collecting information from University libraries and in doing demographic library research using traditional and electronic resources. The Communications Office provides editorial services and disseminates research results through the production of working papers and web sites.

== Graduate and postdoctoral training ==
The Population Studies Center provides apprenticeship training and fellowship support to graduate students in Sociology, Economics, Public Health, and Anthropology who choose demography as a field of specialization. The goal of the graduate training program is to produce social scientists, fully trained in their discipline, with broad knowledge in population studies and specialized skills in statistical and demographic techniques, who can undertake independent research on a wide range of population topics. In the apprenticeship program student trainees gain practical research experience under the supervision of a professional staff member. The Center does not award graduate degrees. All graduate students associated with the Center are admitted into department Ph.D. programs and earn their degrees in those programs. The Center also provides postdoctoral training to demographic researchers in a variety of fields.

== PSC Financial Support ==
The PSC was established with funding from the Ford Foundation, and received continued support from the Ford Foundation for over 20 years. Since 1976 the Center has been supported by a population center grant (R24 HD041028) from the National Institute of Child Health and Human Development (NICHD), part of the National Institutes of Health. This center grant provides core infrastructure support for the Center's research activities. NICHD center grant support continues to be the major source of funding for the Center's cores. The Center also collaborates with the Survey Research Center of ISR in operating the Michigan Center on the Demography of Aging (MiCDA), funded by the National Institute on Aging (NIA), also part of the National Institutes of Health. Additional support for PSC's international research and training activities is provided by grants from the Andrew W. Mellon Foundation and the William and Flora Hewlett Foundation.

== Center Directors ==
Sarah Burgard, 2020–

Jeffrey Morenoff, 2013–2020

Pamela Smock, 2010–13

David Lam, 2008–2010

Arland Thornton, 2004–2008

David Lam, 1994–2003

Babara Anderson, 1991–94

William M. Mason, 1988–90

Albert Hermalin, 1977–87

David Goldberg, 1972–76

Ronald Freedman, 1962–71
