= Consumer confidence =

Economic indicator

Consumer confidence is an economic indicator that measures the degree of optimism that consumers feel about the overall state of the economy and their personal financial situation. If the consumer has confidence in the immediate and near future economy and their personal finance, then the consumer will spend more than save.

When consumer confidence is high, consumers make more purchases. When confidence is low, consumers tend to save more and spend less. A month-to-month trend in consumer confidence reflects the outlook of consumers with respect to their ability to find and retain good jobs according to their perception of the current state of the economy and their personal financial situation.

Consumer confidence typically increases when the economy expands, and decreases when the economy contracts. In the United States, there is evidence that the measure is a lagging indicator of stock market performance.

== Usage ==
Investors, manufacturers, retailers, banks, public opinion researchers and government agencies use various assessments of consumer confidence in planning their actions. The ability to predict major changes in consumer confidence allows businesses to gauge the willingness of consumers to make new purchases. As a result, businesses can adjust their operations and the government can prepare for changing tax revenue. If confidence is dropping and consumers are expected to reduce their spending, most producers will tend to reduce their production volumes accordingly. For example, if manufacturers anticipate consumers will reduce retail purchases, especially for expensive and durable goods, they will cut down their inventories in advance and may delay investing in new projects and facilities. Similarly, if banks expect consumers to decrease their spending, they will prepare for the reduction in lending activities, such as mortgage applications and credit card use. Builders will plan for the decline in home construction volumes. The government will get ready for the reduction in future tax revenues. On the other hand, if consumer confidence is improving, people are expected to increase their purchases of goods and services. In anticipation of that change, manufacturers can boost production and inventories. Large employers can increase hiring rates. Builders can prepare for higher housing construction rates. Banks can plan for a rise in demand for credit products. Government can expect improved tax revenues based on the increase in consumer spending.

=== Conference Board, Present Situation Index and the Business Cycles ===
Major drops in the Present Situation Index tend to precede a drop in the business cycle. The economy enters a recession after the Conference Board, Present Situation Index drops by 15 points from its prior year's value.,

== Consumer confidence by country ==
=== Canada ===
The Conference Board of Canada's Index of Consumer Confidence has been ongoing since 1980. It is constructed from responses to four attitudinal questions posed to a random sample of Canadian households. Those surveyed are asked to give their views about their households' current and expected financial positions and the short-term employment outlook. They are also asked to assess whether now is a good or a bad time to make a major purchase such as a house, car or other big-ticket items.

=== India ===
The relevance of a consumer confidence index for a country like India is evident from the fact that Consumption Expenditure accounts for over 60% of India's GDP. The BluFin Consumer Confidence Index is the first monthly, statistically robust index of consumer sentiment in India. The CCI is designed to provide reliable insights into the direction of the Indian national and regional economies. Released once a month, the index is computed from the results of a monthly survey of 4,000 consumers in 18 cities across India. The Zyfin (formerly known as BluFin) Consumer Confidence Index was developed by a team of financial economists and statisticians led by Dr. Sam Thomas, Ph.D., Director of Research and Development at BluFin. Dr Thomas is also Professor of Banking and Finance at the Weatherhead School of Management, Case Western Reserve University, Cleveland, Ohio.

=== Israel ===
The Israeli consumer confidence index is conducted by Israel's daily Globes and is published monthly by Globes's research unit.

=== Spain ===
The Spanish CCI is made since 2004. The Instituto de Crédito Oficial (ICO) based its calculation on the methodology of Michigan and the USA Conference Board. Since November 2011 is the Centro De Investigaciones Sociológicas (CIS) who is responsible for its publication.

The CCI is built up from a monthly survey of opinion with implementing standardized telephone questionnaire to a representative sample of the population resident in Spain of 1000 individuals over 16 years. The sampling procedure is multistage, with selection of primary sampling units (municipalities) in a random proportional to each of the Spanish provinces and the secondary units (households) from telephone numbers and the last units (individuals) as cross-gender quotas and age.

=== United States ===
There exist several indicators that attempt to track and measure consumer confidence in the US:

==== Consumer Confidence Index ====
The Consumer Confidence Index (CCI) is produced by the non-profit business group The Conference Board since 1967. The CCI is designed to assess the overall confidence, relative financial health and spending power of the US average consumer. The Conference Board releases the headline Consumer Confidence Index figure each month, alongside a Present Situation Index and an Expectations Index.

Methodology

The CCI is based on the data from a monthly survey of 5,000 US households. The data is calculated for the United States as a whole and for each of the country's nine census regions. The survey consists of five questions on the following topics: i) current business conditions, ii) business conditions for the next six months, iii) current employment conditions, iv) employment conditions for the next six months, v) total family income for the next six months. Opinion on current conditions make up to 40% of the index and expectation about future as 60%, thus making it a "Leading Indicator". After all surveys are collected, each question's positive responses are divided by the sum of its positive and negative responses. The resulting relative value is then used as an "index value" and compared against each respective monthly value for 1985. In that year, the result of the index was arbitrarily set at 100, representing it as index benchmark. That year was chosen as a benchmark year because it was neither a peak nor trough in the business cycle. The index values for all five questions are averaged together to produce the CCI.

The Present Situation Index is based on answers to questions about the respondent's assessment of

- their current business situation
- the current employment conditions

The Expectations Index is based on responses to questions about respondents expectations for six months in the future of:

- business conditions
- the job expectations
- total household income

==== University of Michigan Consumer Sentiment Index ====
The University of Michigan Consumer Sentiment Index (MCSI) is produced by the University of Michigan and distributed by Thomson Reuters. The MCSI is designed to gauge consumer attitudes toward the overall business climate, the state of personal finances, and consumer spending. The University of Michigan releases three related figures each month: the Index of Consumer Sentiment (ICS, or MCSI), the Index of Current Economic Conditions (ICC), and the Index of Consumer Expectations (ICE). The most recent data for ICS is published by Reuters here. The Index of Consumer Expectations is an official component of the U.S. Index of Leading Economic Indicators.

On June 12, 2013, the CNBC reported that Thomson Reuters allows fee-paying customers access to the Index before it is available to others.

Methodology of the MCSI

The Index of Consumer Sentiment (ICS) is based on the monthly telephone survey of the US household data. The Index is aggregated from five questions on the following topics: i) personal financial situation now and a year ago, ii) personal financial situation one year from now, iii) overall financial condition of the business for the next twelve months, iv) overall financial condition of the business for the next five years, v) current attitude toward buying major household items. The ICS is calculated from computing the "relative scores" for each of the five index questions: the percent giving favorable replies minus the percent giving unfavorable replies, plus 100. Each relative score is then rounded to the nearest whole number. All five relative scores are then summed and the sum is divided by 6.7558 (the 1966 base period) and 2 is added to the result (a constant to correct for sample design changes from the 1950s). ICC is calculated by dividing the sum of the rounded "relative scores" of the questions one and five by 2.6424 and adding 2. ICE is calculated by dividing the sum of the rounded "relative scores" of the questions two, three, and four by 4.1134 and adding 2.

==== Bloomberg Consumer Comfort Index ====
The Bloomberg Consumer Comfort Index represents a four-week rolling average based on 250 telephone interviews a week with adults nationwide, giving a sample size of 1,000 for each four-week period. The survey began in December 1985 by the polling firm Langer Research Associates and was originally known as "The ABC News Consumer Comfort Index" before Bloomberg licensed the rights in 2011. The Index is based on consumers' ratings of the economy, the buying climate, and personal finances. Unlike the other indicators, it measures only current conditions with no questions about expectations.

Methodology of the Consumer Comfort Index

The Index aggregates consumer responses to three questions on the following topics: i) national economy ("would you describe the state of the nation's economy these days as excellent, good, not so good, or poor?", ii) on personal finances ("would you describe the state of your own personal finances these days as excellent, good, not so good, or poor?") and iii) buying climate ("considering the cost of things today and your own personal finances, would you say now is an excellent time, a good time, a not so good time, or a poor time to buy the things you want and need?"). The Index is derived by subtracting the negative response to each question from the positive response to that question. The three resulting numbers are then added and divided by three. The index can range from +100 (everyone positive on all three measures) to -100 (all negative on all three measures).

==== Consumer Confidence Average Index ====
The Consumer Confidence Average Index (CCAI) is a monthly indicator that aggregates data from the above three major national polls on consumer confidence. It represents the rescaled average of the Conference Board Consumer Confidence Index, the University of Michigan Consumer Sentiment Index, and the Bloomberg Consumer Comfort Index.

Methodology of the CCAI

The CCAI takes into account historical values of all three indexes starting from December 1985. The value 0 of the Consumer Confidence Average represents the lowest value of each index. The value 100 of the Consumer Confidence Average represents the highest value of each index.

==== Gallup Economic Confidence Index ====
The Gallup Economic Confidence Index is a broad indicator of Americans’ confidence in national economic conditions, based on the combined responses to two questions. One question asks Americans to evaluate current economic conditions; the other measures their perceptions of whether the economy is getting better or getting worse. Gallup has asked the component questions periodically since 1992, monthly since October 2000, and daily since January 2008. Gallup reports results of the Economic Confidence Index on Gallup.com on a daily, weekly, monthly, and quarterly basis.

Methodology of the ECI

Gallup’s Economic Confidence Index is a composite of the two questions that Gallup asks daily of a nationally representative sample of 500 adults, aged 18 and older, and reports weekly based on approximately 3,500 interviews. The first question asks Americans to rate economic conditions in the country today, and second question asks whether they think economic conditions in the country as a whole are getting better or getting worse. The two questions have equal weight in the index, which is reported without revisions or seasonal adjustments. They can also be analyzed separately, providing insight into changes in the overall index. The survey is conducted with respondents contacted on landlines and cellphones, and includes Spanish-language interviewing. Gallup calculates the Economic Confidence Index by adding the percentage of people rating current economic conditions (["excellent" + "good"] minus "poor") to the percentage saying the economy is ("getting better" minus "getting worse"), and then dividing that sum by two. The Gallup Economic Confidence Index has a possible maximum of +100 (reached if all Americans rate current economic conditions as excellent or good, and all Americans say the economy is getting better) and a possible minimum of -100 (reached if all rate the current economy as poor, and say the economy is getting worse).

== Worldwide ==
Prior to 2009, there had been no systematic attempt to track and measure consumer confidence around the world. In 2009 and 2012, Gallup collected global economic confidence data through its Gallup World Poll, and analyzed the data from 108 countries surveyed in both years. Gallup's Economic Confidence Index is based on the combined responses to two questions: the first asking individuals to rate economic conditions in their country today, and the second, whether they think economic conditions in the country as a whole are getting better or getting worse.

=== Nielsen Global Consumer Confidence ===
The Nielsen Global Consumer Confidence Index measures the confidence, major concerns and spending habits of online consumers in 54 countries on the half-annual basis. The Index is developed based on consumers' confidence in the job market, status of their personal finances and readiness to spend. It is produced by the Nielsen Company (Nielsen Customized Research) from its Nielsen Global Online Consumer Survey. In April 2008 the survey answers included responses from 28,153 online users.

In the first quarter 2015, three of the best countries are India (130), Indonesia (123), and Philippines (115) among 60 countries surveyed, while three of the worst countries are Ukraine (41), South Korea (46), and Serbia (53).

== GfK Consumer Confidence Barometer (UK) ==
The GfK Consumer Confidence Barometer has now been running in the same format across Europe since the early 1970s. GfK have been conducting the Consumer Confidence Barometer in the UK since June 1995. The survey is carried out on a monthly basis on behalf of the European Commission, who sponsor the same research in all European Union member countries. The main aim of this research is to monitor the general public's confidence in the British economy. Each month the survey tracks changes in personal finance, general economic situation, inflation, unemployment, current purchasing climate, consumer spending and saving. Quarterly research tracks car purchasing, home purchasing and home improvements.

== See also ==
- Trust (economics)
