= Richard Curtin (economist) =

American economist, academic and researcher

Richard T. Curtin
- Born: April 4, 1945 (age 81)
- Occupations: Economist, academic and researcher

Academic background
- Education: Ph.D., Economics
- Alma mater: University of Michigan
- Thesis: Income Equity among U.S. Workers: The Basis and Consequences of Deprivation (1975)

Academic work
- Institutions: University of Michigan

Richard T. Curtin is an American economist, academic and researcher. He is a Research Professor and has been the Director of Consumer Sentiment Surveys at University of Michigan since 1976.

Curtin has conducted research on the formation of expectations and the way economic expectations influence trends in the macro economy. His research is centered on the advancement of behavioral macroeconomics.

== Career ==
After completing his doctoral studies from University of Michigan in 1975, Curtin started at the University of Michigan as an Assistant Research Scientist and was later - promoted to Associate Research Professor, and then to Research Professor.

Curtin is a member of Board of Directors of Journal of Behavioral Economics for Policy. He is a former co-editor of Journal of Economic Psychology.

== Research ==
=== Consumer sentiment surveys ===
Curtin has directed the University of Michigan's consumer sentiment surveys since 1976. The surveys are focused on innovation regarding the conceptualization, measurement, and selection of important economic topics, along with the data analysis.

The sentiment surveys have been replicated by over six dozen countries, including the countries for which Curtin helped to establish or improve the consumer surveys.

=== Formation of expectations ===
Curtin advanced an interdisciplinary theory on the formation of expectations that reconciles the economist's rational expectations hypothesis and the psychologist's bounded rationality theory. Curtin found that expectations are formed naturally and automatically by everyone and that evolutionary development has provided people with an efficient means to form expectations by using their full mental faculties, including their conscious and nonconscious cognitive abilities, their emotional resources, and through social interactions. The primary evolutionary purpose of expectations is to enable the efficient use of conscious deliberation. According to him, expectations help to decide how each new piece of information is handled. Rather than based on national statistics, consumers predominantly use private information based on their daily interactions with the economy and other people. Whereas traditional theory holds that expectations are formed independent of their use in decisions, Curtin's new theory holds that expectations are context sensitive, and vary by how sensitive the decision is the accuracy of an expectation.

=== Impact on macroeconomy ===
Curtin also conducted research regarding macroeconomy. Conventional theory holds that the consumer plays no independent role in whether the recession or growth of the economy. Orthodox theory holds that the consumer cannot directly cause recessions since consumer behavior is completely determined by other economic factors, such as wages, prices, interest rates, and the like. According to Curtin, economics have ignored the fact that consumers have generally invested as much or more than business in new plants (houses) and equipment (vehicles, durables, etc.) to improve output (living standards). He found that consumer investments accounted for 12.2% of GDP from 1930 to 2019 compared with 11.2% among business firms over the same period. His study also indicated that changes in consumer spending generally occurred before changes in business investments. Curtin has argued that it is much more likely that it is prospects for consumer demand that motivates firms to invest and produce, and that this line of causation is more consistent with economic theory.

=== Entrepreneurship ===
Curtin, along with Paul Reynolds, designed the Panel Study of Entrepreneurial Dynamics research program focused on understanding the process of business formation. Curtin and Reynolds selected samples of nascent entrepreneurs and interviewed them on an annual basis to provide annual updates of their efforts to start new businesses.

== Bibliography ==
=== Books ===
- Surveys of Consumers 1974-75: Contributions to Behavioral Economics (1976)
- Income Equity Among U.S. Workers: The Basis and Consequences of Deprivation (1977)
- Trends in Entrepreneurship (2008)
- Business Creation in the United States: Panel Study of Entrepreneurial Dynamics II Initial Assessment (2008)
- New Firm Creation in the United States (2009)
- New Business Creation: An International Overview, International Studies in Entrepreneurship (2011)
- Consumer Expectations: Micro Foundations and Macro Impact (2019)

=== Selected articles and book chapters ===
- Curtin, Richard, Consumer Expectations: A New Paradigm in Business Economics, 54:199-210, November, 2019
- Curtin, Richard, George Katona: A Founder of Behavioral Economic in Routledge Handbook of Behavioral Economics, Roger Frantz, et al. (editors), Routledge Press: London, 2017.
- Curtin, Richard, Inflation Expectations: Theoretical Models and Empirical Tests, in Inflation Expectations, Peter Sinclair (editor), Routledge International Studies in Money and Banking: London, 2010.
- Curtin, Richard, Consumer Sentiment Surveys: Worldwide Review and Assessment, Journal of Business Cycle Measurement and Analysis, 4:2, 2007.
- Curtin, Richard, Unemployment Expectations: The Impact of Private Information on Income Uncertainty, Review of Income and Wealth, 49:4, 2003.
