= Tali Mendelberg =

- Born: 1964 (age 61–62)
- Education: University of Michigan
- Known for: The Race Card: Campaign Strategy, Implicit Messages, and the Norm of Equality (book)
- Awards: 2002 Woodrow Wilson Foundation Book Award
- Scientific career
- Fields: Political science
- Workplaces: Princeton University
- Doctoral students: Shana Kushner Gadarian

Tali Mendelberg (born 1964) is the John Work Garrett Professor in Politics at Princeton University, co-director of the Center for the Study of Democratic Politics, and director of the Program on Inequality at the Mamdouha S. Bobst Center for Peace and Justice, and winner of the American Political Science Association (APSA), 2002 Woodrow Wilson Foundation Book Award for her book, The Race Card: Campaign Strategy, Implicit Messages, and the Norm of Equality.

== Education ==
Mendelberg gained her degree from the University of Wisconsin in 1985, and her PhD in political science from the University of Michigan in 1994.

== Awards and honors ==
- 2002 Woodrow Wilson Foundation Book Award from (APSA)
- 2014 Paul Lazarsfeld Best Paper Award: Political Communication Section from APSA
- 2012 Best Paper Award: Political Psychology Section from APSA (with Christopher Karpowitz)
- 2014 Best Paper Award: Political Psychology Section from APSA
- Member of the American Academy of Arts and Sciences, elected 2018

== Bibliography ==
=== Gender and deliberation ===
- Mendelberg, Tali; Karpowitz, Christopher F. (2007), "How people deliberate about justice: groups, gender and decision rules", in Rosenberg, Shawn W. (ed.), Deliberation, participation and democracy: can the people govern, Basingstoke England New York: Palgrave Macmillan, pp. 101–129, ISBN 978-0-230-51735-6.
- Mendelberg, Tali; Karpowitz, Christopher F.; Shaker, Lee (August 2012). "Gender inequality in deliberative participation". American Political Science Review. 106 (3): 533–547. doi:10.1017/S0003055412000329. S2CID 26714987. Pdf.
- Mendelberg, Tali; Karpowitz, Christopher F. (8 November 2012). "The opinion pages: More women, but not nearly enough". The New York Times.
- Mendelberg, Tali; Karpowitz, Christopher F. (2014), The silent sex: gender, deliberation, and institutions, Princeton, New Jersey: Princeton University Press, ISBN 978-0-691-15976-8
- Mendelberg, Tali; Karpowitz, Christopher F.; Oliphant, J. Baxter (March 2014). "Gender inequality in deliberation: unpacking the black box of interaction". Perspectives on Politics. 12 (1): 18–44. doi:10.1017/S1537592713003691. S2CID 56166800. Pdf.
- Mendelberg, Tali; Karpowitz, Christopher F.; Goedert, Nicholas (April 2014). "Does descriptive representation facilitate women's distinctive voice? How gender composition and decision rules affect deliberation". American Journal of Political Science. 58 (2): 291–306. doi:10.1111/ajps.12077. Pdf.
- Mendelberg, Tali; Karpowitz, Christopher F.; Mattioli, Lauren (January 2015). "How group forces demonstrate the malleability of gendered behavior". Politics, Groups, and Identities. 3 (1): 203–208. doi:10.1080/21565503.2014.999808. S2CID 34866377. Pdf.
- Mendelberg, Tali; Karpowitz, Christopher F.; Mattioli, Lauren (January 2015). "Why women's numbers elevate women's influence, and when they do not: rules, norms, and authority in political discussion". Politics, Groups, and Identities. 3 (1): 149–177. doi:10.1080/21565503.2014.999804. S2CID 144320596. Pdf.

=== Deliberative politics ===
- Mendelberg, Tali; Oleske, John (April 2000). "Race and public deliberation". Political Communication. 17 (2): 169–191. doi:10.1080/105846000198468. S2CID 39737712. Pdf.
- Mendelberg, Tali; Karpowitz, Christopher F. (2011), "An experimental approach to citizen deliberation", in Druckman, James N.; Green, Donald P.; Kuklinski, James H.; Lupia, Arthur (eds.), Cambridge Handbook of Experimental Political Science, Cambridge New York: Cambridge University Press, pp. 258–272, ISBN 978-0-521-17455-8.
- Mendelberg, Tali (2002), "The deliberative citizen: theory and evidence", in Carpini, Michael X. Delli; Huddy, Leonie; Shapiro, Robert Y. (eds.), Political decision-making, deliberation and participation, Research in Micropolitics: Volume 6, Amsterdam Boston: Emerald Group Publishing, pp. 151–194, ISBN 978-0-7623-0227-7. Pdf.
- Mendelberg, Tali; Karpowitz, Christopher F. (Winter 2007). "Groups and deliberation". Swiss Political Science Review. 13 (4): 645–662. doi:10.1002/j.1662-6370.2007.tb00092.x.
- Mendelberg, Tali; Karpowitz, Christopher F. (2011), "An experimental approach to citizen deliberation", in Druckman, James N.; Green, Donald P.; Kuklinski, James H.; Lupia, Arthur (eds.), Cambridge Handbook of Experimental Political Science, Cambridge New York: Cambridge University Press, pp. 258–272, ISBN 978-0-521-17455-8. Pdf.
- Mendelberg, Tali; Myers, C. Daniel (2013), "Political deliberation", in Huddy, Leonie; Sears, David O.; Levy, Jack S. (eds.), The Oxford handbook of political psychology (2nd ed.), Oxford: Oxford University Press, pp. 699–736, ISBN 978-0-19-976010-7. Pdf.

=== Racial Attitudes ===
- Mendelberg, Tali; Kinder, Donald R. (May 1995). "Cracks in American apartheid: the political impact of prejudice among desegregated whites". The Journal of Politics. 57 (2): 402–424. doi:10.2307/2960313. JSTOR 2960313. S2CID 154277012. Pdf.
- Mendelberg, Tali (May 1997). "Executing Hortons: racial crime in the 1988 presidential campaign". Public Opinion Quarterly. 61 (1): 134–157. doi:10.1086/297790. Pdf.
- Mendelberg, Tali; Kinder, Donald R. (2000), "Individualism reconsidered: principles and prejudice in contemporary American opinion", in Sears, David O.; Sidanius, Jim; Bobo, Lawrence D. (eds.), Racialized politics: the debate about racism in America, Chicago: University of Chicago Press, pp. 44–74, ISBN 978-0-226-74407-0.
- Mendelberg, Tali; Oleske, John (April 2000). "Race and public deliberation". Political Communication. 17 (2): 169–191. doi:10.1080/105846000198468. S2CID 39737712. Pdf.
- Mendelberg, Tali; Oliver, J. Eric (July 2000). "Reconsidering the environmental determinants of white racial attitudes". American Journal of Political Science. 44 (3): 574–589. doi:10.2307/2669265. JSTOR 2669265. Pdf.
- Mendelberg, Tali (2001). The race card: campaign strategy, implicit messages, and the norm of equality. Princeton, New Jersey: Princeton University Press. ISBN 9780691070711
- Mendelberg, Tali; Berinsky, Adam J. (October 2005). "The indirect effects of discredited stereotypes in judgments of Jewish leaders". American Journal of Political Science. 49 (4): 845–864. doi:10.1111/j.1540-5907.2005.00159.x. Pdf.
- Mendelberg, Tali (March 2008). "Racial priming revived". Perspectives on Politics. 6 (1): 109–123. doi:10.1017/S1537592708080092. S2CID 56446412. Pdf.
- Mendelberg, Tali (March 2008). "Racial priming: issues in research design and interpretation". Perspectives on Politics. 6 (1): 135–140. doi:10.1017/S1537592708080110. S2CID 10375080. Pdf.
- Mendelberg, Tali (2009), "Deliberation, incivility, and race in electoral campaigns", in King, Desmond; Lieberman, Robert; Ritter, Gretchen; et al. (eds.), Democratization in America: a comparative-historical analysis, Baltimore: Johns Hopkins University Press, pp. 157–186, ISBN 978-0-8018-9325-4. Pdf.
- Mendelberg, Tali; Berinsky, Adam; Hutchings, Vincent; Shaker, Lee; Valentino, Nicholas (June 2011). "Sex and race: are black candidates more likely to be disadvantaged by sex scandals?". Political Behavior. 33 (2): 179–202. doi:10.1007/s11109-010-9135-8. S2CID 15987563. Pdf.
- Mendelberg, Tali; Junn, Jane; Czaja, Erica (2011), "Race and the group bases of public opinion", in Berinsky, Adam (ed.), New directions in public opinion, New Directions in American Politics, New York: Routledge, pp. 119–138, ISBN 978-0-415-88529-4. Pdf.
- Mendelberg, Tali; Tokeshi, Matt (2015). "Countering implicit appeals: which strategies work?". Political Communication. 32 (4): 648–672. doi:10.1080/10584609.2014.969463. S2CID 30262783.

=== Political Psychology ===
- Mendelberg, Tali (August 2005). "Bringing the group back into political psychology: Erik H. Erikson early career award address". Political Psychology. 26 (4): 637–650. doi:10.1111/j.1467-9221.2005.00435.x. Pdf.

=== Class Inequality in College ===
- Mendelberg, Tali; McCabe, Katherine; Thal, Adam (October 2014). "The rich are different from you and me": how wealthy student bodies foster economically conservative students (Report). Center for the Study of Democratic Politics (CSDP) and the Mamdouha S. Bobst Center for Peace and Justice. Pdf.

== See also ==
- Deliberative democracy
- Feminist philosophy
- Feminist theory
- Political philosophy
