= Yanna Krupnikov =

Political scientist

- Education: University of Michigan (Ph.D.); University of Toronto (M.A.); Brandeis University (B.A.)
- Scientific career
- Fields: Political science
- Workplaces: University of Michigan (2023–); Stony Brook University (2016–2021); Northwestern University (2012–2014); Indiana University Bloomington (2009–2012)
- Thesis: Who Votes? How and When Negative Campaign Advertisements Affect Voter Turnout (2009)
- Website: yannakrupnikov.com

Yanna Krupnikov is a political scientist and professor of communication and media at the University of Michigan's College of Literature, Science, and the Arts. She researches political communication.

== Life ==
Krupnikov earned a B.A. in politics from Brandeis University. She completed a M.A. in political science at the University of Toronto. She earned a Ph.D. in political science at the University of Michigan.

Krupnikov researches political communication. From 2009 to 2012, Krupnikov was an assistant professor of political science at Indiana University Bloomington. She was an assistant professor of political science at Northwestern University from 2012 to 2014. She joined Stony Brook University in 2014 as an assistant professor and was promoted to associate professor in 2016 and professor in 2021. She joined the College of Literature, Science, and the Arts at the University of Michigan as a professor in the department of communication and media in 2023.

== Selected works ==
- Klar, Samara; Krupnikov, Yanna (2016). Independent Politics: How American Disdain for Parties Leads to Political Inaction. Cambridge University Press. ISBN 978-1-107-13446-1.
- Soroka, Stuart; Krupnikov, Yanna (2021). The Increasing Viability of Good News. Cambridge University Press. ISBN 978-1-108-98708-0.
- Krupnikov, Yanna; Ryan, John Barry (2022). The Other Divide: Polarization and Disengagement in American Politics. Cambridge University Press. ISBN 978-1-108-83112-3.
- Searles, Kathleen; Krupnikov, Yanna; Ryan, John Barry; Style, Hillary (2023). Constructing Political Expertise in the News. Cambridge University Press. ISBN 978-1-009-10843-0.
- Druckman, James N.; Klar, Samara; Krupnikov, Yanna; Levendusky, Matthew; Ryan, John Barry (2024). Partisan Hostility and American Democracy. University of Chicago Press. ISBN 978-0-226-83365-1.
