= Samara Klar =

American political scientist

- Education: McGill University; Columbia University; Northwestern University
- Known for: Women Also Know Stuff
- Scientific career
- Fields: Political science
- Workplaces: University of Arizona
- Doctoral advisor: James Druckman
- Website: samaraklar.com

Samara Klar is an American political scientist and professor at the University of Arizona. She founded the Women Also Know Stuff database in 2016.

== Life ==
Klar earned a B.A. in political science and sociology with distinction from McGill University in 2005. She completed a M.A. in political science with a focus on American politics and journalism at the Columbia University in 2006. She earned a M.A. (2009) and Ph.D. (2013) in political science with a focus on American politics and quantitative methodology from Northwestern University. Her dissertation was titled, The Influence of Identities on Political Preferences. James Druckman was her doctoral advisor.

Klar researches the relationship between an individual's personal identities and social surroundings and their political attitudes. She joined the University of Arizona school of government and public policy in 2013 as an assistant professor. She was promoted to associate professor in May 2018 and professor in May 2023. She founded the Women Also Know Stuff in 2016 and served on its editorial board until 2023. It is a website designed to combat implicit bias and sexism in academia and promote female scholars in political science.

== Selected works ==
- Klar, Samara; Krupnikov, Yanna (2016). Independent Politics. Cambridge University Press. ISBN 978-1-107-13446-1.
- Druckman, James N.; Klar, Samara; Krupnikov, Yanna; Levendusky, Matthew; Ryan, John Barry (2024). Partisan Hostility and American Democracy. University of Chicago Press. ISBN 978-0-226-83365-1.
