= Iraq War and the war on terror =

Iraq-US relations

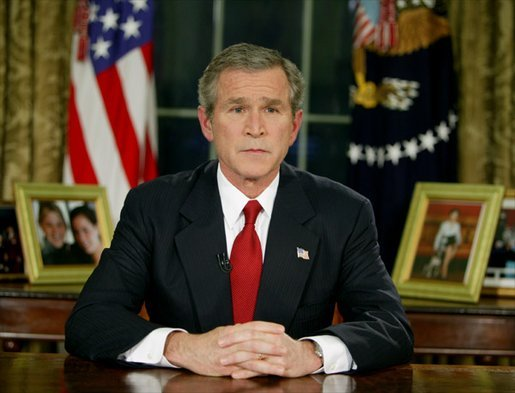
On 19 March 2003, President George W. Bush addressed the nation from the Oval Office, announcing the beginning of Operation Iraqi Freedom. "The people of the United States and our friends and allies will not live at the mercy of an outlaw regime that threatens the peace with weapons of mass murder." The Senate committee found that many of the administration's pre-war statements about Iraqi WMD were not supported by the underlying intelligence.

The Iraq War, along with the War in Afghanistan, was described by President of the United States George W. Bush as "the central front in the War on Terror", and argued that if the U.S. pulled out of Iraq, "terrorists will follow us here."

"War on terror" discourse dominated US media outlets for several post-9/11 years. In 2003, majority of Americans believed Iraqi-links to 9/11 conspiracy theory, which facilitated the Bush administration's agenda for the invasion of Iraq. Throughout the 2000s, political consensus in United States juxtaposed Iraq within the framework of the "war on terror". Despite the emergence of dissent to the consensus in the late 2000s; Republican politicians, candidates and advocacy groups continued to paint the Iraq-centric strategy as the solution to the "9/11 problem".

As the conflict dragged on, members of the U.S. Congress, the American public, and even U.S. troops have questioned the connection between the Iraq War and the fight against terrorism. Multiple leading intelligence experts have argued that the war in Iraq actually increased terrorism. The ensuing conflict in Iraq has seen prolonged American involvement in the country against several insurgent groups.

== U.S. framing of Iraq War ==
"The battle of Iraq is one victory in a war on terror that began on September the 11, 2001, and still goes on. That terrible morning, 19 evil men -- the shock troops of a hateful ideology -- gave America and the civilized world a glimpse of their ambitions. They imagined, in the words of one terrorist, that September the 11th would be the "beginning of the end of America"... The liberation of Iraq is a crucial advance in the campaign against terror. We've removed an ally of al Qaeda, and cut off a source of terrorist funding. And this much is certain: No terrorist network will gain weapons of mass destruction from the Iraqi regime, because the regime is no more... Our mission continues. Al Qaeda is wounded, not destroyed... The war on terror is not over; yet it is not endless. We do not know the day of final victory, but we have seen the turning of the tide."

— US President George W. Bush, "Mission Accomplished" speech (1 May 2003)

The National Strategy of Combating Terrorism published by the US government in 2003 pitted a dualistic "us vs them" narrative, defining America's enemy as "terrorism". In a presidential letter to the Speaker of House of Representatives delivered a day after the launch of the Iraq invasion, Bush claimed that Ba'athist Iraq harboured and supported terrorists that carried out the September 11 attacks. The National Security Strategy of 2006 associated terrorism with rogue regimes across the world which "hate the United States and everything for which it stands". Throughout the Iraqi insurgency, the US government depicted Iraq as a crucial frontline to eliminate the "geographic base" of the terrorists who perpetrated 9/11 attacks.

During the 2004 presidential campaign, Republican strategy was based on exaggerating the Iraqi 9/11 conspiracy theory and presenting the Iraq war as a major front in the "war on terror". Rival presidential candidate John Kerry also agreed with this narrative, criticizing the Bush administration's pitfalls for not organizing a "smarter, tougher, more effective war on terror". So pervasive was the propaganda that the military campaigns were often compared to the Second World War and the US president linked Hurricane Katrina with the "war on terror" efforts. However, after repeated failures in the Iraq war and rising war-weariness, these narratives became controversial within the United States starting from the late 2000s. Despite acknowledging that Ba'athist Iraq had no links to 9/11 attacks in 2007, the Bush administration continued to justify the prolongation of the Iraq War in the post-9/11 framework, claiming that a defeat in Iraq would make the United States "vulnerable" to external threats.

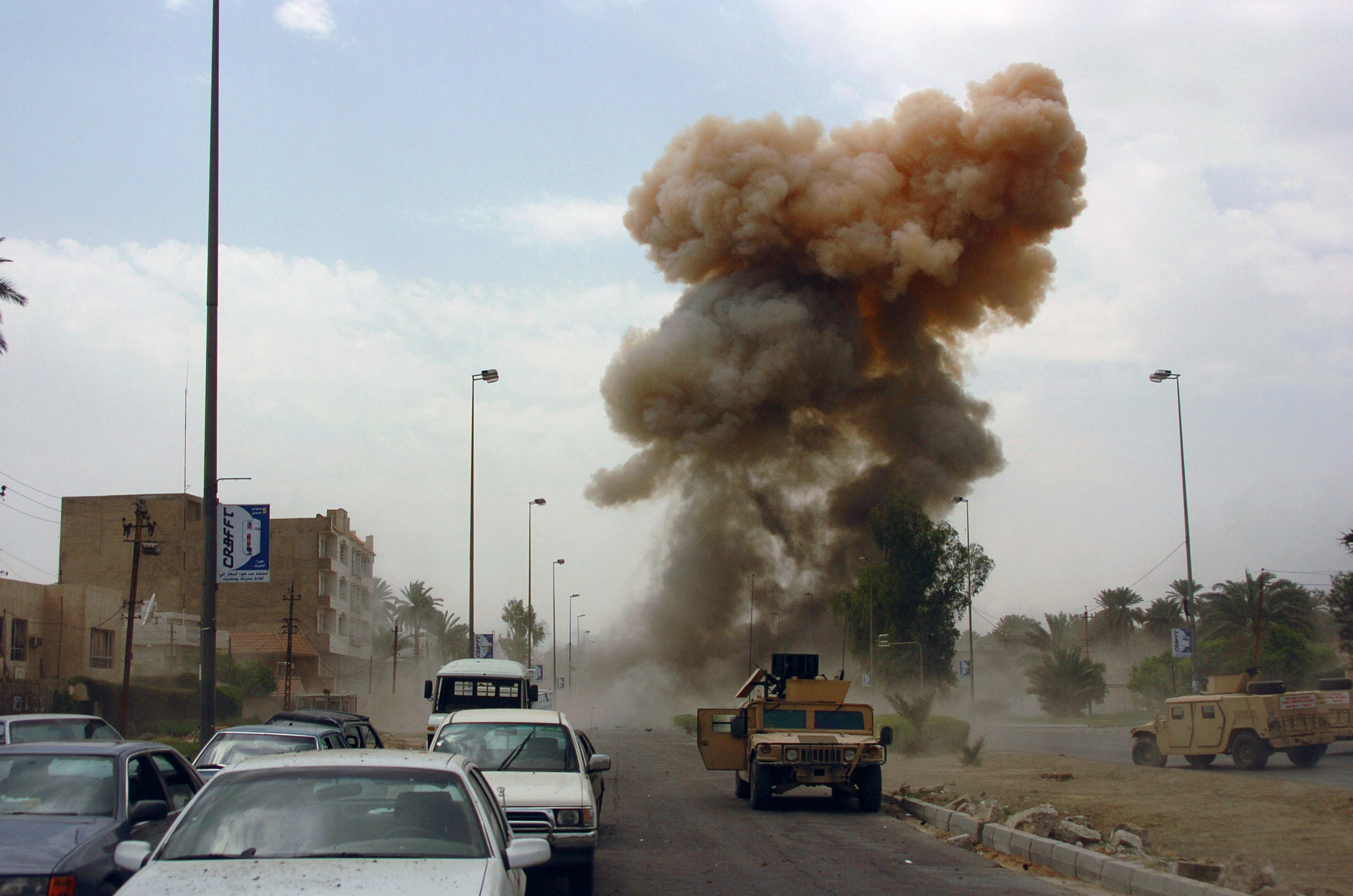
As Coalition Forces arrive at a car bombing in South Baghdad, a second car bomb is detonated, targeting those responding to the initial incident. April 14, 2005

According to the Israel Intelligence Heritage & Commemoration Center, Saddam Hussein had a long history before the invasion of giving money to families of suicide bombers in Palestine. As part of the justification for the war, the Bush administration argued that Saddam Hussein also had ties to al-Qaeda, and that his overthrow would lead to democratization in the Middle East, decreasing terrorism overall. However, reports from the CIA, the U.S. State Department, the FBI, and the Senate Select Committee on Intelligence, as well as the investigations of foreign intelligence agencies found no evidence of an operational connection between Saddam and al-Qaeda.

Various intelligence experts have asserted that the Iraq war only served to exponentially increase terrorism. Counterterrorism expert Rohan Gunaratna frequently refers to the invasion of Iraq as a "fatal mistake." London's conservative International Institute for Strategic Studies concluded in 2004 that the occupation of Iraq had become "a potent global recruitment pretext" for jihadists, and that the invasion "galvanized" al-Qaeda and "perversely inspired insurgent violence" there. The U.S. National Intelligence Council concluded in a January 2005 report that Iraq had overtaken Afghanistan as the primary training ground for the next generation of jihadist terrorists. The council's chairman, Robert L. Hutchings, said, "At the moment, Iraq is a magnet for international terrorist activity." And the 2006 National Intelligence Estimate, which outlined the considered judgment of all 16 U.S. intelligence agencies, held that "The Iraq conflict has become the 'cause celebre' for jihadists, breeding a deep resentment of US involvement in the Muslim world and cultivating supporters for the global jihadist movement." According to Mohammed Hafez, "Since 2003, the number of suicide bombings in Iraq has surpassed all those of Hamas in Israel, Hezbollah in Lebanon, and the Tamil Tigers in Sri Lanka combined."

== Responses of militant organizations ==
=== Al-Qaeda ===
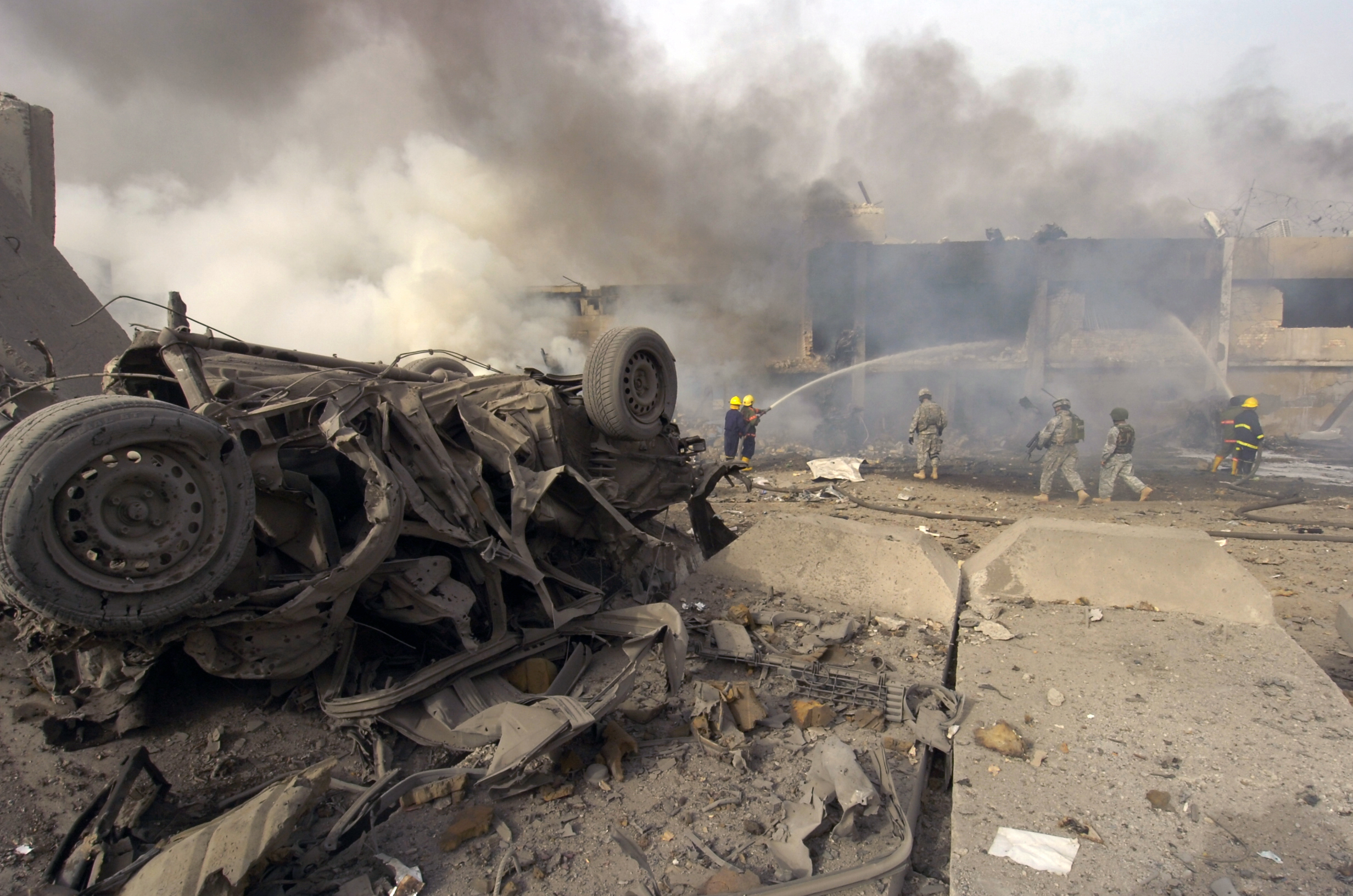
The bombing of Al Sabaah, 2006

In October 2003, Osama bin Laden announced: "Be glad of the good news: America is mired in the swamps of the Tigris and Euphrates. Bush is, through Iraq and its oil, easy prey. Here is he now, thank God, in an embarrassing situation and here is America today being ruined before the eyes of the whole world." Al-Qaeda commander Seif al-Adl gloated about the war in Iraq, indicating, "The Americans took the bait and fell into our trap." A letter thought to be from al-Qaeda leader Atiyah Abd al-Rahman found in Iraq among the rubble where al-Zarqawi was killed and released by the U.S. military in October 2006, indicated that al-Qaeda perceived the war as beneficial to its goals: "The most important thing is that the jihad continues with steadfastness ... indeed, prolonging the war is in our interest.".

=== Hamas ===
Urging Muslim fighters to travel to Iraq and engage in Istish'hadi operations against American and British troops, Hamas leader 'Abd al-'Azeez al-Rantisi said during a rally at the Jabalia refugee camp in January 2003: "We call on the Arabs and Muslims to burn the land under the feet of the American invaders, especially our brothers in Saudi Arabia because this war is not against Iraq, it's against the Islamic nation...".

On February 7, 2003, Hamas leader Ahmad Yassin published an open letter demanding a boycott of all products from the United States and its allies, and urged Muslims to "threaten Western interests and strike them everywhere" if the United States launched a war against Iraqi people. He further denounced American agendas in Iraq as part of a "crusaders' war" against Islam.

=== Hezbollah ===
Lebanese Shia militant group Hezbollah had long opposed Saddam Hussein due to his suppression of Shia political activists in Iraq. In February 2003, Hassan Nasrallah urged Saddam to resign from power, reconcile with Iraqi opposition leaders, and declare the stockpiles of weapons of mass destruction allegedly in his possession. Muhammad Kawtharani, member of Hezbollah organization's political bureau, said: "We have no intention of becoming a pawn on Saddam Hussein's chessboard."

However, after the fall of Ba'athist regime in Iraq, Hassan Nasrallah urged Iraqis to fight American forces, and stated in April 2003: "The American occupation of Iraq stopped the nightmare of Saddam, but there is a second nightmare, which is the occupation of Iraq by America...". As an Iranian proxy, Hezbollah then formed Unit 3800 and sent elite operatives to Iraq to train local fighters. The unit's primary mission was to train and equip Iraqi Shiite militias, such as the Mahdi Army, Asaib Ahl al-Haq, and Kataib Hezbollah, enhancing their capabilities in guerrilla warfare, kidnappings, and the use of sophisticated improvised explosive devices (IEDs). Some Iraqi militants also received advanced training in Lebanon. The unit then oversaw operations executed against U.S. and coalition forces and provided funds, weapons, and logistical assistance to groups like the Badr Organization, Saraya al-Khorasani, and the al-Mahdi Army.

== U.S. propaganda operations and American public opinion ==
The Pentagon military analyst program was a propaganda campaign of the U.S. Department of Defense (DoD) that was launched in early 2002 by then-U.S. Assistant Secretary of Defense for Public Affairs Victoria Clarke. The aim of the operation was to spread American war propaganda by presenting retired U.S. military officers as "independent analysts" to media outlets. These retired military officers were briefed by the Pentagon, U.S. State Department and several U.S. government officials to regurgitate Bush administration's talking points on Iraq in their appearances in TV and radio networks across the United States.

At the outset of the war, the U.S. Congress and public opinion supported the notion that the Iraq War was part of the global war on terror. The 2002 congressional resolution authorising military force against Iraq cited the U.S. determination to "prosecute the war on terrorism", and in April 2003, one month after the invasion, a poll found that 77% of Americans agreed that the Iraq War was part of the "war on terror". A poll published by The Washington Post in September 2003 estimated that nearly seven-in-ten Americans continued to believe that Ba'athist Iraq had a role in the September 11 attacks. The poll further revealed that approximately 80% of Americans suspected Saddam of providing support to al-Qaeda.

A study published in 2005 by American political scientists Amy Gershkoff and Shana Kushner Gadarian, which analyzed George Bush's speeches and polling data between September 2001 and May 2003, found that it was the American public's views about Saddam Hussein's perceived connections with al-Qaeda and the September 11 attacks that became the major catalyst behind the rise in support of the 2003 U.S. invasion of Iraq among Americans. According to the findings of the study:

"2003 war in Iraq received high levels of public support because the Bush administration successfully framed the conflict as an extension of the war on terror, which was a response to the September 11, 2001, attack on the World Trade Center and the Pentagon. Our analysis of Bush's speeches reveals that the administration consistently connected Iraq with 9/11. ... In addition, 55 percent supported the war even without the United Nations’ authorization, even if the United Nations actively opposed the action. Support was not conditional on the United States uncovering WMD in Iraq; more than three-quarters of Americans endorsed the war regardless of whether WMD were ever found. .... Surprisingly, respondents who considered al Qaeda to be America’s most important threat were more likely to favor invading Iraq than those who thought Iraq was America’s most important threat."

Much of the organized violence inflicted by the U.S. military was framed by the metaphor of a crusade, or total conflict, a perception that was taken up by the Iraqi insurgents in their anti-American propaganda. A 2004 U.S. Army War College report asserted that the war diverts attention and resources from the military operations against Al Qaeda and proposed "downsizing the war on terrorism", since it was viewed as lacking "strategic clarity", unrealistic, and un-sustainable. The report criticized the Bush administration's conflation of al-Qaeda and Iraqi Ba'athists, and argued that the primary focus of U.S. armed forces should be directed against al-Qaeda and its allies. As the military and civilian death toll has mounted, the Iraqi insurgency has shifted to what many observers have labeled a civil war, and the politics of Iraq have remained unstable, many politicians and citizens from the United States and across the world have begun pushing for the U.S. to withdraw from Iraq. Throughout the 2000s, U.S. media outlets, politicians and wider American public viewed the military operations in Iraq as an integral part of the Bush administration's "war on terror".

In spring 2007, surveys showed a majority of Americans in support of a timetable for withdrawal. While up to 70 percent of Americans in one survey favored withdrawal, most preferred to leave gradually over 12 months, and 60 percent stated that the U.S. had a moral obligation to the Iraqi people. In addition to voicing concerns over the human and financial costs of the war, supporters of withdrawal argue that the U.S. presence fosters ongoing violence by providing a target for al-Qaeda. It also allows Iraqi political leaders to avoid reaching a power-sharing agreement. The withdrawal will induce Iraq's neighbors to become more involved in quelling violence in the country and will relieve the strain on the U.S. military. The withdrawal debate has brought comparison of Iraq and Vietnam wars.

After the 2006 midterm congressional elections, Congress pushed to begin withdrawing troops from Iraq, in part based on the argument that Iraq was a distraction, as opposed to a part of, the war on terror. Likewise, a January 2007 poll found that 57% of Americans felt that the Iraq War was not part of the war on terror. By June 2007, polls revealed that only 30% of Americans supported the war. On July 12, 2007, the House passed a resolution by 223 to 201, for redeployment [or withdrawal] of U.S. armed forces out of Iraq. The resolution required most troops to withdraw from Iraq by April 1, 2008.

A 2008 study conducted by two investigative journalism organizations (Center for Public Integrity and Foundation for Independent Journalism) revealed that between September 2001 and September 2003, George W. Bush and seven senior officials in his administration issued explicit statements on at least 532 occasions claiming that Iraq possessed weapons of mass destruction or had established covert alliances with al-Qaeda, or both. The study concluded that such statements were issued by the American government as part of an "orchestrated campaign" to generate jingoistic attitudes in the United States in order to initiate a war based on "false pretenses". According to the report:

"The cumulative effect of these false statements — amplified by thousands of news stories and broadcasts — was massive, with the media coverage creating an almost impenetrable din for several critical months in the run-up to war."

== See also ==
- Iraqi Conflict (2003-present)
  - Iraq War (2003–2011)
  - Iraqi insurgency (2011–2013)
  - War in Iraq (2013–2017)
  - Islamic State insurgency in Iraq (2017-present)
