= Kuklinski =

Kuklinski or Kukliński (feminine: Kuklińska, plural: Kuklińscy) is a Polish surname. Notable people with the surname include:

- Antoni Kukliński (1927–2015), Polish economist
- Richard Kuklinski (1935–2006), Polish-American contract killer nicknamed "The Iceman"
- Ryszard Kukliński (1930–2004), Polish Army Colonel, anti-communist spy
- Joseph Kuklinski (1944–2003), murderer, younger brother of Richard Kuklinski
- James Kuklinski (born 1946), American political scientist
