= The Race Card (disambiguation) =

The Race Card is an idiomatic expression accusing someone of racism.

The Race Card or race card, may also refer to:

- The Race Card (book), a 2001 political book by Tali Mendelberg
- "The Race Card", the fifth episode of The People v. O. J. Simpson: American Crime Story
- A type of identity document indicating race; such as the U.S. BIA's "Certificate of Degree of Indian Blood" or "Kennkarte" of WWII Germany
- Racecard, a printed card used in horseracing

== See also ==
- The Grace Card, a 2010 drama film
