= Nancy Mathiowetz =

American sociologist and statistician

Nancy A. Mathiowetz is an American sociologist and statistician, known for her pioneering combination of cognitive psychology with survey methodology and for her research on poverty and disability.

She is a professor emerita of sociology at the University of Wisconsin–Milwaukee, the former president of the American Association for Public Opinion Research, and the former editor-in-chief of Public Opinion Quarterly.

== Education ==
Mathiowetz did her undergraduate studies at the University of Wisconsin–Madison, graduating in 1978 with a bachelor's degree in sociology. She went on to graduate study at the University of Michigan, completing a master's degree in biostatistics in 1983 and a Ph.D. in sociology in 1988. Her dissertation was The Applicability of Cognitive Theory to Long-Term Recall Questions in Social Surveys.

== Career ==
While completing her graduate education, Mathiowetz had become a professional statistician, joining Westat as a researcher in 1984. She moved to the National Center for Health Services Research in 1987, and again to the United States Census Bureau in 1990. At the census, she worked under Robert Groves, at that time the census's Associate Director for Statistical Design, Methodology and Standards. From 1992 to 1995 she was deputy director of statistics and research methodology at the Agency for Health Care Policy and Research within the Public Health Service.

In 1995, Mathiowetz returned to academia as an assistant professor in the Joint Program in Survey Methodology at the University of Maryland, College Park, where she had already held an adjunct position since 1993. She moved to the University of Wisconsin–Milwaukee, as an associate professor of sociology in 2003, was promoted to full professor in 2005, and chaired the department from 2005 to 2009.

She served as the 2007-2008 president of the American Association for Public Opinion Research. With James N. Druckman, she was co-editor-in-chief of Public Opinion Quarterly for four volumes, from 2008 to 2012.

== Recognition ==
In 2012 Mathiowetz was elected as a Fellow of the American Statistical Association. The American Association for Public Opinion Research gave her their Award for Exceptionally Distinguished Achievement in 2015.
