= John R. Kimberly =

- Born
- Occupations: Organizational consultant, academic and author

Academic background
- Education: B.A., Sociology (1964); M.S., Organizational Behavior (1967); Ph.D., Organizational Behavior (1970)
- Alma mater: Yale University; Cornell University

Academic work
- Institutions: The Wharton School, University of Pennsylvania

John R. Kimberly is an organizational consultant, academic, and author who consults for organizations on issues related to leadership, innovation, and organizational design. He is the Henry Bower Professor Emeritus of Management and Professor Emeritus of Health Care Management in The Wharton School at University of Pennsylvania.

Kimberly's research focuses on health policy, institutional development, managerial innovation, organizational change, and organizational design, having authored/edited over ten books, including The Globalization of Managerial Innovation in Health Care and The End of an Illusion: The Future of Health Policy in Western Industrialized Nations, as well as journal articles.

== Education and early career ==
Kimberly received his B.A. in sociology from Yale University in 1964 and his M.S. in organizational behavior from Cornell University in 1967. He served as associate director of the Program on the Management and Organization of Science at Cornell from 1968 to 1969 and earned his Ph.D. there in 1970. From 1970 to 1975, he was an assistant professor at the University of Illinois, Urbana-Champaign (UIUC), and a resident fellow at the Center for Advanced Study between 1973 and 1974. He then became a visiting fellow in the U.S.-France Exchange of Scientists Program at the École Polytechnique in Paris for a year.

== Career ==
Kimberly held the position of assistant professor at Yale University from 1976 to 1977, and was promoted to associate professor in 1977. In 1982, he joined The Wharton School, University of Pennsylvania as an associate professor in the Departments of Management and Health Care Management, and became a senior fellow at The Leonard Davis Institute of Health Economics (Penn LDI). In 1985, he was promoted to professor in the same departments, and was chair of the Department of Management from 1986 to 1989. Since 1989, he has held The Henry Bower Professorship in the Departments of Management and Health Care Management at Wharton and as professor emeritus since 2020.

From 1999 to 2002, Kimberly was a Visiting Professor of Organizational Behavior at INSEAD and held The Novartis Chaired Professorship in Healthcare Management, where he launched INSEAD's Healthcare Management Initiative. He became the Executive Director of Wharton's Global Alliance with INSEAD in 2002, a position he held until 2014.

Kimberly has served as a scientific advisor to the OECD's Directorate for Science, Technology, and Industry, as well as the Directorate for Scientific Affairs in Paris. Additionally, he has contributed to the Health Care Technology Study Section at the National Center for Health Services Research and Health Care Technology Assessment and the Advisory Panel on Technology and the Handicapped for the U.S. Congress Office of Technology Assessment.

Kimberly held fellowships at the Center for Managerial Innovation from 1978 to 1980 and at École Polytechnique from 1989 to 1990, served as a visiting professor and Salmon and Rameau Fellow in Healthcare at INSEAD from 1996 to 1999 and again from 2003 to 2007, and was a distinguished visiting scholar in strategy at INSEAD from 2014 to 2018.

== Research ==
With a focus on organizational design and transformation, Kimberly's work has had implications for the field, starting with his 1980 edited book, The Organizational Life Cycle: Issues in the Creation, Transformation, and Decline of Organizations. Andrew Pettigrew praised the work, writing, "Kimberly and Miles have used their knowledge and interest in the birth, transformation, and development of organizations to pull together a very useful collection of chapters on the 'organizational life cycle.'" He also stated, "It is a coherently presented statement designed to help influence the field to move in a particular direction," and in the same line, Brian Rowan reviewed the book positively, classifying the included papers as "strong." Afterward, in 1984, he co-authored the book Managing Organizational Transitions with Robert E. Quinn. They emphasized the underappreciated behavioral aspects of organizational transitions and provided original case studies and conceptual papers.

Kimberly also made contributions to health policy and healthcare management. In The End of an Illusion: The Future of Health Policy in Western Industrialized Nations, he explored the key issues shaping health policy debates in the 1980s and beyond. David Blumenthal described this work as "an ambitious intellectual journey over time, space, and a variety of national and ideological terrains." His next edited volume, The Quality Imperative, examined the global challenges of healthcare reform, particularly in balancing cost, access, and quality, and combined theoretical insights with case studies for a comprehensive view. In his 2007 book The Soul of the Corporation, co-authored with Hamid Bouchikhi, he demonstrated the benefits companies gained by understanding and leveraging identity as a key asset to influence performance, while also highlighting the negative consequences of failing to grasp its significance. Later, he collaborated with Gerard de Pouvourville and Thomas A. D'Aunno on The Globalization of Managerial Innovation in Health Care, a study of how patient classification systems based on Diagnosis Related Groups (DRGs) were adopted in fifteen countries. Through case studies, this work illustrated the motivations, challenges, and lessons learned in implementing innovations across various national healthcare systems.

In addition to his books, Kimberly's research has produced research papers. In his early work, he investigated the role of organizational size, emphasizing the dilemmas it presents and advocating for a more nuanced understanding of its impact on structure. He then explored the creation of organizations in a paper published in the Academy of Management Journal, focusing on initiation, innovation, and institutionalization. This longitudinal study revealed that the features driving early success often conflicted with those necessary for long-term survival, highlighting the importance of a biographical approach in organizational analysis. Building on these themes, his highly cited 1981 research work demonstrated that individual, organizational, and contextual factors are stronger predictors of technological innovation adoption in hospitals than administrative innovation, with organizational size emerging as the strongest predictor for both types.

In 2012, Kimberly evaluated research on the sustainability of evidence-based healthcare programs, finding that many studies relied on vague definitions and self-reports while lacking rigorous evaluations, which underscored the importance of organizational context and program-specific factors. More recently, in 2021, his research shed light on the complex process of decommissioning healthcare services in the English National Health Service. This study highlighted the role of institutional factors and political vulnerability in determining outcomes, revealing that successful service closures depend on the scale of proposed changes and the level of macro-level support, alongside political partisanship.

== Bibliography ==
=== Selected books ===
- The Organizational Life Cycle: Issues in the Creation, Transformation, and Decline of Organizations (1980) ISBN 9780875894591
- New Futures: The Challenge of Managing Corporate Transitions (1984) ISBN 9780870944703
- The End of an Illusion: The Future of Health Policy in Western Industrialized Nations (1984) ISBN 9780520330504
- The Quality Imperative: Measurement and Management of Quality in Healthcare (1999) ISBN 9781783261987
- The Soul of the Corporation: How to Manage the Identity of Your Company (2007) ISBN 9780131857261
- The Globalization of Managerial Innovation in Health Care (2008) ISBN 9780521885003

=== Selected articles ===
- Kimberly, J. R. (1976). Organizational size and the structuralist perspective: A review, critique, and proposal. Administrative science quarterly, 571-597.
- Kimberly, J. R., & Evanisko, M. J. (1981). Organizational innovation: The influence of individual, organizational, and contextual factors on hospital adoption of technological and administrative innovations. Academy of management journal, 24(4), 689-713.
- Bouchikhi, H., & Kimberly, J. R. (2003). Escaping the identity trap. MIT Sloan Management Review.
- Wiltsey Stirman, S., Kimberly, J., Cook, N., Calloway, A., Castro, F., & Charns, M. (2012). The sustainability of new programs and innovations: a review of the empirical literature and recommendations for future research. Implementation science, 7, 1-19.
- Minvielle, E., Waelli, M., Sicotte, C., & Kimberly, J. R. (2014). Managing customization in health care: a framework derived from the services sector literature. Health Policy, 117(2), 216-227.
