= Jane Mansbridge bibliography =

The Jane Mansbridge bibliography includes books, book chapters and journal articles by Jane Mansbridge, the Charles F. Adams Professor of Political Leadership and Democratic Values, Kennedy School of Government, Harvard University.

== Books ==
- Mansbridge, Jane J (1983). Beyond adversary democracy. Chicago: University of Chicago Press. ISBN 9780226503554.
- Mansbridge, Jane J (1986). Why we lost the ERA (Equal Rights Amendment). Chicago: University of Chicago Press. ISBN 9780226503578.
- Mansbridge, Jane J, ed. (1990). Beyond self-interest. Chicago and London: University of Chicago Press. ISBN 9780226503608.
- Mansbridge, Jane J; Okin, Susan Moller (1994). Feminism. Schools of Thought in Politics. Aldershot, England Brookfield, Vermont, USA: E. Elgar. ISBN 9781852785659.
- Mansbridge, Jane J; Morris, Aldon (eds) (2001). Oppositional consciousness: the subjective roots of social protest. Chicago: University of Chicago Press. ISBN 9780226503622.
- Mansbridge, Jane J; Parkinson, John (eds) (2012). Deliberative systems. Cambridge: Cambridge University Press. ISBN 9781107025394.
- Mansbridge, Jane J; Martin, Cathie Jo (eds) (2014). Negotiating agreement in politics. Washington, D.C.: American Political Science Association. ISBN 9781878147479.

== Chapters in books ==
1975 - 1979

- Mansbridge, Jane J (1975), "Time, emotion and inequality: three problems of participatory groups", in Hellriegel, Don; Slocum, John W (eds.), Management in the world today, Reading, Massachusetts: Addison-Wesley Longman, ISBN 9780201028331
- Mansbridge, Jane J (1975), "The limits of friendship", in Chapman, John W; Pennock, James Ronald (American Society for Political and Legal Philosophy) (eds.), Participation in politics: NOMOS XVI, vol. 16, New York: Lieber-Atherton, pp. 246–275, ISBN 9780883110218
- Mansbridge, Jane J (1976), "Town meeting democracy", in Collier, Peter (ed.), Dilemmas of democracy: readings in American government, New York: Harcourt Brace Jovanovich, pp. 148–167, ISBN 9780155176508
- Mansbridge, Jane J (1977), "Making a lot of noise: problems of women's leadership in a participatory democracy", in Geiselman, Lucy A (ed.), Proceedings of the conference on women's leadership and authority in the health professions, Santa Cruz, California: The Program (University of California), pp. 218–231
- Mansbridge, Jane J (1979), "The agony of inequality", in Case, John; Taylor, Rosemary C R (eds.), Co-ops, communes & collectives: experiments in social change in the 1960s and 1970s, New York: Pantheon Books, pp. 194–214, ISBN 9780394420073

1980 - 1989

- Mansbridge, Jane J (1982), "Fears of conflict in face-to-face democracies", in Lindenfeld, Frank; Rothschild-Whitt, Joyce (eds.), Workplace democracy and social change, Boston, MA: Porter Sargent Publishers, pp. 125–137, ISBN 9780875581019
- Mansbridge, Jane J (1984), "Did the ERA (Equal Rights Amendment) mandate women in combat", in Loring, Nancy (ed.), Women in the United States armed forces: progress and barriers in the 1980s, Chicago, Illinois: Inter-University Seminar Press, pp. 36–45
- Mansbridge, Jane J (1988), "Motivating deliberation in congress", in Thurow, Sarah B (ed.), El [sic] pluribus unum: constitutional principles and the institutions of government, vol. 2, Lanham, Maryland: University Press of America, pp. 59–86, ISBN 9780819167798
- Mansbridge, Jane J (1988), "The equal opportunity to exercise power", in Bowie, Norman E (ed.), Equal opportunity, Boulder, Colorado: Westview Press, pp. 131–154, ISBN 9780813305677

1990 - 1994

- Mansbridge, Jane J (1990), "The rise and fall of self-interest", in Mansbridge, Jane J (ed.), Beyond self-interest, Chicago and London: University of Chicago Press, pp. 3–22, ISBN 9780226503608
- Mansbridge, Jane J (1990), "Expanding the range of formal modelling", in Mansbridge, Jane J (ed.), Beyond self-interest, Chicago and London: University of Chicago Press, pp. 254–266, ISBN 9780226503608
- Mansbridge, Jane J (1990), "Organizing for the ERA (Equal Rights Amendment): cracks in the facade of unity", in Tilly, Louise A; Gurin, Patricia (eds.), Women, politics, and change, New York: Russell Sage foundation, pp. 323–338, ISBN 978-0871548856
- Mansbridge, Jane J (1990), "On the relation of altruism and self-interest", in Mansbridge, Jane J (ed.), Beyond self-interest, Chicago and London: University of Chicago Press, pp. 133–143, ISBN 9780226503608 Reprinted in Mansbridge, Jane J (1992), "On the relation of altruism and self-interest", in Zey, Mary (ed.), Decision making: alternatives to rational choice models, Newbury Park, California: Sage, pp. 112–128, ISBN 9780803947504
- Mansbridge, Jane J (1992), "A paradox of size", in Krimerman, Len; Lindenfield, Frank; Korty, Carol; et al. (eds.), From the ground up: essays on grassroots and workplace democracy, Montréal: Black Rose Books, pp. 159–176, ISBN 9781895431322
- Mansbridge, Jane J (1992), "A deliberative theory of interest representation", in Petracca, Mark P (ed.), The politics of interests: interest groups transformed, Boulder, Colorado: Westview Press, pp. 32–57, ISBN 9780813310015
- Mansbridge, Jane J; Hauser, Ewa; Heyns, Barbara (1993), "Feminism in the interstices of politics and culture: Poland in transition", in Funk, Nanette; Mueller, Magda (eds.), Gender politics and post-communism: reflections from eastern Europe and the former Soviet Union, New York: Routledge, pp. 257–273, ISBN 9780415904773
- Mansbridge, Jane J (1993), "Macpherson's neglect of the political", in Carens, Joseph H (ed.), Democracy and possessive individualism the intellectual legacy of C.B. Macpherson, Albany, N.Y: State University of New York Press, pp. 155–173, ISBN 978-0791414583
- Mansbridge, Jane J (1993), "Self-interest and political transformation", in Marcus, George E; Hanson, Russell L (eds.), Reconsidering the democratic public, University Park, Pennsylvania: Pennsylvania State University Press, pp. 91–109, ISBN 9780271009278
- Mansbridge, Jane J (1993), "Feminism and democratic community", in Chapman, John W; Shapiro, Ian (eds.), Democratic Community: NOMOS XXXV, vol. 35, New York: New York University Press, pp. 342–377, ISBN 9780814715079
- Mansbridge, Jane J (1994), "Feminism and the forms of freedom", in Fischer, Frank; Sirianni, Carmen (eds.), Critical studies in organization and bureaucracy (second ed.), Philadelphia: Temple University Press, pp. 544–553, ISBN 978-1566391221
- Mansbridge, Jane J (1994), "Politics as persuasion", in Dodd, Lawrence C; Jillson, Calvin C (eds.), The Dynamics of American politics: approaches and interpretations, Boulder, Colorado: Westview Press, pp. 298–311, ISBN 9780813317120
- Mansbridge, Jane J (1994), "Public spirit in political systems", in Aaron, Henry J; Mann, Thomas E; Taylor, Timothy (eds.), Values and public policy, Washington, D.C.: Brookings Institution, pp. 146–172, ISBN 9780815700562

1995 - 1999

- Mansbridge, Jane J (1995), "What is the feminist movement?", in Ferree, Myra M; Martin, Patricia Y (eds.), Feminist organizations: harvest of the new women's movement, Philadelphia: Temple University Press, pp. 27–34, ISBN 9781566392297
- Mansbridge, Jane J (1995), "Justice", in Richard W, Fox; Kloppenberg, James T (eds.), A companion to American thought, Oxford: Blackwell Publishers, pp. 361–365, ISBN 9780631206569
- Mansbridge, Jane J (1995), "A deliberative perspective on neocorporatism", in Cohen, Joshua; Rogers, Joel (eds.), Associations and democracy (volume 1 of the real utopias project), London New York: Verso, pp. 133–147, ISBN 9781859840481
- Mansbridge, Jane J (1996), "Using power/fighting power: the polity", in Benhabib, Seyla (ed.), Democracy and difference: contesting the boundaries of the political, Princeton, N.J: Princeton University Press, pp. 46–66, ISBN 9780691044781
- Mansbridge, Jane J (1996), "Reconstructing democracy", in Hirschmann, Nancy J; Stefano, Christine D (eds.), Revisioning the political: feminist reconstructions of traditional concepts in western political theory, Boulder, Colorado: Westview Press, pp. 117–158, ISBN 9780813386393
- Mansbridge, Jane J (1997), "Social and cultural causes of dissatisfaction with US government", in Nye Jr., Joseph S; Zelikow, Philip D; King, David C (eds.), Why people don't trust government, Cambridge, Massachusetts and London, England: Harvard University Press, pp. 133–153, ISBN 9780674940574
- Mansbridge, Jane J (1998), "On the contested nature of the public good", in Powell, Walter W; Clemens, Elisabeth S (eds.), Private action and the public good, New Haven, Conn: Yale University Press, pp. 3–19, ISBN 9780300064490
- Mansbridge, Jane J (1998), "Mary Parker Follett: feminist and negotiator (foreword)", in Follett, Mary (ed.), The new state: group organization the solution of popular government - Mary Parker Follett, University Park, Penn: The Pennsylvania State University Press, pp. xvii–xxviii, ISBN 9780271018256
- Mansbridge, Jane J (1991), "Women, government and the common good: Dialogue, 14-19, (U.S.I.A.)", in Murchland, Bernard (ed.), Higher education and the practice of democratic politics: a political education reader, Dayton, Ohio: Kettering Foundation, pp. 122–135, ISBN 9780923993016 and in Mansbridge, Jane J (1998), "Women, government and the common good", in Phillips, Anne (ed.), Feminism and politics, New York: Oxford University Press, pp. 142–150, ISBN 9780198782056
- Mansbridge, Jane J (1999), "Starting with nothing: on the impossibility of grounding norms solely in self-interest", in Ben-Ner, Avner; Putterman, Louis (eds.), Economics, values, and organization, Cambridge New York, NY: Cambridge University Press, pp. 151–168, ISBN 9780521774116
- Mansbridge, Jane J (1999), "On the idea that participation makes better citizens", in Elkin, Stephen L; Soltan, Karol E (eds.), Citizen competence and democratic institutions, University Park, Pennsylvania: Pennsylvania State University Press, pp. 291–317, ISBN 9780271030180
- Mansbridge, Jane J (1999), ""You're too independent!": how gender, race, and class make many plural feminisms", in Lamont, Michèle (ed.), The cultural territories of race: black and white boundaries, Chicago: University of Chicago Press, pp. 291–317, ISBN 9780226468365
- Mansbridge, Jane J (1999), "Everyday talk in the deliberative system", in Macedo, Stephen (ed.), Deliberative politics: essays on democracy and disagreement, Oxford: Oxford University Press, pp. 211–239, ISBN 9780195131994 translated as Mansbridge, Jane J (2009), "A conversação cotidiana no sistema deliberativo", in Marques, Ângela CS (ed.), A deliberação pública e suas dimensões sociais, politicas e comunicativas: textos fundamentais, Belo Horizonte, Brazil: Autêntica Editora, pp. 207–238
- Mansbridge, Jane J (1999), "Altruistic trust", in Warren, Mark E (ed.), Democracy and trust, Cambridge, UK New York: Cambridge University Press, pp. 290–307, ISBN 9780521646871
- Mansbridge, Jane J; Podziba, Susan L (1999), "Case 3: the Chelsea Charter consensus process", in Susskind, Lawrence E; McKearnen, Sarah; Thomas-Lamar, Jennifer (eds.), The consensus building handbook: a comprehensive guide to reaching agreement, Thousand Oaks, California, London, UK, and Greater Kailash, New Delhi: Sage Publications, pp. 743–772, ISBN 9780761908449

2000 - 2004

- Mansbridge, Jane J (2000), "What does a representative do?", in Kymlicka, Will; Norman, Wayne J (eds.), Citizenship in diverse societies, Oxford New York: Oxford University Press, pp. 99–123, ISBN 9780198296447 and as Mansbridge, Jane J (2000), "The descriptive political representation of gender: an anti-essentialist argument", in Klausen, Jytte; Maier, Charles S (eds.), Has liberalism failed women?: assuring equal representation in Europe and the United States, Basingstoke, Hampshire and New York: Palgrave, pp. 19–38, ISBN 9780333946800 and as Mansbridge, Jane J (2010), "Should blacks represent blacks and women represent women?: a contingent 'yes'", in Krook, Mona L; Childs, Sarah (eds.), Women, gender, and politics: a reader, Oxford New York: Oxford University Press, pp. 201–214, ISBN 9780195368802
- Mansbridge, Jane J (2001), "The making of oppositional consciousness", in Mansbridge, Jane J; Morris, Aldon (eds.), Oppositional consciousness: the subjective roots of social protest, Chicago: University of Chicago Press, pp. 1–19, ISBN 9780226503622
- Mansbridge, Jane J (2001), "Complicating oppositional consciousness", in Mansbridge, Jane J; Morris, Aldon (eds.), Oppositional consciousness: the subjective roots of social protest, Chicago: University of Chicago Press, pp. 238–264, ISBN 9780226503622
- Mansbridge, Jane J (2001), "A 'moral core' solution to the prisoners' dilemma", in Scott, Joan W; Keates, Debra (eds.), Schools of thought: twenty-five years of interpretive social science, Princeton: Princeton University Press, pp. 330–347, ISBN 9780691088426
- Mansbridge, Jane J (2003), "Practice - thought - practice", in Fung, Archon; Wright, Erik O (eds.), Deepening democracy: institutional innovations in empowered participatory governance, London: Verso, pp. 175–199, ISBN 9781859846889
- Mansbridge, Jane J (2003), "Writing as a democrat and a feminist", in Glassner, Barry; Hertz, Rosanna (eds.), Our studies, ourselves: sociologists' lives and work, Oxford New York: Oxford University Press, pp. 127–138, ISBN 9780195146615
- Mansbridge, Jane J (2003), "Whatever happened to ERA (Equal Rights Amendment)?", in Schwarzenbach, Sibyl A; Smith, Patricia (eds.), Women and the United States Constitution: history, interpretation, and practice, New York: Columbia University Press, pp. 365–378, ISBN 9780231128933
- Mansbridge, Jane J (2003), "Consensus in context: a guide for social movements", in Coy, Patrick G (ed.), Consensus decision making, Northern Ireland, and indigenous movements, vol. 24, Amsterdam Boston Oxford: JAI Press/Elsevier Science, pp. 229–253, ISBN 9780762307876
- Mansbridge, Jane J (2004), "Pluralism and the common good", in O'Brien Steinfels, Margaret (ed.), American Catholics and civic engagement: a distinctive voice, vol. 1, Lanham: Rowman & Littlefield Publisher, pp. 19–25, ISBN 9780742531598

2005 - 2009

- Mansbridge, Jane J; Karpowitz, Christopher F. (2005), "Disagreement and consensus: the importance of dynamic updating in public deliberation", in Gastil, John; Levine, Peter (eds.), The deliberative democracy handbook: strategies for effective civic engagement in the twenty-first century, San Francisco: Jossey-Bass, pp. 237–253, ISBN 9780787976613
- Mansbridge, Jane J (2006), "Conflict and self-interest in deliberation", in Besson, Samantha; Marti, José L (eds.), Deliberative democracy and its discontents, Aldershot, Hants, England and Burlington, Vermont: Ashgate, pp. 107–132, ISBN 9780754626275
- Mansbridge, Jane J (2007), "Deliberative democracy or democratic deliberation?", in Rosenberg, Shawn W (ed.), Deliberation, participation and democracy: can the people govern?, Basingstoke England New York: Palgrave Macmillan, pp. 251–271, ISBN 9780230517356
- Mansbridge, Jane J (2008), "Carole Pateman: radical liberal?", in O'Neill, Daniel I; Shanley, Mary L; Young, Iris M (eds.), Illusion of consent engaging with Carole Pateman, University Park, Pennsylvania: Pennsylvania State University Press, pp. 17–30, ISBN 9780271033518
- Mansbridge, Jane J; Hartz-Karp, Janette; Amengual, Matthew; Gastil, John (2008), "Thinking about empowered participatory governance", in Susskind, Lawrence E; Crump, Larry (eds.), Multiparty negotiation, vol. 2 of 4, Thousand Oaks, California and London: Sage, ISBN 9781412948128
- Mansbridge, Jane J (2009), "On the free rider problem", in King, Gary; Schlozman, Kay L; Nie, Norman H (eds.), The future of political science: 100 perspectives, New York: Routledge, pp. 217–219, ISBN 9780415997010

2010 onwards

- Mansbridge, Jane J; Okin, Susan (2012), "Feminism", in Goodin, Robert E; Pettit, Philip; Pogge, Thomas (eds.), A companion to contemporary political philosophy, vol. 2 (second ed.), Chichester: Wiley-Blackwell, pp. 332–359, ISBN 9781444350876
- Mansbridge, Jane J; Parkinson, John; et al. (2012), "A systematic approach to deliberative democracy", in Mansbridge, Jane J; Parkinson, John (eds.), Deliberative systems, Cambridge: Cambridge University Press, pp. 1–26, ISBN 9781107025394

== Journal articles ==
1973 - 1979

- Mansbridge, Jane (March 1973). "Time, emotion, and inequality: three problems of participatory groups". Journal of Applied Behavioral Science. 9 (2–3): 351–368. doi:10.1177/002188637300900217. S2CID 143066857.
- Mansbridge, Jane (May 1973). "Town meeting democracy". Working Papers for a New Society. 1 (5–15): 148–167. ISSN 0091-1615.
- Mansbridge, Jane (Winter 1976). "Conflict in a New England Town Meeting". The Massachusetts Review. 17 (4): 631–663. JSTOR 25088680. Massachusetts review archive
- Mansbridge, Jane (July 1977). "Acceptable inequalities". British Journal of Political Science. 7 (3): 321–336. doi:10.1017/S0007123400001010.

1980 - 1989

- Mansbridge, Jane (April 1981). "Living with conflict: representation in the theory of adversary democracy". Ethics. 91 (3): 466–476. doi:10.1086/292254. JSTOR 2380797. S2CID 145777667.
- Mansbridge, Jane (December 1984). "Who's in charge here? Decision by accretion and gatekeeping in the struggle for the ERA". Politics & Society. 13 (4): 343–382. doi:10.1177/003232928401300401. S2CID 153562883.
- Mansbridge, Jane (Summer 1985). "Myth and reality: the ERA and the gender gap in the 1980 election". Public Opinion Quarterly. 49 (2): 164–178. doi:10.1086/268912.
- Mansbridge, Jane; Manin, Bernard; Stein, Elly (August 1987). "On legitimacy and political deliberation". Political Theory. 15 (3): 338–368. doi:10.1177/0090591787015003005. S2CID 146669499.
- Mansbridge, Jane (Winter 1989). "Symbolic feminism". Salmagundi. 81 (81): 200–212. JSTOR 40548038.
- Mansbridge, Jane (December 1989). "Love and duty: the new frontiers". Behavioral and Brain Sciences. 12 (4): 717. doi:10.1017/S0140525X00025474.

1990 - 1999

- Mansbridge, Jane (1990). "Hard decisions". QQ: Report from the Institute for Philosophy and Public Policy. 10: 2–4.
- Mansbridge, Jane (February 1990). "Self-interest in political life". Political Theory. 18 (1): 132–153. doi:10.1177/0090591790018001007. S2CID 144547971.
- Mansbridge, Jane; Tate, Katherine (September 1992). "Race trumps gender: the Thomas nomination in the black community". PS: Political Science & Politics. 25 (3): 488–492. doi:10.2307/419439. JSTOR 419439. S2CID 155019027.
- Mansbridge, Jane (December 1994). "Using power/fighting power". Constellations. 1 (1): 53–73. doi:10.1111/j.1467-8675.1994.tb00004.x. and also in * Mansbridge, Jane (1994). "Using power/fighting power (Hebrew translation)". Zmanim. XIII.
- Mansbridge, Jane (December 1994). "Using power/fighting power". Constellations. 1 (1): 53–73. doi:10.1111/j.1467-8675.1994.tb00004.x.
- Mansbridge, Jane (Spring 1995). "Does participation make better citizens?". The Good Society. 5 (2): 1–7. ISSN 1089-0017. JSTOR 20710680.
- Mansbridge, Jane (March 1995). "Rational choice gains by losing". Political Psychology. 16 (1): 137–155. doi:10.2307/3791453. JSTOR 3791453.
- Mansbridge, Jane (January 1997). "Taking coercion seriously". Constellations. 3 (3): 407–416. doi:10.1111/j.1467-8675.1997.tb00068.x.
- Mansbridge, Jane (August 1999). "Should blacks represent blacks and women represent women? A contingent "yes"". The Journal of Politics. 61 (3): 628–657. doi:10.2307/2647821. JSTOR 2647821. S2CID 37133536.

2000 - 2009

- Mansbridge, Jane (December 2000). "Feminism and democracy". The American Prospect. 1 (1). The American Prospect - online.
- Mansbridge, Jane (November 2003). "Anti-statism and difference feminism in international social movements". International Feminist Journal of Politics. 5 (3): 355–360. doi:10.1080/1461674032000122713. S2CID 24325142.
- Mansbridge, Jane (December 2003). "Rethinking representation". American Political Science Review. 97 (4): 515–527. doi:10.1017/S0003055403000856. S2CID 210059562.
- Mansbridge, Jane (Autumn 2004). "Representation revisited: introduction to the case against electoral accountability". Democracy and Society. 2 (1). Georgetown University: 1–13. Archived from the original on 2015-01-06. Pdf.
- Mansbridge, Jane; Karpowitz, Christopher F (2005). "Disagreement and consensus: the need for dynamic updating in public deliberation". Journal of Public Deliberation. 1 (1). Deliberative Democracy Consortium: 348–364. Pdf.
- Mansbridge, Jane; Flaster, Katherine (2005). "Male chauvinist, feminist, sexist, and sexual harassment: different trajectories in feminist linguistic innovation". American Speech. 80 (3): 256–279. CiteSeerX 10.1.1.103.8136. doi:10.1215/00031283-80-3-256. Pdf.
- Mansbridge, Jane (2005). "The fallacy of tightening the reins". Österreichische Zeitschrift für Politikwissenschaft. 34 (3). Österreichische Gesellschaft für Politikwissenschaft (ÖGPW): 233–247. Archived from the original on 2013-05-12.
- Mansbridge, Jane (September 2005). "Cracking through hegemonic ideology: the logic of formal justice". Social Justice Research. 18 (3): 335–347. doi:10.1007/s11211-005-6828-0. S2CID 143999366.
- Mansbridge, Jane (December 2005). "Quota problems: combating the dangers of essentialism". Politics & Gender. 1 (4): 621–638. doi:10.1017/S1743923X05220196. S2CID 143605326.
- Mansbridge, Jane; Hartz-Karp, Janette; Amengual, Matthew; Gastil, John (2006). "Norms of deliberation: an inductive study". Journal of Public Deliberation. 2 (1). Deliberative Democracy Consortium: 1–47.
- Mansbridge, Jane (2007). "Conflicto y autointerés en la deliberación". Revista Argentina de Teoría Jurídica. 10 (1). Universidad Torcuato di Tella. Spanish translation of: Mansbridge, Jane J (2006), "Conflict and self-interest in deliberation", in Besson, Samantha; Marti, José L (eds.), Deliberative democracy and its discontents, Aldershot, Hants, England and Burlington, Vermont: Ashgate, pp. 107–132, ISBN 9780754626275
- Mansbridge, Jane (Winter 2007). "Self-interest in deliberation". Kettering Review. 25 (2). Kettering Foundation: 62–72. Archived from the original on 2014-04-18. PDF version.
- Mansbridge, Jane; Shames, Shauna L (December 2008). "Toward a theory of backlash: dynamic resistance and the central role of power". Politics and Gender. 4 (04): 623–634. CiteSeerX 10.1.1.455.440. doi:10.1017/S1743923X08000500. S2CID 13814344.
- Mansbridge, Jane (April 2009). "Deliberative and non-deliberative negotiations". Harvard Kennedy School Working Papers RWP09-010. Harvard Kennedy School Faculty Research Working Paper Series.
- Mansbridge, Jane (December 2009). "A selection model of political representation". Journal of Political Philosophy. 17 (4): 369–398. doi:10.1111/j.1467-9760.2009.00337.x. S2CID 154380187.

2010 onwards

- Mansbridge, Jane; Bohman, James; Chambers, Simone; Estlund, David; Føllesdal, Andreas; Fung, Archon; Lafont, Cristina; Manin, Bernard; Martí, José L (March 2010). "The place of self-interest and the role of power in deliberative democracy". Journal of Political Philosophy. 18 (1): 64–100. doi:10.1111/j.1467-9760.2009.00344.x. S2CID 145163667.
- Mansbridge, Jane (2012). Everyday activism (definition). Wiley. doi:10.1002/9780470674871.wbespm086. ISBN 9781405197731.
- Mansbridge, Jane (March 2014). "What is political science for?". Perspectives on Politics. 12 (1): 8–17. doi:10.1017/S153759271300368X. S2CID 154424952.
