= Political Behavior (journal) =

- Discipline: Political science
- Language: English
- Edited by: Christopher Karpowitz & Jessica Preece

Publication details
- History: 1979–present
- Publisher: Springer Science+Business Media (United States)
- Frequency: Quarterly
- Impact factor: 3.3 (2023)

Standard abbreviations
- ISO 4: Political Behav.

Indexing
- ISSN: 0190-9320 (print); 1573-6687 (web)
- LCCN: 79644232
- JSTOR: 01909320
- OCLC no.: 51205417

Links
- Journal homepage; Online access; Online archive

Political Behavior is a quarterly peer-reviewed academic journal published by Springer Science+Business Media covering political behavior, institutions, processes and policies. The editors-in-chief are Christopher Karpowitz and Jessica Preece, both of Brigham Young University.

== Abstracting and indexing ==
- Current Contents/Social & Behavioural Sciences
- EBSCO databases
- International Political Science Abstracts
- ProQuest databases
- PsycINFO
- Scopus
- Social Sciences Citation Index

According to the Journal Citation Reports, the journal has a 2023 impact factor of 3.3.

== See also ==
- List of political science journals
