= Lawrence High School (Kansas) =

Location
- 1901 Louisiana Street; Lawrence, Kansas 66046; United States; 38.949085°N 95.242871°W

Information
- School type: Public, High School
- Established: 1857, 1954 (current building)
- School district: Lawrence USD 497
- CEEB code: 171690
- Principal: Quentin Rials
- Teaching staff: 99.82 (FTE)
- Grades: 9 to 12
- Gender: coed
- Enrollment: 1,454 (2024–2025)
- Student to teacher ratio: 14.57
- Campus type: Urban
- Colors: Red and black
- Song: We Hail Thee Lawrence High School
- Fight song: Stand Up and Cheer
- Athletics: Class 6A
- Mascot: Chesty the Lion
- Rivals: Free State, Topeka
- Newspaper: The Budget
- Yearbook: The Red and Black
- Website: lhs.usd497.org

Lawrence High School (LHS) is a public secondary school in Lawrence, Kansas, United States, operated by Lawrence USD 497 school district, and serves students of grades 9 to 12. The school is one of the two public high schools located in the city. Lawrence High enrolled 1,575 students in the 2020–2021 school year. The school colors are red and black and the mascot is the "Chesty Lion".

Lawrence is a member of the Kansas State High School Activities Association and offers a variety of sports programs. Athletic teams compete in Class 6A and are known as the "Chesty Lions". Extracurricular activities are also offered in the form of performing arts, school publications, and clubs. Throughout its history, Lawrence High has won more state championships in athletics than any other high school in the state of Kansas.

== History ==
The school originated in 1857 and was referred to as "Quincy School". The first classes were held in the basement of a Unitarian church located at 906 Kentucky Street. Three years later, the city of Lawrence chartered a public school system, which was located at 15th and Massachusetts, which is the current site of Liberty Memorial Central Middle School. Construction of the original building for the school was completed in 1865. In 1946, Paul Coker designed the "Chesty Lion" logo. He would go on to become a famous cartoonist with works appearing in Mad magazine, and on Hallmark Cards products, and is also the original author of the "Frosty the Snowman" character.

The high school occupied a succession of buildings until the opening of the present campus, at 19th and Louisiana Streets, in 1954. The building was expanded repeatedly over the ensuing forty years, as the school district struggled to keep pace with the growth of Lawrence's population. Finally, in 1997, a second public high school, Lawrence Free State High School, was opened, ending the city's long record of all students being educated in a single high school. In 2009, the school finished construction of a new football stadium on the school campus. In 2021, a major remodel was completed, bringing the building up to 21st century standards.

== Athletics ==
The Chesty Lions compete in the Sunflower League and are classified as a 6A school, the largest classification in Kansas according to the Kansas State High School Activities Association. Throughout its history, Lawrence has won more state championships than any other high school in the state. Many graduates have gone on to participate in collegiate and professional athletics including former KU All-Americans Danny Manning, John Hadl and Paul Endacott.

=== Championships ===
Currently Lawrence High has 111 state championships in various sports, one of the highest totals in the nation. The first state championship was won in 1914 in boys basketball. The next title in basketball was 1948, when the Lions defeated Newton 39–36 in the state final. This started a half century of athletic achievements by the Chesty Lions. From 1954 to 2009 the Lions added 104 more state titles, bringing their total to 105. In 2008, Sports Illustrated listed Lawrence High School as the top high school athletics program in Kansas. Additionally, due to the success of Lawrence High and the University of Kansas, Lawrence was featured as a candidate for Titletown, United States by ESPN.

==== Football ====
The Lawrence High School Chesty Lions have 31 undefeated seasons in football, the most in the United States. Additionally, the Chesty Lions won a High School Football National Championship in 1960. The Chesty Lions won five consecutive Kansas State High School Activities Association state championships in Class 6A, the state's largest, from 1989 through 1993. The record was broken by Hutchinson High School in 2009. From 1930 to 2008, games were played at Haskell Memorial Stadium. Following completion of the new football stadium on the Lawrence High campus, the football team began playing games on the new stadium in 2009.

=== State championships ===
Lawrence High has won the following state championships:

State Championships
| Season | Sport | Number of Championships | Year |
|---|---|---|---|
| Fall | Football | 28 | 1914^, 1919^, 1927^, 1928^, 1945^, 1946^, 1947^{+}, 1952^{+}, 1956^{+}, 1957^{+}, 1958^{+}, 1959^{+}, 1960^{+}, 1962^{+}, 1963^{+}, 1964^{+}, 1966^{+}, 1968^{+}, 1979, 1984, 1986, 1987, 1989, 1990, 1991, 1992, 1993, 1995 |
| Fall | Cross Country, Boys | 2 | 2008, 2009 |
| Fall | Cross Country, Girls | 3 | 1985, 1986, 1987 |
| Fall | Volleyball | 16 | 1975, 1976, 1977, 1978, 1979, 1980, 1983, 1984, 1985, 1989, 1990, 1991, 1992, 1994, 1995, 2018 |
| Fall | Gymnastics, Girls | 3 | 2004, 2005, 2006 |
| Fall | Gymnastics, Boys | 21 | 1960, 1961, 1962, 1964, 1965, 1966, 1967, 1968, 1969, 1970, 1971, 1972, 1973, 1974, 1979, 1980, 1981, 1983, 1984, 1986, 1988 |
| Winter | Basketball, Boys | 4 | 1914, 1948, 1983, 1995 |
| Winter | Basketball, Girls | 3 | 1984, 1992, 2008 |
| Winter | Swimming, Boys | 1 | 1997 |
| Winter | Indoor Track, Girls | 2 | 1977, 1978 |
| Spring | Golf, Boys | 1 | 1983 |
| Spring | Golf, Girls | 4 | 1975, 1977, 1982, 1984 |
| Spring | Tennis, Boys | 2 | 1981, 1995 |
| Spring | Tennis, Girls | 1 | 1989 |
| Spring | Baseball | 3 | 1996, 2000, 2009 |
| Spring | Softball | 1 | 1977 |
| Spring | Swimming, Girls | 8 | 1986, 1989, 1990, 1991, 1992, 1993, 1994, 2018 |
| Spring | Track and Field, Boys | 5 | 1989, 1990, 1991, 1997, 2006 |
| Spring | Track and Field, Girls | 5 | 1978, 1979, 2015, 2018, 2019 |
| Total | | 111 | |

^ predates KSHSAA playoffs and AP poll
^{+}predates KSHSAA playoffs; ranked #1 in final AP poll

== Extracurricular activities ==
The school offers a total of 20 clubs. Notable clubs include Fellowship of Christian Athletes, Future Farmers of America (FFA), Key Club, Science Olympiad, and Scholar's Bowl.

== Notable alumni ==
- Beatrice Belkin, soprano
- David Booth, CEO of Dimensional Fund Advisors, namesake for David Booth Kansas Memorial Stadium, the home stadium for the University of Kansas football team
- Corinne Brinkerhoff, television producer and writer
- Erin Brockovich, had a movie made about her when she helped a town win a $333 million lawsuit because Pacific Gas and Electric Company had contaminated their water supply
- Sara Buxton, singer/songwriter
- Paul Coker, animator, creator of the Chesty Lion mascot
- Robert Docking, 38th Governor of Kansas
- Paul Endacott, led the Kansas Jayhawks to consecutive Helms Foundation national championships in 1922 and 1923
- Bart D. Ehrman, Bible scholar
- John Hadl, former professional American football player and All-American quarterback at KU
- Ralph Houk, 1938 Graduate, former Major League Baseball player, manager and general manager. Associated with New York Yankees, Detroit Tigers, Boston Red Sox.
- Steve Jeltz, Major League Baseball player
- Patty Jenkins, film director
- Christopher Karpowitz, political scientist
- Larry Kwak, cancer researcher, named one of the Most Influential People in the world by Time Magazine in 2010
- Danny Manning, former professional basketball player who led the University of Kansas to the 1988 NCAA Men's Division I Basketball Tournament championship
- Zeke Mayo, basketball player
- Brian McClendon, Google Earth creator, and Democratic Nominee for Secretary of State of Kansas in 2018
- Bryce Montes de Oca, professional baseball player
- Alan Mulally, former Ford Motors CEO
- John B. Nalbandian, Judge, United States Court of Appeals for the Sixth Circuit
- Devin Neal, NFL running back for the New Orleans Saints
- Sara Paretsky, author
- Ned Ryun, conservative activist and the founder and CEO of American Majority
- Bucky Scribner, former NFL punter for the Minnesota Vikings and Green Bay Packers
- Kannon Shanmugam, Supreme Court litigator
- Caleb Stegall, Justice, Kansas Supreme Court
- Sri Srinivasan, Judge, United States Court of Appeals for the District of Columbia Circuit
- Robby Steinhardt, former member of the band Kansas
- Adam H. Sterling, former U.S. Ambassador to Slovakia
- Jeff Yagher, American actor
