= Bethany Albertson =

American political psychologist

- Spouse: Josh
- Children: 1

Academic background
- Education: B.A., Political Science, 1999, Loyola Marymount University; M.A, 2001, PhD., Political Science, 2006, University of Chicago
- Thesis: Mysterious ways: the mechanisms of religious persuasion in American politics (2006)

Academic work
- Institutions: University of Texas at Austin; University of Washington
- Notable works: Anxious Politics: Democratic Citizenship in a Threatening World

Bethany Lee Albertson is an American political psychologist. She is an associate professor of political science at the University of Texas at Austin. Her co-authored book Anxious Politics: Democratic Citizenship in a Threatening World received the Robert E. Lane Award for being the best book in political psychology published in 2015.

== Education ==
Albertson attended Loyola Marymount University for her Bachelor of Arts degree in 1999, earning a Hansard Fellowship. She moved to Chicago to earn her Master's degree and PhD at the University of Chicago.

== Career ==
Albertson joined the department of political science at the University of Washington as an assistant professor in 2006. During her tenure at the school, she taught courses in American politics, voting and elections, and political psychology. She also analyzed data prior to the 2008 United States presidential election of Barack Obama with psychology professor Anthony Greenwald. Together, they found that data from the Implicit Association Test was not a consistent or reliable representation of Democratic voters. Albertson spent three years at the University of Washington before moving to Texas to live with her recently tenured husband, Josh, and their son.

Albertson joined the faculty at the University of Texas at Austin as an assistant professor but was worried about her chances at tenure during her 3rd year review. In 2014, Albertson received the Josefina Paredes Endowed Teaching Award and the Society for Political Methodology's Harold F. Gosnell Prize. The following year, she co-published a book with Shana Kushner Gadarian titled Anxious Politics: Democratic Citizenship in a Threatening World, which detailed how anxiety can influence political elections. They found that when a threat is present, citizens tend to rely on government officials as "experts" and vote towards bills that are focused on protecting against said threat. Beyond acts of terrorism, they also examined how the 2009 swine flu pandemic and the fictional smallpox outbreak, which they later re-examined in a modern context during the COVID-19 pandemic. Their book received the Robert E. Lane Award for being the best book in political psychology published in 2015. She was eventually promoted to associate professor and awarded tenure in 2016.
