= Women Also Know Stuff =

Database of women in political science

- Formation: March 2016
- Founder: Samara Klar
- Type: Non-profit organization
- Website: https://womenalsoknowstuff.com/

Women Also Know Stuff is an organization that promotes the work of women in political science. It seeks to help journalists find women experts in political science to interview for news stories, since men are featured in political science-related news media disproportionately often. Since 2016, Women Also Know Stuff has maintained a searchable online database of women political scientists, in order to assist journalists in identifying women to interview as expert sources. By 2020, that database contained approximately 2,000 experts. The database entries contain an individual's affiliation, title, areas of expertise, publications, and previous media appearances.

== History and motivation ==
Media representation of political scientists most often comes in the form of news stories that quote experts on topics related to political science, and there is consensus that these experts are disproportionately men, even as the number of women in political science has increased. For example, from March 2015 to March 2016, 80% of the experts quoted on political science topics by The New York Times were men, and over a similar period Media Matters for America found that 75% of foreign affairs and national security commentators on prime time cable and Sunday shows were men. In February 2016, Samara Klar, then an assistant professor of political science at the University of Arizona, sent an email to a group of political scientists with the idea to crowdsource a website that lists women political scientists. The founders of the organization posited that the reason that news articles disproportionately cite men is that journalists and producers on a deadline have to rely on a highly homogeneous network of experts; a database could therefore facilitate quickly finding women experts whom the journalists might not yet know.

By September of 2016, the Women Also Know Stuff database listed more than 1,000 scholars. In mid-2018 it had increased to 1,650 people, and by the end of 2019 it contained approximately 2,000.

The Women Also Know Stuff database began as a crowdsourced effort, but later switched to a format in which individuals have to sign themselves up. Since 2016, Women Also Know Stuff has focused on expanding coverage of women experts in political science topics or subfields where it did not have as much information, including a focus in 2017 on expanding coverage of international political science.

In addition to its goal of helping to make expert interviews and sources in news stories more equitable, the Women Also Know Stuff database aims to help professors create more equitable syllabi, and to help organizers of academic conferences find potential panelists. Women Also Know Stuff also manages a Twitter feed on which it features the accomplishments of women in political science.

In response to these efforts to make it easier for journalists to identify women who are experts on political science topics, the journalist Amanda Taub has argued that the underrepresentation of women as experts in reporting is caused by deeper problems than journalists simply not knowing of female experts to interview, and should instead be attributed to structural issues in who becomes an expert. The Women Also Know Stuff team have argued that each is a cause and a consequence of the other: the underrepresentation of women as experts in stories about politics causes structural problems for women in political science, which in turn causes the underrepresentation of women as experts in media.

== Related efforts ==
Multiple groups have explicitly cited Women Also Know Stuff as the source of the idea to form a related group in a different discipline or with a different focus. In 2018, the historians who formed the database of women historians called Women Also Know History attributed the idea for their group to Women Also Know Stuff. People of Color Also Know Stuff, an organization focused on building a database like the Women Also Know Stuff database but for political scientists of color, was founded in late 2019. Women Also Know Stuff has also inspired similar projects in other languages, such as Las Mujeres También Saben.

Women Also Know Stuff has been linked with 500 Women Scientists and its "Request a Woman Scientist" program, as well as the University of Venus program and other similar efforts founded around the same time like Women Are Boring.
