= Women Are Boring =

Online academic news website

- Website type: Research periodical
- Available in: English
- Creators: Grace McDermott; Catherine Connolly
- Website: womenareboring.wordpress.com
- Commercial: No
- Launched: 2016; 10 years ago

Women Are Boring is an online publication featuring research by women. It aims to improve the visibility of women researchers, in response to the poor representation of discoveries by women in media outlets that quote or cover academic research. Women Are Boring is primarily a platform for women to post summaries or synopses of research that they have published in a different venue, on any topic.

== History and motivation ==
Grace McDermott and Catherine Connolly founded the publication while they were PhD students at Dublin City University in May of 2016. McDermott and Connolly attributed their decision to found Women Are Boring to the under-representation of women in media, and particularly the underrepresentation of women scholars in news about research. They were specifically motivated by a study by The Global Media Monitoring Project which concluded that "only 24% of the persons heard, read about or seen in news media are women", and that only 28% of the sources cited in Irish news media were women, with only a very small proportion of those in expert roles like scientific or academic sources. McDermott and Connolly have noted the contrast between the dearth of women researchers in popular media and the plethora of research by women that they consistently encountered as PhD students.

McDermott and Connolly chose the name "Women Are Boring" for their platform partly to alter the Google Search results for that phrase, which they noted had previously consisted of results that were overwhelmingly demeaning to women. It is also intended to ironically contrast the attitude that women are boring with the interesting information that is shared by women on the platform, to demonstrate the absurdity of the claim that women are boring.

Women Are Boring was founded at a similar time to other efforts to increase the visibility of women academics online and specifically in news media, such as Women Also Know Stuff and 500 Women Scientists. It has also been compared to The Bearded Lady Project, the Athena SWAN Program, and the Dangerous Women Project of International Women's Day 2016.

== Contributions ==
Women Are Boring features research summaries and research contributions from women. Most contributors are academics, but contributions also come from women researchers who do not work in academia. The contributions are specifically meant for a general audience, and are intended to be accessible to any interested reader, rather than appealing exclusively to other researchers. Although founders McDermott and Connolly both studied foreign policy and international affairs, with McDermott studying in the School of Communications and Connolly studying in the School of Law and Government at Dublin City University, there are no restrictions on the topics accepted by Women Are Boring. Shortly after its founding, in July 2016, a Dublin City University news release noted that it had already covered topics including "women in ISIS, gender equality in Northern Ireland and Scotland's health inequalities", and had then received "12,000 views from more than 94 countries". By 2017, about one year after the website's founding, Stellar Magazine reported that Women Are Boring had featured contributions in areas "from US foreign policy to William Shakespeare". Women Are Boring specifically aims to promote interdisciplinary research, and facilitate networking of scholars across traditional disciplinary boundaries.

Women Are Boring does not publish full research papers, but rather features summaries or synopses which link readers to full research projects, a process which has been compared with the research summaries available on Wikipedia. Although the website does not publish full research papers, some original early-stage research contributions to Women Are Boring that were not already published in full elsewhere have subsequently been expanded by their authors and published in peer-reviewed academic journals.
