= Claes de Vreese =

Danish academic

Claes Holger de Vreese (born 25 September 1974, Copenhagen) is a Distinguished University Professor of Artificial Intelligence and Society with a special focus on media and democracy at the University of Amsterdam (UvA).

He is the co-director of AlgoSoc: Public Values in the Algorithmic Society and the AI, Media & Democracy Lab. He founded the Center for Politics and Communication, the Digital Communication Methods Lab, and he served as President of the International Communication Association in 2020-2021.

De Vreese is founding Scientific Director of the Digital Democracy Centre at the University of Southern Denmark (SDU).

Between 2005 and 2013, de Vreese was the Director of ASCoR and the Director of the Netherlands School of Communication Research (NeSCoR).

== Research ==
Research interests of De Vreese include the role of automation, algorithms, and artificial intelligence in democratic processes. This includes microtargeting, news recommenders, social media platforms, disinformation, comparative journalism research, the effects of news, public opinion, and European integration.

In total, De Vreese has published more than 300 articles in peer-reviewed academic journals. Titles include: Communication Research, European Journal of Political Research, European Union Politics, International Journal of Public Opinion Research, Journal of Communication, Journal of Politics, Political Communication, Public Opinion Quarterly, and West European Politics.

From 2014-2020, De Vreese was the Editor in Chief of the international journal Political Communication.

== Grants ==
De Vreese has received grants from international science foundations and EU research programs, including grants from the European Research Council (ERC). In addition, he received the VICI grant and VENI grant from the Netherlands Organisation for Scientific Research (NWO).

== Recognition ==
De Vreese has received several awards for research from the International Communication Association, the Carlsberg Foundation Research Prize, the Holberg Foundation Nils Klim Prize, and the Dutch Science Foundation Stevin Prize , one of the highest recognitions in the Dutch scientific community.

De Vreese is recipient of the International Communication Association Swanson Career Achievement Award and the Netherland Flanders Communication Association (NeFCA) Career Award

De Vreese is an elected Fellow of the Royal Netherlands Academy of Arts and Sciences (KNAW), and an elected Fellow of the Royal Danish Academy of Sciences and Letters. He is also an elected Fellow of the International Communication Association and the Royal Holland Society of Sciences (KHMW).

== Impact ==
De Vreese is a frequent source in media across multiple countries. Examples include the Volkskrant, Nieuwsuur , WNL , Het Parool , TechPolicy.press , RTL , Politiken . De Vreese has key noted in more than a dozen countries including the Netherlands, Denmark, Switzerland, the United States, Hong Kong, Germany, Indonesia, France, Norway and Croatia. In 2026 he was awarded the prestigious Stevin Prize for pathbreaking research with societal relevance and impact.
