= Arthur Lupia =

American political scientist

Arthur Lupia is an American political scientist. He is Senior Vice President and Chief Research Officer at Georgetown University. He was previously the Gerald R. Ford University Professor and Vice President for Research and Innovation at the University of Michigan. Prior to his term as Vice President at the University of Michigan, he served as an Assistant Director of the National Science Foundation and co-chaired the White House Office of Science and Technology Policy Open Science subcommittee. He currently serves on the National Academies of Science, Engineering, and Medicine's Strategic Council for Excellence, Integrity, and Trust and on their Advisory Board for Engineering and the Physical Sciences. Prior to joining NSF, he was Chairperson of the Board of the Center for Open Science and Chair of National Research Council's Roundtable on the Application of Behavioral and Social Science. His research concerns how people make complex decisions and on how organizations build, maintain and lose credibility and capacity. He draws from multiple scientific and philosophical disciplines and uses multiple research methods. His topics of expertise include information processing, persuasion, strategic communication, coalition building, and the public value of science.

== Education and career ==
Lupia received a B.A. degree in economics from the University of Rochester and M.S. and Ph.D. degrees in social science from the California Institute of Technology. He has taught at the University of California, San Diego (1990-2001) and the University of Michigan (2001–2026).

He has held a range of scientific leadership positions. He has served on the Advisory Board of the Division of Behavioral and Social Sciences and Education of the National Academy of Sciences, and as Chair of the Social, Economic, and Political Sciences section of the American Association for the Advancement of Science. He was co-founder of TESS (Time-Sharing Experiments in the Social Sciences), which has helped hundreds of scientists from many disciplines run innovative experiments on opinion formation and change using nationally representative subject pools. As a contributor and then as Principal Investigator to the National Science Foundation's EITM (Empirical Implications of Theoretical Models) program, he helped to develop curricula that show young scholars how to better integrate advanced empirical and theoretical methods into effective research agendas. As a Principal Investigator of the ANES (American National Election Studies), he introduced many procedural, methodological, and content innovations to one of the world's best-known scientific studies of elections.

He has led numerous task forces on scientific communication and research transparency and is regularly asked to advise scientific organizations and research groups on how to effectively communicate science to broad and diverse audiences. He has also led or advised numerous efforts to increase transparency and data availability in scientific publishing. He is an elected member of the American Academy of Arts and Sciences, a Fellow of the American Association for the Advancement of Science, a Guggenheim Fellow, an Andrew Carnegie Fellow, a Fellow at the Center for Advanced Study in the Behavioral Sciences, a recipient of the American Association for Public Opinion Research’s Innovator’s Award, the American Political Science Association’s Ithiel de Sola Pool Award, and the National Academy of Science’s NAS Award for Initiatives in Research.

== Selected publications ==
=== Books ===
- Arthur Lupia and Mathew D. McCubbins. 1998. The Democratic Dilemma: Can Citizens Learn What They Need to Know? New York: Cambridge University Press.
- Arthur Lupia, Mathew D. McCubbins, and Samuel L. Popkin (eds.). 2000. Elements of Reason: Cognition, Choice, and the Bounds of Rationality. New York: Cambridge University Press.
- Elisabeth R. Gerber, Arthur Lupia, Mathew D. McCubbins, and D. Roderick Kiewiet. 2001. Stealing the Initiative: How State Government Responds to Direct Democracy. Upper Saddle River, NJ: Prentice-Hall.
- James N. Druckman, Donald P. Green, James H. Kuklinski, and Arthur Lupia (eds.). 2011. Cambridge Handbook of Experimental Political Science. New York: Cambridge University Press. ISBN 978-0-521-17455-8.
- Arthur Lupia. 2016. Uninformed: Why People Know So Little About Politics and What We Can Do About It." New York: Oxford University Press.

=== Articles on Open Science and Scientific Integrity ===
- Arthur Lupia. 2008. “Procedural Transparency and the Credibility of Election Surveys.” Electoral Studies 27: 732-739.
- Arthur Lupia and Colin Elman. 2014. “Openness in Political Science: Data Access and Research Transparency.” PS: Political Science and Politics 47: 19-42.
- Arthur Lupia and George Alter. 2014. “Data Access and Research Transparency in the Quantitative Tradition.” PS: Political Science and Politics 47: 54-59.
- Brian A. Nosek, George Alter, George C. Banks, Denny Borsboom, Sara D. Bowman, Steven Breckler, Stuart Buck, Christopher Chambers, Gilbert Chin, Garret Christensen, Monica Contestabile, Allan Dafoe, Eric Eich, Jeremy Freese, Rachel Glennerster, Daniel Goroff, Donald P. Green, Brad Hesse, Macartan Humphreys, John Ishiyama, Dean Karlan, Alan Kraut, Arthur Lupia, Patricia Mabry, Temina Madon, Neil Malhotra, Evan MayoWilson, Marcia McNutt, Edward Miguel, Elizabeth Levy Paluck, Uri Simonsohn, Courtney Soderberg, Barbara A. Spellman, James Turitto, Gary VandenBos, Simine Vazire, E. J. Wagenmakers, Rick Wilson, and Tal Yarkoni. 2015. “Promoting an Open Research Culture: Author Guidelines for Journals Could Help to Promote Transparency, Openness, and Reproducibility.” Science 348: 1422-1425.
- Matthew K. Berent, Jon A. Krosnick, and Arthur Lupia. 2016. “Measuring Voter Registration and Turnout in Surveys: Do Official Government Records Yield More Accurate Assessments?" Public Opinion Quarterly 49: 597-621.
- Barbara R. Jasny, Nick Wigginton, Marcia McNutt, Tanya Bubela, Stuart Buck, Robert Cook-Deegan, Timothy Gardner, Brooks Hanson, Carolyn Hustad, Veronique Kiermer, David Lazer, Arthur Lupia, Arjun Manrai, Laura McConnell, Kevin Noonan, Elizabeth Phimster, Brenda Simon, Kathy Strandburg, Zara Summers, and Duncan Watts. “Fostering Reproducibility in Industry-Academia Partnerships.” 2017. Science 357: 759-761.
- Daniel J. Benjamin, James O. Berger, Magnus Johannesson, Brian A. Nosek, EJ Wagenmakers, Richard Berk, Kenneth A. Bollen, Bjorn Brembs, Lawrence Brown, Colin Camerer, David Cesarini, Christopher P. Chambers, Merlise Clyde, Thomas D. Cook, Pul De Boeck, Zoltan Dienes, Anna Dreber, Kenny Easwaran, Charles Efferson, Ernst Fehr, Fiona Fidler, Andy P. Field, Malcolm Forster, Edward I. George, Richard Gonzalez, Steven Goodman, Edwin Green, Donald P. Green, Anthony Greenwald, Jrrod D. Hadfield, Larry V. Hedges, Leonhard Held, Teck Hua Ho, Herbert Hoijtink, James Holland, Daniel J. Hruschka, Kosuke Imai, Guido Imbens, John P. A. Ioannidis, Minjeong Jeon, Michael Kirchler, David Laibson, John List, Roderick Little, Arthur Lupia, Edward Machery, Scott E. Maxwell, Michael McCarthy, Don Moore, Stephen L. Morgan, Marcus Munafo, Shinichi Nakagawa, Brendan Nyhan, Timothy H. Parker, Luis Pericchi, Marco Perugini, Jeff Rouder, Judith Rousseau, Victoria Savalei, Felix D. Schonbrodt, Thomas Sellke, Betsy Sinclair, Dustin Tingley, Trisha Van Zandt, Simine Vazire, Duncan J. Watts, Christopher Winship. Robert L. Wolpert, Yu Xie, Cristobal Young, Jonathan Zinman, and Valen E. Johnson. “Redefine Statistical Significance.” 2018. Nature Human Behaviour 2: 6-10.
- Colin Elman, Diana Kapiszewski, and Arthur Lupia. 2018. “Transparent Social Inquiry: Implications for Political Science.” Annual Review of Political Science 21: 29-47.

=== Articles on the Public Value of Social Science ===
- Arthur Lupia. 2000. "Evaluating Political Science Research: Information for Buyers and Sellers." PS: Political Science and Politics 33: 7-13.
- Arthur Lupia, Ed. 2000. "The Public Value of Political Science Research." PS: Political Science and Politics 33: 2 - 64.
- Arthur Lupia. 2014. “What is the Value of Social Science? Challenges for Researchers and Government Funders.” PS: Political Science and Politics 47: 1-7.
- Arthur Lupia. 2016. “Science Literacy and Civic Engagement: Evidence, Challenges, and Opportunities.” Washington DC: National Academies of Science, Engineering, and Medicine, 32 pp.
- Arthur Lupia. 2017. “Now is the Time: How to Increase the Value of Social Science.” Social Research: An International Quarterly 84: 689-715.

=== Articles on Science Communication ===
- Arthur Lupia. 2013. “Communicating Science in Politicized Environments.” Proceedings of the National Academy of Sciences 110: 14048-14054.
- John H. Aldrich and Arthur Lupia, eds. 2015. “Let’s Be Heard: How to Better Communicate Political Science’s Public Value.” PS: Political Science and Politics: 48: S1-S121.
- John H. Aldrich and Arthur Lupia. 2015. ““How Political Science Can Better Communicate its Value: Twelve Recommendations from the APSA Task Force.” PS: Political Science and Politics 48: S1-S19.

=== Articles on Voting and Individual Behavior ===
- Arthur Lupia. 1992. “Busy Voters, Agenda Control, and the Power of Information.” American Political Science Review 86: 390-403.
- Arthur Lupia. 1994. “Shortcuts versus Encyclopedias: Information and Voting Behavior in California Insurance Reform Elections.” American Political Science Review 88: 63-76.
- James N. Druckman and Arthur Lupia. 2000. "Preference Formation." Annual Review of Political Science 3: 1 - 24.
- Gregory L. Bovitz, James N. Druckman and Arthur Lupia. 2002. "When Can a News Organization Lead Public Opinion? Ideology versus Market Forces in Decisions to Make News." Public Choice 113: 127-155.
- Arthur Lupia. 2002. “Deliberation Disconnected: What it Takes to Improve Civic Competence.” Law and Contemporary Problems 65: 133-150.
- Arthur Lupia and Gisela Sin. 2003. “Which Public Goods are Endangered? How Evolving Communication Technologies Affect The Logic of Collective Action.” Public Choice 117: 315-331.
- Arthur Lupia and Tasha S. Philpot. 2005. “Views From Inside the Net: How Websites Affect Young Adults’ Political Interest” The Journal of Politics 67:1122-1142.
- James N. Druckman, Donald P. Green, James H. Kuklinski, and Arthur Lupia. 2006. “The Growth and Development of Experimental political science|Experimental Research in the American Political Science Review.” American Political Science Review 100: 627-636.
- Arthur Lupia. 2006. "How Elitism Undermines the Study of Voter Competence." Critical Review 18: 217-232.
- Markus Prior and Arthur Lupia. 2008. “Money, Time, and Political Knowledge: Distinguishing Quick Recall from Political Learning Skills.” American Journal of Political Science 52: 168-182.
- Arthur Lupia and Jesse O. Menning. 2009. “When Can Politicians Scare Citizens Into Supporting Bad Policies?” American Journal of Political Science 53: 90-106.
- Arthur Lupia. 2010. “Did Bush Voters Cause Obama's Victory?" PS: Political Science and Politics 43: 239-241.
- Arthur Lupia, Logan S. Casey, Kristyn L. Karl, Spencer Piston, Timothy J. Ryan, and Christopher Skovron. 2015. “What Does it Take to Reduce Racial Prejudice in Individual-Level Candidate Evaluations? A Formal Theoretic Perspective.” Political Science Research and Methods 3:1-20.
- James N. Druckman and Arthur Lupia. 2016. “Preference Change in Competitive Political Environments.” Annual Review of Political Science 19: 13-31.
- Arthur Lupia and Mathew D. McCubbins. 2019. "Democracy's Continuing Dilemma: How to Build Credibility in Chaotic Times." PS: Political Science and Politics 52:654-658.

=== Articles on Legislative Processes ===
- Arthur Lupia and Mathew D. McCubbins. 1994. “Learning From Oversight: Fire Alarms and Police Patrols Reconstructed.” Journal of Law, Economics and Organization 10: 96-125.
- Arthur Lupia and Mathew D. McCubbins. 1994. “Designing Bureaucratic Accountability.” Law and Contemporary Problems 57: 91-126.
- Arthur Lupia and Mathew D. McCubbins. 1994. “Who Controls? Information and the Structure of Legislative Decision Making.” Legislative Studies Quarterly, 19: 361-384.
- Arthur Lupia and Kaare Strøm. 1995. “Coalition Termination and the Strategic Timing of Parliamentary Elections.” American Political Science Review 89: 648-665.
- Elisabeth R. Gerber and Arthur Lupia. 1995. “Campaign Competition and Policy Responsiveness in Direct Legislation Elections.” Political Behavior 17: 287-306.
- Arthur Lupia and Mathew D. McCubbins. 2000. "Representation or Abdication? How Citizens Use Institutions to Help Delegation Succeed." European Journal of Political Research 37: 291 - 307
- John D. Huber and Arthur Lupia. 2001. "Cabinet Instability and Delegation in Parliamentary Democracies." American Journal of Political Science 45: 18-32.
- Arthur Lupia and John G. Matsusaka. 2004. “Direct Democracy: New Approaches to Old Questions.” Annual Review of Political Science 7: 463-482.
- Elisabeth R. Gerber, Arthur Lupia and Mathew D. McCubbins. 2004. “When Does Government Limit the Impact of Voter Initiatives? The Politics of Implementation and Enforcement.” The Journal of Politics 66: 43-68.
- Arthur Lupia, Yanna Krupnikov, Adam Seth Levine, Spencer Piston, and Alexander Von Hagen-Jamar. 2010. “Why State Constitutions Differ in their Treatment of Same-Sex Marriage." The Journal of Politics 72: 1222-1235.
- Gisela Sin and Arthur Lupia. 2013. “How the Senate and President Affect the Timing of Major Rule Changes in the US House of Representatives.” Journal of Law Economics and Organization 29: 1184-1216.
