= Shana Kushner Gadarian =

American political psychologist

- Born: Shana Alyse Kushner; 1979 (age 46–47); Cherry Hill, New Jersey, U.S.
- Occupation: Professor
- Spouse: Michael David Gadarian (m. 2005)

Academic background
- Education: Rutgers University (B.A.); Princeton University (M.A., Ph.D.)
- Thesis: The politics of threat: terrorism, media, and foreign policy opinion (November 2008)
- Doctoral advisor: Tali Mendelberg

Academic work
- Institutions: Syracuse University; University of California, Berkeley; Swarthmore College; Princeton University
- Notable works: Anxious Politics: Democratic Citizenship in a Threatening World
- Website: sgadaria.expressions.syr.edu

Shana Alyse Kushner Gadarian (born 1979) is an American political scientist, political psychologist, and educator. She is the Merle Goldberg Fabian Professor of Excellence in Citizenship and Critical Thinking and Chair of the Department of Political Science at the Maxwell School of Citizenship and Public Affairs of Syracuse University. Her co-authored book Anxious Politics: Democratic Citizenship in a Threatening World received the Robert E. Lane Award for being the best book in political psychology published in 2015.

== Early life and education ==
Gadarian was born to Robin Z. Kushner and Gary J. Kushner in Cherry Hill, New Jersey in 1979. She earned a Bachelor of Arts in political science from Rutgers University in 2002 and M.A. and Ph.D. in political science from Princeton University in 2008. While attending Rutgers University for her bachelor's degree, she met her future husband Michael David Gadarian, whom she married in 2005.

== Career ==
Upon earning her Ph.D., Gadarian accepted a faculty position at Swarthmore College as an instructor. She spent one year there before accepting a three-year fellowship as a Robert Wood Johnson Foundation scholar in health policy at the University of California, Berkeley.

In the fall of 2011, she joined the faculty of political science at Syracuse University as an assistant professor. She earned a Norway Research Council grant to conduct a long-term study of the effect of terrorism on social capital. In the same year, she received the Society for Political Methodology's Harold F. Gosnell Prize with seven other scientists for their project titled Topic Models for Open-Ended Survey Responses with Applications to Experiments.

In 2015, she co-published a book with Bethany Albertson titled Anxious Politics: Democratic Citizenship in a Threatening World, which detailed how anxiety can influence political elections. They found that when a threat is present, citizens tend to rely on government officials as "experts" and vote towards bills that are focused on protecting against said threat. Beyond acts of terrorism, they also examined how the 2009 swine flu pandemic and the fictional smallpox outbreak, which they later re-examined in a modern context during the COVID-19 pandemic. Their book received the Robert E. Lane Award for being the best book in political psychology published in 2015 and she earned the 2015 Daniel Patrick Moynihan Award for Teaching and Research.

In 2017, Gadarian was promoted to associate professor with tenure. She received the 2017 Best Paper Award from the Urban and Local Politics Section of American Political Science Association (APSA) and 2018 Best Paper Award in American Politics from the Midwest Political Science Association.

In 2021, Gadarian was named a Carnegie Fellow, promoted to full professor, and appointed Chair of the Department of Political Science at the Maxwell School. Her Carnegie-funded project, Pandemic Politics: How COVID-19 Revealed the Depths of Partisan Polarization, will investigate the long-term impacts of the pandemic on health behaviors and evaluations of government performance. In 2022, Gadarian's co-authored book, Pandemic Politics: The Deadly Toll of Partisanship in the Age of COVID, was published by the Princeton University Press.

In January 2022, she was named the Merle Goldberg Fabian Professor of Excellence in Citizenship and Critical Thinking.

== Works ==
Gadarian, Shana Kushner; Albertson, Bethany (2015). Anxious Politics: Democratic Citizenship in a Threatening World. Cambridge University Press.
