= Political Communication (journal) =

- Discipline: Political science
- Language: English
- Edited by: Regina G. Lawrence

Publication details
- History: 1980–present
- Publisher: Routledge for the Political Communications divisions of the American Political Science Association and the International Communication Association
- Frequency: Quarterly
- Impact factor: 7.859 (2020)

Standard abbreviations
- ISO 4: Political Commun.

Indexing
- ISSN: 1058-4609 (print); 1091-7675 (web)
- LCCN: 93657031
- OCLC no.: 24298351

Links
- Journal homepage; Online access; Online archive; Archive at IngentaConnect

Political Communication is a quarterly peer-reviewed academic journal covering political communication.

== History ==
It was established in 1980 and is published by Routledge on behalf of the American Political Science Association and the International Communication Association. The editor-in-chief is Claes de Vreese (University of Amsterdam).

According to the Journal Citation Reports, the journal has a 2018 impact factor of 4.339.

== See also ==
- List of political science journals
