= Antoni Kukliński =

Polish academic (1927–2015)

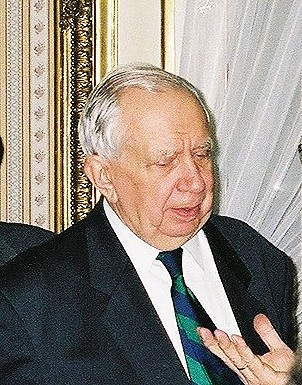
Antoni Kukliński (1997)

Antoni Kukliński (2 June 1927 – 8 August 2015) was a Polish professor of economics specializing in economic geography and research policy. From 1967 to 1971 he was director of regional research program at UNRISD (United Nations Research Institute for Social Development). He was a founder of the Centre for European Regional and Local Studies (EUROREG) at the University of Warsaw, Poland.

In 1999, a collection of 30 papers was published to celebrate Kukliński's work and career.

== Selected works ==
=== Articles ===
| Title | Time of publication | Journal | Volume (Issue) | Page range | Unique identifier | Notes |
|---|---|---|---|---|---|---|
| "Regional Development in Poland-Lessons of Experience" | 1982 | GeoJournal | 6 (3) | 261–269 | JSTOR 41142693 | |
| "Regional Dynamics of Socio-Economic Change — The Experiences and Prospects in Sparsely Populated Areas" | Jan 1986 | GeoJournal | 12 (1) | 107–110 | JSTOR 41143596 | |
| "The Organisation of Space in Historical and Prognostic Perspective" | Jun 1988 | GeoJournal | 16 (4) | 427–429 | JSTOR 41144249 | |
| "The Geography of New Europe" | Aug 1993 | GeoJournal | 30 (4) | 455–462 | JSTOR 41145968 | |
