= Muhammad Kawtharani =

Senior Hezbollah commander

Mohammad al-Kawtharani
- Born: Najaf, Iraq
- Allegiance: Hezbollah
- Rank: Senior commander
- Known for: Coordinating activities of Iran-aligned militias in Iraq
- Conflicts: Iraq War, Syrian Civil War, Iraqi insurgency (2017–present)

Sheikh Mohammad Hussein Al-Kawtharani (born between 1945 and 1961) is a Lebanese born senior commander in Hezbollah and its liaison to Iraq, known for coordinating the activities of Iran-aligned paramilitary groups. His influence grew significantly after the death of Qasem Soleimani, the former commander of the Quds Force, who was killed in a U.S. drone strike in January 2020. Following Soleimani's death, al-Kawtharani reportedly took over some of the responsibilities for coordinating political and military actions of the pro-Iran militias in Iraq.

Born in Najaf to Lebanese parents from the village of Al-Ghassaniyah, Lebanon, al-Kawtharani studied in the city and has long been a key player in Hezbollah's operations in Iraq. He is known to be fluent in Iraqi Arabic and is married to an Iraqi woman, which has helped him navigate Iraq's political and military landscape. His rise in prominence came after the 2003 U.S.-led invasion of Iraq, when he was appointed to oversee Hezbollah's operations in the country. Al-Kawtharani frequently traveled between Baghdad and Beirut and worked closely with Iraqi leaders, particularly during times of political instability.

== Designation by the United States ==
The U.S. State Department designated al-Kawtharani as a "global terrorist" in 2013 for his role in providing funding and logistical support to armed Iraqi groups. In 2020, the U.S. government offered a $10 million reward for information on al-Kawtharani's activities and associates, aiming to disrupt Hezbollah's operations in Iraq. Al-Kawtharani is believed to be responsible for coordinating militias involved in attacks on foreign diplomatic missions and widespread criminal activities.

Al-Kawtharani has also been involved in Iraqi politics, mediating between factions and maintaining influence over various Shiite groups. His expertise in Iraqi affairs has led some to compare him to Soleimani, though his profile is lower. Despite the U.S. targeting al-Kawtharani, some sources have raised concerns that this attention could precede an attempt on his life, similar to the assassination of Soleimani.

== Designation by Saudi Arabia ==
In November 2015, the Kingdom of Saudi Arabia designated Mohammad al-Kawtharani, along with other Hezbollah figures, as a terrorist for his role in supporting Hezbollah's activities across the Middle East. The Saudi Ministry of Interior announced the designation as part of the country's ongoing efforts to combat terrorism and its financing, targeting individuals and entities associated with Hezbollah.

According to the Saudi government, al-Kawtharani was involved in activities that contributed to regional instability, including providing arms to groups outside Lebanon and supporting Hezbollah's broader military and political agenda. The designation was made in relation to Royal Decree A/44, which regulates crimes of terrorism and terrorist financing. This decree allows for the freezing of assets and prohibits Saudi citizens from engaging in any dealings with those classified by Saudi Arabia as "terrorists", including al-Kawtharani.
