= The Race Card (book) =

The Race Card: Campaign Strategy, Implicit Messages, and the Norm of Equality
- Author: Tali Mendelberg
- Language: English
- Publisher: Princeton University Press
- Publication date: April 1, 2001
- Publication place: United States
- ISBN: 0-691-07071-7

The Race Card: Campaign Strategy, Implicit Messages, and the Norm of Equality, is a book written by American author Tali Mendelberg. In this book, she examines how and when politicians play the race card and then manage to plausibly deny doing so. She argues that politicians routinely evoke racial stereotypes, fears, and resentments without voters' awareness. The book argues that politicians sometimes resort to subtle uses of race to win elections.

== Awards ==
- 2002: Woodrow Wilson Foundation Award, American Political Science Association

=== Samples of the text ===
1. Sample 1
2. Sample 2
3. Sample 3

=== Reviews ===
1. Princeton review
2. Powells review
