= John D. Huber =

American political scientist

Academic background
- Education: Lawrence University (BA); University of Rochester (PhD)

Academic work
- Discipline: Comparative politics
- Institutions: Ohio State University; University of Michigan; Columbia University

John D. Huber is an American political scientist who specializes in studying democratic processes and institutions. He is a professor of political science at Columbia University.

== Biography ==
Huber received his B.A. from Lawrence University and Ph.D. from the University of Rochester. He taught at Ohio State University and University of Michigan before joining the Columbia University faculty in 1998.

Huber served as Chair of Columbia's department of political science from 2006 to 2009, and from 2010 to 2013. He was also the interim director of the Institute for Social and Economic Research and Policy from 2012 to 2013. His research focuses on the comparative study of democratic processes as well as ethnic politics and how it affects redistribution.

He was elected a fellow of the American Academy of Arts and Sciences in 2013.
