= Christopher Karpowitz =

American political scientist

Christopher F. Karpowitz
- Born: January 13, 1969 (age 57); Lawrence, Kansas, U.S.
- Education: Princeton University
- Awards: 2012 American Political Science Association (APSA) Best Paper Award: Political Psychology Section (co-author)
- Scientific career
- Fields: Political science
- Workplaces: Brigham Young University

Christopher F. Karpowitz (born January 13, 1969) is an associate professor of political science at Brigham Young University. He is also an associate director of Brigham Young University's Center for the Study of Elections and Democracy.

He co-authored The Silent Sex: Gender, Deliberation, and Institutions with Tali Mendelberg.

== Early life ==
Christopher F. Karpowitz is the son of Dennis and Diane Karpowitz and he attended Lawrence High School, in Kansas.

== Education ==
Karpowitz gained his degree in political science and his masters in American studies from Brigham Young University. He studied for a certificate of graduate studies in political theory at Duke University, and gained his masters and PhD in American politics at Princeton University.

== Writings and research ==
Karpowitz was a contributor to The New York Times "Room for Debate" section of writings in 2011 on whether Americans were ready for a Mormon president.

His findings that women speak less in male dominated groups have been widely reported on. He and Mendelberg have also had op-ed articles published in a wide variety of newspapers. He has also done extensive research on the effects of caucuses verses primaries. He also has been solicited by various national publications for comments on political situations in Utah.

== Awards ==
- 2012 Best Paper Award: Political Psychology Section from APSA (with Tali Mendelberg)

== Books ==
- Macedo, Stephen; Karpowitz, Christopher; et al. (2005). Democracy at risk how political choices undermine citizen participation and what we can do about it. Washington, D.C.: Brookings Institution Press. ISBN 9780815754053.
- Karpowitz, Christopher F.; Mendelberg, Tali (2014), The silent sex: gender, deliberation, and institutions, Princeton, New Jersey: Princeton University Press, ISBN 9780691159768

== See also ==
- Deliberative democracy
- Feminist philosophy
- Feminist theory
- Political philosophy
