= Matthew Levendusky =

American political scientist

Matthew S. Levendusky (born c. 1979) is an American political scientist, best known for his 2009 book The Partisan Sort: How Liberals Became Democrats and Conservatives Became Republicans. His work has primarily focused on explaining political polarization, but also includes media analyses and topics related to public opinion and American foreign policy. Levendusky is currently Professor of political science and communication at the University of Pennsylvania.

== Background ==
Levendusky was raised in Pittsburgh, Pennsylvania, later attending Pennsylvania State University, where he graduated with a degree in political science in 2001. After graduating, he entered the political science PhD program at Stanford University. He was a runner-up for a National Science Foundation grant to attend Stanford, where he obtained a Ph.D. in political science. After completing his dissertation in 2006, Levendusky spent a year as a postdoctoral research associate at Yale University in the Center for the Study of American Politics in the Institution for Social and Policy Studies. Levendusky began working at the University of Pennsylvania as an assistant professor in the political science department in 2007.

== The Partisan Sort ==
The Partisan Sort: How Liberals Became Democrats and Conservatives Became Republicans, is a book on the phenomenon of growing political polarization in the United States. Levendusky finds that while a small number have become more extreme over time, most contemporary Americans maintain relatively similar views to those in previous generations. What has changed is the way people sort themselves into parties. Previously, many liberals identified as Republicans and many conservatives identified as Democrats. More recently, the parties have become more ideologically pure and encouraged people to think of themselves in that way as well. Thus, voters have been "sorting" into Democrats and Republicans and eliminated much of the middle ground that existed in previous generations.

Reception for the book was positive.

== Bibliography ==
=== Journal articles ===
- “Measuring District Level Partisanship with Implications for the Analysis of U.S. Elections”, co-authored with Jeremy Pope and Simon D. Jackman, The Journal of Politics (2008)
- “Drafting Support for War: Conscription and Mass Support for Warfare”, The Journal of Politics (2011)
- “Rethinking the Role of Political Information”, Public Opinion Quarterly (2011)
- “Red States vs. Blue States: Going Beyond the Mean”, Public Opinion Quarterly (2011)
- “Why Do Partisan Media Polarize Viewers?”, American Journal of Political Science (2013)

=== Books ===
- The Partisan Sort: How Liberals Became Democrats and Conservatives Became Republicans
