= National Center for Health Services Research =

U.S. agency for health services research

The National Center for Health Services Research was a United States government program tasked with conducting research into health services.

It was established on July 23, 1974. It was transferred from the Health Resources Administration to the Department of Health, Education, and Welfare on December 2, 1977. It was renamed the National Center for Health Services Research and Health Care Technology Assessment on October 30, 1984. The Center was terminated on December 19, 1989.

== See also ==
- National Center for Health Statistics
- Health Resources and Services Administration
- National Resource Center for Health Information Technology
