= James Kuklinski =

James H. Kuklinski (born April 14, 1946) is an American political scientist.

Kuklinski graduated from the University of Wisconsin–Madison in 1968 and earned a doctorate at the University of Iowa in 1975. He held the Matthew T. McClure Professorship at the University of Illinois Urbana–Champaign, and was granted emeritus status upon retirement.

== Selected publications ==
- Kuklinski, James H. (2001). Citizens and Politics: Perspectives from Political Psychology. Cambridge University Press. ISBN 9780521593762.
- Kuklinski, James H. (2002). Thinking about Political Psychology. Cambridge University Press. ISBN 9780521593779.
- Druckman, James N.; Green, Donald P.; Kuklinski, James H.; Lupia, Arthur, eds. (2011). Cambridge Handbook of Experimental Political Science. Cambridge University Press. ISBN 9780521174558.
