= James Druckman =

American political scientist

James N. Druckman
- Born: 26 June 1971 (age 55)
- Education: Northwestern University (BA); University of California, San Diego (MA, PhD)
- Occupations: Political scientist, professor

James N. Druckman (born 26 June 1971) is an American political scientist and a professor at the University of Rochester. Druckman was elected to the American Academy of Arts and Sciences in 2012 and the National Academy of Sciences in 2026.

Druckman earned a bachelor's degree at Northwestern University in 1993, followed by a doctorate from the University of California, San Diego in 1999. He was an assistant professor at the University of Minnesota, and returned to Northwestern in 2005 as a faculty member, where he was appointed Payson S. Wild Professor of Political Science in 2009 and also the associate director of Northwestern’s Institute for Policy Research. In addition, he is an Honorary Professor of Political Science at Aarhus University in Denmark. Starting Spring 2024, he joined the Rochester faculty as the Martin Anderson Brewer Professor of Political Science.

With Nancy Mathiowetz, he was co-editor-in-chief of Public Opinion Quarterly for four volumes, from 2008 to 2012. and their joint tenure saw the publication of the journal's 75th anniversary edition.

== Publications ==
- Druckman has authored or coauthored more than 150 articles.
- Partisan Hostility and American Democracy (University of Chicago Press, 2024)
- Equality Unfulfilled: How Title IX’s Policy Design Undermines Change to College Sports (Cambridge University Press, 2023)
- Experimental Thinking: A Primer on Social Science Experiments (Cambridge University Press, 2022)
- Druckman, James N.; Jacobs, Lawrence R. (2015). Who Governs? Presidents, Public Opinion, and Manipulation. University of Chicago Press. ISBN 9780226234410.
- Druckman, James N.; Green, Donald P.; Kuklinski, James H.; Lupia, Arthur, eds. (2011). Cambridge Handbook of Experimental Political Science. Cambridge University Press. ISBN 9780521174558.
