= Active audience theory =

Mass media theory

Active Audience Theory argues that media audiences do not just receive information passively but are actively involved, often unconsciously, in making sense of the message within their personal and social contexts. Decoding of a media message may therefore be influenced by such things as family background, beliefs, values, culture, interests, education and experiences. Decoding of a message means how well a person is able to effectively receive and understand a message. Active Audience Theory is particularly associated with mass-media usage and is a branch of Stuart Hall's Encoding and Decoding Model.

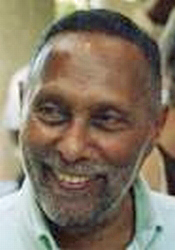
Stuart Hall

Stuart Hall said that audiences were active and not passive when looking at people who were trying to make sense of media messages. Active is when an audience is engaging, interpreting, and responding to media messages and are able to question the message. Passive is when an audience accepts a message without question and by doing so would be directly affected by it. Stuart Hall in his work, Encoding and Decoding in the Television Discourse (1973), greatly emphasized the relationship of the sender and receiver while looking at various factors of how the message is interpreted. Hall claims that the audience is what dictates whether a message is successful or not and found that an audience is able to alter the meaning of a message to support the social context they are in. As a result, Hall came up with the conclusion that the message encoded by the sender is not always going to be the message that will be decoded by the audience, see Encoding/decoding model. Encoding is what allows a person to be able to understand a given message, while decoding is how well a person is able to understand the given message when received. Hall emphasizes the fact that even though the sender of a message may feel it will be interpreted clearly, the interpreted message is dependent on how the audience understands the given message.

Active audience theory is seen as a direct contrast to the Effects traditions, however, Jenny Kitzinger, professor of Communications at Cardiff University, argues against discounting the effect or influence media can have on an audience, acknowledging that an active audience does not mean that media effect or influence is not possible. Supporting this view, other theories combine the concepts of active audience theory and the effects model, such as the two-step flow theory where Katz and Lazarsfeld argue that persuasive media texts are filtered through opinion leaders who are in a position to 'influence' the targeted audience through social networks and peer groups.

== Related Theories and Models ==
Other theories and models are compatible with active audience theory, including the Encoding/Decoding model and the Uses and gratifications theory. There has been much debate and research on how audiences interpret the Mass media and the effects mass media has on its audiences and the messages they receive. Some further key theories that influenced and developed active audience theory are: hypodermic needle model, behaviorism, uses and gratifications, manipulative model, two-step flow theory and the violence debate.

=== Encoding/Decoding Model ===
Stuart Hall came up with the Encoding/Decoding Model, which is a part of the Active Audience Theory. This theory looks at the relationships of messages/texts/media messages and the audience interpreting these messages. Encoding is the looking at the construction of a message from a sender, and decoding is looking at the receiver and how they are interpreting/understanding the given message.

=== Uses and gratifications theory ===
Uses and gratifications theory states that audiences are actively involved in determining what media they engage with and how, in order to gratify specific needs or desires.

=== Effects traditions ===
Effects tradition researches the influences mass media has on its audience. One of the major focus areas of Effects tradition was on anti-social behavior and how it came from mass media. Research then turned to looking at what mass media did to audiences and what audiences did with mass media. See also propaganda and the effects it has on audiences.

- Propaganda is a form of communication messaging containing information and ideas that has a goal of persuading or causing change in the way a group or person feels about something and can be related to effect tradition. Although propaganda typically has a negative connotation attached to it, this form of messaging information is used to influence the audience and further an agenda (agenda-setting theory) whether it is meant for causing positive or negative responses from an audience. See also scholarly work of propaganda focused on the digital age.
- Persuasion in communication is another term for influential, or influence, in communication. Persuasion is a process of communication to influence a person or audience on cognitive, affective, and behavioral information. See also Suggestion Theory and how it relates to persuasion in communication and media effects research by Patrick R. Parsons.
