= Influencer marketing =

Type of social media marketing

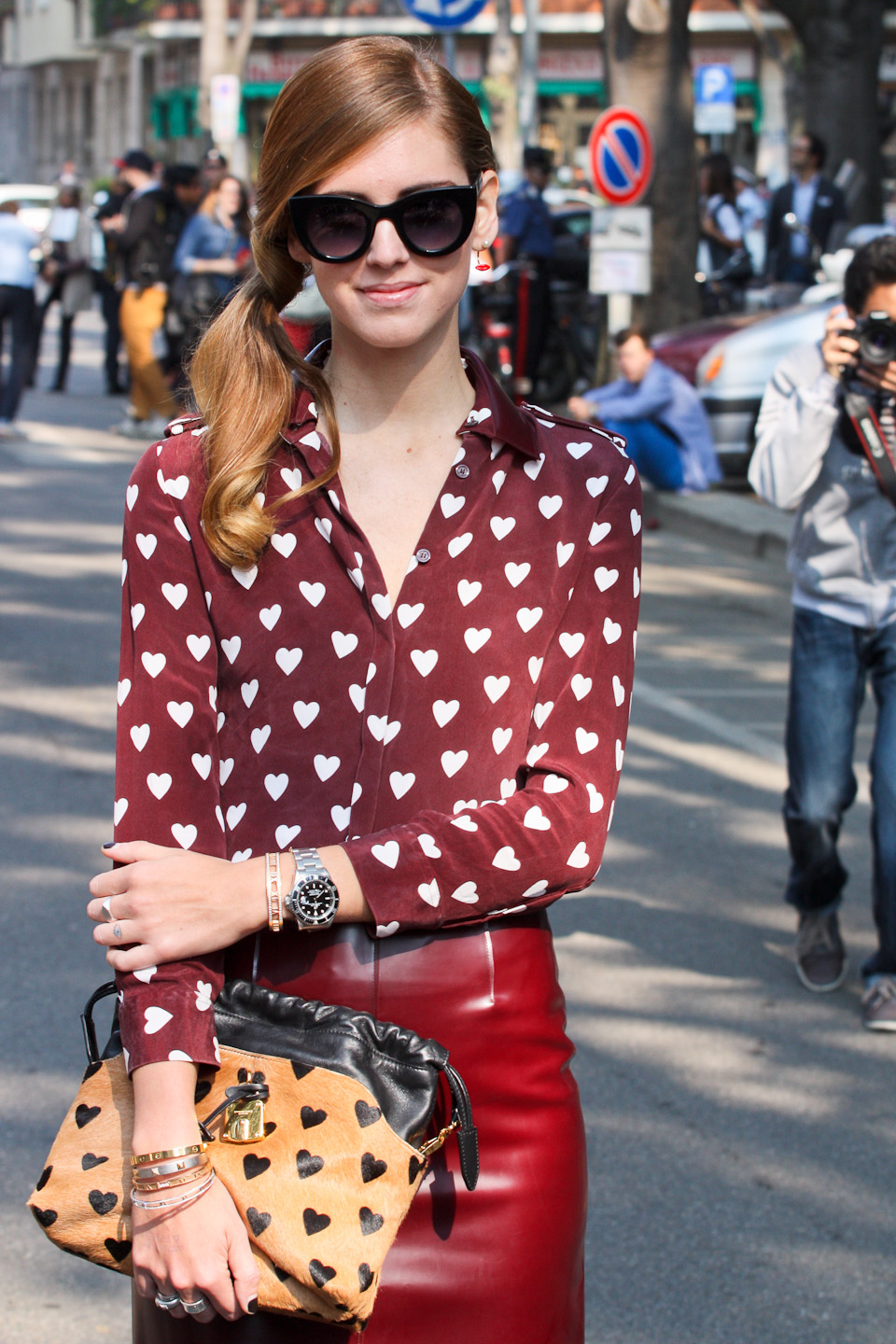
Chiara Ferragni is a fashion influencer and blogger known for her sponsored fashion posts.

Influencer marketing (also known as influence marketing) is a form of social media marketing involving endorsements and product placement from influencers, individuals and organizations who have a purported expert level of knowledge or social influence in their field. Influencers are people (or something) with the power to affect the buying habits or quantifiable actions of others by uploading some form of original—often sponsored—content to social media platforms like Instagram, YouTube, Snapchat, TikTok or other online channels. Influencer marketing occurs when a brand engages influencers who have an established credibility and audience on social media platforms to discuss or mention the brand in a social media post.

Influencer content may be framed as testimonial advertising, according to the Federal Trade Commission (FTC) in the United States. The FTC started enforcing this on a large scale in 2016, sending letters to several companies and influencers who had failed to disclose sponsored content. Many Instagram influencers started using #ad in response and feared that this would affect their income. However, fans increased their engagement after the disclosure, satisfied they were landing such deals. This success led to some creators creating their own product lines in 2017. Some influencers fake sponsored content to gain credibility and promote themselves. Backlash to sponsored content became more prominent in mid-2018, leading many influencers to focus instead on authenticity.

Influencer marketing began with early celebrity endorsements and has rapidly spread since the rise of popular social media platforms like Instagram, TikTok, and YouTube. Influencer marketing shows how influencers have become important figures in fashion and beauty with a very impactful voice and opinion among consumers. The legacy of influencer marketing highlights its power in shaping consumer behavior, with concerns about authenticity and transparency continuing to grow.

== Impact on consumers ==
=== Behavior ===
Influencer marketing has become a new strategy that shapes consumer behavior and purchasing decisions through videos and posts. This is shown particularly when looked at through social media platforms like Instagram and TikTok. Influencers have the ability to create personalized and interactive content to share directly with their audiences enhances brand engagement and overall purchasing intention. Social media influencers significantly impact consumers purchasing decisions by showing trust, authenticity, and overall credibility. This allows viewers to trust influencer opinions and ultimately follow what they say to be true. Additionally, influencers who show expertise, interact with followers, and demonstrate reliability contribute to higher consumer trust, making influencer marketing more persuasive than traditional advertising in today's digital world. As a result, more brands are leaning toward influencer marketing to showcase their products since it has been seen to bring in more revenue to their company. Recent research highlights that factors such as influencer attractiveness and quality of content play a major role in how strongly influencers shape consumer behavior.

Statistics show that such a large amount of people follow influencers that these influencers have become where people find new products. Consumers often take into consideration what influencers have to say about a product, using their recommendation instead of referencing traditional advertisements, since influencers give a sense of reliability and authenticity. Research on digital marketing content shows that influencers foster consumer engagement by being authentic. Influencers create a relationship with followers by commenting back to comments and interacting back with people so that people truly feel connected to the influencer as if there is a real friendship there making people trust their opinions on products.

This positively affects consumer behavior, which contributes to greater trust, satisfaction, and ultimately influences purchasing decisions. The impact of influencer credibility is strong when looking at impulsive buying behaviors. When consumers trust influencers, they are more likely to make impulsive purchases.

== Social influence ==
Most discussions of social influence focus on social persuasion and compliance. In the context of influencer marketing, influence is less about advocating for a point of view or product than about loose interactions between parties in a community (often with the aim of encouraging purchasing or behavior). Although influence is often equated with advocacy, it may also be negative.

By examining consumer engagement through self-determination theory, where influencers foster engagement by aligning with consumer motivations and intentions, this adds a better understanding of influencer influence since it shows how influencers cater to what their consumers want to see. Although influence is often associated with advocacy, it may also be negative. Some research highlights that negative influence may grow when viewers see influencer marketing as inauthentic, especially when looking at influencer directed campaigns that can lack the trust built by brand loyalty. This highlights the importance of authenticity in influencer marketing and overall consumer trust in brands and influencers. A review further dives into that authenticity, credibility, and trust are central to effective influencer marketing. This highlighting that influencers who appear fake risk damaging both brand reputation and consumer relationships.

Corona was one of the beer brands whose sales rose as Bud Light's fell.

For a partnership with an influencer to not look fake or forced a brand must do a lot of research on influencers to see who can authentically benefit from their product or even find influencers who are already using their products. That way it feels reasonable and natural and not out of character for the influencer to be partnering with said brand. Not only do you want the influencers content to match what your product stands for but the brand must research its own ethics and audience. A brand can find a creator who would benefit from their product or be an active user of the product already, but the creator’s ethics and audience may not align with the brand’s ethics and audience. An example of this is Bud Light using transgender influencer, Dylan Mulvaney as the face of a March Madness campaign back in April 2023. Dylan Mulvaneys audience and Bud Lights audience are different, so when Dylan posted the video a lot of Bud Light drinkers were upset and Bud Lights sales dropped as people began to boycott the drink and started buying other beer brands. In 2025, it was reported Bud Light was still down 30% in sales after the crisis and other beers were now beating them in revenue taking advantage of the fall of Bud Light. Bud Light issued statements to rebuild their image after the crisis. All of that came from not paying attention to a current audience base. This highlights the importance of researching influencers and the brand to make sure everything lines up so there are no crisis’s later on. You don’t want someone else to hurt your brand image.

The two-step flow of communication model was introduced in The People's Choice (Paul Lazarsfeld, Bernard Berelson, and Hazel Gaudet's 1940 study of voters' decision-making processes), and developed in Personal Influence (Lazarsfeld, Elihu Katz 1955) and The Effects of Mass Communication (Joseph Klapper, 1960).

Influencer marketing is also important through social comparison theory. As psychologist Chae reports, influencers serve as a comparison tool. Consumers may compare influencer lifestyles with their imperfections. Meanwhile, followers may view influencers as people with perfect lifestyles, interests, and dressing style. As such, the promoted products may serve as a shortcut towards a complete lifestyle. Chae's study finds women with low self-esteem compare their own to the influencers. As such, they elevate the status of influencers above themselves. When using an influencer, a brand may use consumer insecurities to its benefits. For this reason, influencer marketing may lead to misleading advertising.

A significant portion of Gen Z Americans consider being an influencer as a "reputable career choice".

== Influencer entrepreneurship ==
Social media influencers can act as independent entrepreneurs whose businesses are built around personal brands. This led to younger people viewing social media as a potential source of financial independence. A 2023 survey conducted by Junior Achievement found that 76% of US teens had an interest in becoming entrepreneurs, while the majority of those teens cited social media influencers as their inspiration.

The growth of content houses in 2019 played an influence into younger audiences to want to pursue influencing as a career. These houses would hold handfuls of content creators within the same type of content, for example like prank channels, would live in houses together. A major one being the Hype Houses that blew up during Covid times. Perceiving this image that you can live with your best friends and have fun all day and make money off of it.

Cheng, Guo, and Zhao (2024) describe mastery of algorithms and digital reputation as a new form of social capital, which has encouraged youth to see posting simple videos on social media platforms as a possible path to becoming a profession. Per Abidin (2018), Internet celebrities often become entrepreneurs by turning the window of fame that they built through being influencers into income streams, selling branded products, or sponsoring with companies. Research from Okereke and Eze (2025) shows that influencer marketing has allowed youth in Nigeria to use social media and different digital marketing tools for business creation.

Studies in Thailand by Cantawee et al. (2012) shows a connection between an influencers' perceived authenticity and creativity and their effectiveness at marketing. Hund (2023) says that the influencer marketing industry's Focus on authenticity can create negative pressures for young entrepreneurs trying to maintain idealized online personas by neglecting their own personal identity for commercial intent.

== Social media ==
Online activity plays a central role in offline decision-making, allowing consumers to research products. Social media has created new opportunities for marketers to expand their strategies beyond traditional mass-media channels. Many use influencers to increase the reach of their marketing messages. Online influencers who curate personal brands have become marketing assets because of their relationship with their followers. Social media influencers establish themselves as opinion leaders with their followers and may have persuasive strengths such as attractiveness, likeability, niche expertise, and perceived good taste. The interactive and personal nature of social media allows parasocial relationships to form between influencers and their followers, which impacts purchase behavior. Additionally, influencer marketing on social media reaches consumers who use ad-blockers.

There is a diversity of influencers creating content. Every influencer has their own way of advertising and making content allowing businesses to fit into new spaces and gain new audiences because it is not your typical advertising like ads and commercials instead they are getting new fun ways to show off products with individuals that have a following.

Critics of an online-intensive approach say that by researching exclusively online, consumers can overlook input from other influential individuals. Early-2000s research suggested that 80 to 92 percent of influential consumer exchanges occurred face-to-face through word-of-mouth (WOM), compared to seven to 10 percent in an online environment. Scholars and marketers distinguish WOM from electronic word-of-mouth (eWOM).

=== Use by governments ===
Given their impact, especially among younger people, influencers have also been enlisted by governments. Countries like Egypt and the United Arab Emirates have been using these influencers to spread a positive image of them and distract from human rights criticisms. In Dubai, many such influencers have been working to promote the city's tourism by acquiring an expensive license or through agencies. Emirati authorities tightly manage influencers to ensure that the country is depicted in a positive light. Dubai authorities also restrict these influencers from speaking about religion, politics or against the regime. A report in October 2022 revealed that some influencers promoting Dubai engaged in prostitution, using their high-profile to find clients and charge higher rates. Although prostitution is illegal in Dubai, increasing numbers engage in the practice due to the rise in the number of ultra-rich expatriates in Dubai, including Russian oligarchs moving to the emirate to escape the US sanctions.

== Applications ==
Marketers use influencer marketing to establish credibility in a market, to generate social conversations about brands, and to focus on driving online or in-store sales. They leverage credibility gained over time to promote a variety of products or services. Success in influencer marketing is measured through earned media value, impressions, and cost per action. Globally, 86% of brands planned to use influencer marketing in 2024.

A social media influencer's personal brand and product relation with marketers are important concepts. As social learning theory suggests, influencers serve as informed consumers and authenticity matters. When credible influencers align with the product, consumers will consider the promoted recommendations. A study found that respondents see influencers as a neutral authority pitch for a product. Compared to CEO spokespeople, influencers are seen as approachable and trustworthy. Consumers are more likely to respond to influencers if both parties share certain characteristics and beliefs.

A 2015 article depicts that attributions drive endorsers and that globally 77% of shoppers would or may take action following what family, friends, and online reviews endorse. It shows that word of mouth marketing and digital media have changed the impact and reach of endorsements.

== Regulation ==
In the United States, the Federal Trade Commission (FTC) treats influencer marketing as a form of paid endorsement. It is governed by the rules for native advertising, which include compliance with established truth-in-advertising standards and disclosure by endorsers (influencers) and is known as the Endorsement Guides. The FTC compiled an easy-to-read guide on disclosure for influencers, specifying rules and tips on how to make good disclosures on social media. The guidelines include reminders of disclosing sponsored products in easily visible places so it is hard to miss, using easy-to-understand language, and giving honest reviews about sponsored products.

In 2017, the FTC sent more than 90 educational letters to celebrity and athlete influencers with the reminder of the obligation to clearly disclose business relationships while sponsoring and promoting products. The same year, in response to YouTubers Trevor Martin and Thomas Cassell deceptively endorsing an online gambling site they owned, the FTC took three separate actions to catch the attention of influencers. By using law enforcement, warning letters, and updating the Endorsement Guidelines, the FTC provided influencers with endorsement questions or involved in misleading endorsements and disclosures with clear procedures of how to follow the laws.

Media-regulating bodies in other countries – such as Australia – followed the FTC in creating influencer-marketing guidelines.

The United Kingdom's Competition and Markets Authority and Advertising Standards Authority adopted similar laws and tips for influencers to follow. The UK's Financial Conduct Authority have also warned "finfluencers" (influencers in the financial realm) of legal consequences for failing to include the kind of risk warnings required for financial and investment products.

== Abuse ==
All criteria used to determine the veracity of an influencer account can be fabricated. Third-party sites and apps sell services to individual accounts which falsely boost follower counts, likes, and comments.

An analysis of over 7,000 influencers in the UK indicated that about half of their followers have up to 20,000 "low-quality" followers themselves, consisting of internet bots and other suspicious accounts. Over four in 10 engagements with this group of influencers are considered "non-authentic". A study of UK influencers which looked at almost 700,000 posts from the first half of 2018 found that 12 percent of UK influencers had bought fake followers. Twenty-four percent of influencers were found to have abnormal growth patterns in another study, indicating that they had manipulated their likes or followers.

Influencer fraud (including fake followers) was estimated to cost businesses up to $1.3 billion, about 15 percent of global influencer–marketing spending. Research in 2019 accounted only for the calculable cost of fake followers.

== Virtual influencers ==
Virtual influencers are virtual characters, originally intentionally designed by 3D artists and later by Artificial intelligence (A.I.) to look like real people in real situations. Although most of the characters were at first easily identified as computer graphics, the technology improved and newer versions are very realistic and can fool users. The characters are usually identified as models, singers, or other celebrities. Their creators write their biographies, conduct interviews on their behalf, and act like the characters themselves. With the A.I. improving fast, by 2026 a large number of A.I. influencers existed and even A.I. versions of real world celebrities were created by advertisers, in order to take a cut from the income generated by having them do advertisements.

Lil Miquela was an early realistic virtual influencer from 2016 which prompted curiosity and speculation until it was learned that she was created by advertisers.

== See also ==
- Affiliate marketing
- Alpha user
- Business marketing
- Celebrity branding
- Conspicuous consumption
- Consumerism
- Customer engagement
- Influence-for-hire
- Internet celebrity
- Mass communication
- Opinion leadership
- Relationship marketing
- Reputation management
- Shill
- Social media in the fashion industry
- Testimonial
- Word-of-mouth marketing
