= Western media =

Mass media of the Western world

Western media is the mass media of the Western world (i.e. the United States, Canada, Western Europe, Australia, and New Zealand). In recent years, Western media has gradually expanded into the non-Western world (i.e. Africa, Asia, Eastern Europe, Latin America, and the Pacific Islands).

== History ==
The roots of the Western media can be traced back to the late 15th century, when printing presses began to operate throughout Western Europe. The emergence of news media in the 17th century has to be seen in close connection with the spread of the printing press, from which the publishing press derives its name.

In Britain, newspapers developed during a period of political upheaval that challenged the absolute rule of the British monarchy. In 1641, newspapers were allowed to publish domestic news for the first time. Despite strict controls placed by the political elite on the print media to restrict the expansion of the press, the print industry continued to grow. By the late 18th century, over 10 million newspapers were distributed annually in Britain alone.

Bosah Ebo writes that "during the Cold War, the United States and Soviet Union engaged in an intense media diplomacy aimed to create international image of each other." Voice of America and Radio Free Europe were established by the U.S. as counterpoints to the Communist-dominated news media in the Eastern Bloc. Scholar James Schwoch writes, "Western-inspired television programming and development in Cold War Germany and Europe began as not so much a case of the unfettered free flow of information from West to East, but rather as a strong counterbalance preventing, or discouraging, the Soviet-sourced first flow of the European television landscape."

During the Cold War, Western media outlets were gradually accepted as a trustworthy and reliable source of news. In former East Germany, surveys showed that over 91% of migrants from East Germany perceived Western media outlets to be more reliable than East German media outlets.

== Characteristics ==
New Left Review editor Tariq Ali asserts that "the notion of a free press in the Western media in the 20 century evolved as a counterpoint to the monopolistic State-owned model of erstwhile Soviet Union with the aim of showing its superiority by accommodating diversity of voices. In terms of what it published and what it showed, the Western media gained its peak during the Cold War era."

=== Global coverage ===
In 2011, "The Protester" was named "Person of the Year" by Time magazine

- Africa – A 1997 study found that the American newsmagazine Newsweek and the German newsmagazine Der Spiegel regularly reported on Africa issues, but that "most of the news comes from regions of conflict and can be regarded as crisis news." The study found that "the ratio of crisis to non-crisis news" was more balanced in Newsweek than in Der Spiegel.
- Middle East – It has been claimed that past representations of Arabs in Western media have relied heavily on racial myths and stereotypes and that coverage of the Israeli–Palestinian conflict is perceived to be sympathetic towards Israel and Israeli Jews.

=== Coverage of military conflicts ===
Criticism of the media coverage leading up to the 2003 invasion of Iraq has been acute. One study examined every evening television news story related to Iraq on ABC, CBS, and NBC. The study found that "that news coverage conformed in some ways to the conventional wisdom: Bush administration officials were the most frequently quoted sources, the voices of anti-war groups and opposition Democrats were barely audible, and the overall thrust of coverage favored a pro-war perspective." However, the study also found that "it is too facile to conclude that anti-war positions were completely marginalized. In contrast to the common critiques of media coverage, even as elites in the United States were not publicly sparring, journalists turned to foreign officials for the anti-war perspective." The network media did commonly report "opposition from abroad—in particular, from Iraq and officials from countries such as France, who argued for a diplomatic solution to the standoff."

Max Abrahms, writing in Foreign Affairs, has criticized Western media's coverage of the Syrian Civil War, arguing that it is overly favorable to the Syrian opposition and fails to take into account extremist elements within the opposition.

=== Coverage of human rights ===
Coverage of global human rights increased in the media of the Global North between 1985 and 2000. A regression analysis of human rights reporting by the newsmagazines The Economist and Newsweek found that "these two media sources cover abuses in human rights terms more frequently when they occur in countries with higher levels of state repression, economic development, population, and Amnesty International attention. There is also some evidence that political openness, number of battle-deaths, and civil societies affect coverage, although these effects were not robust."

In 2008, an empirical analysis of the effects of "naming and shaming" of governments that are said to perpetrate human rights abuses (by media outlets as well as by governments and nongovernmental organizations) found that "governments put in the global spotlight for violations often adopt better protections for political rights afterward, but they rarely stop or appear to lessen acts of terror." The study also found that "In a few places, global publicity is followed by more repression in the short term, exacerbating leaders' insecurity and prompting them to use terror, especially when armed opposition groups or elections threaten their monopoly on power."

=== Ownership patterns ===
The media in the United States is largely privately owned. In other democratic nations of the Western world, particularly in Western Europe, print media outlets such as newspapers are usually privately owned, but public broadcasting is dominant in the broadcast media (radio and television). Historically, the United States was the only developed nation that "created a broadcasting system that was advertiser-supported virtually from the start." The contrasting Western European model sees public media as "a representation of the national culture."

=== Press freedom ===
Reporters Without Borders's Press Freedom Index scored the following countries the highest in 2018: Norway, Sweden, the Netherlands, Finland, Switzerland, Jamaica, Belgium, New Zealand, Denmark, and Costa Rica. UNESCO reported in 2014 that "the freedom to publish in the 27 countries of the Western Europe and North America region has remained strong and widely upheld."

== Criticism ==
In the 1970s, some scholars in communications studies, such as Oliver Boyd-Barrett, Jeremy Tunstall and Elihu Katz, advanced a "media imperialism" perspective. This theory posits that there is an "iniquitous flow of cultural production from the First to the Third World, whereby the media of advanced capitalist economies were able to substantially influence, if not actually determine, the nature of cultural production and consumption within Third World countries," leading to cultural hegemonization in favor of individualism and consumerism. Lee Kuan Yew of Singapore, Hindu nationalists in India, and the Chinese authorities have all pressed for restrictions on Western media in their respective nations, viewing it as a possible threat to Asian values. Other scholars, such as Fred Fejes, Daniël Biltereyst and Hamid Naficy, have criticized the "media imperialism" theory, arguing that it unjustifiably relies on a "hypodermic needle model" of media effects, overstates the influences of media on the audience's behavior and views, and romanticizes "national culture" unduly.

=== From India ===
In 2015, Arnab Goswami, the former editor-in-chief of India's most popular English news channel Times Now, criticised the hegemony of Western media has ruined the balance of power that is required. He also supported his argument by citing that US and UK together contribute 74% of the source of global news, whereas all of Asia contributes only 3%. He said. "If I had to summarise that in one line, it basically says that Indians are the 'least insular people, most open-minded', 'Americans are the most insular people', but they have complete dominance over the global narrative in terms of news."

=== From China ===
Following the Chinese 2014 Kunming attack, Chinese state media and Chinese social media users criticized major Western media outlets that placed quotation marks around the word "terrorism" in news articles about the event. While some Chinese Internet users interpreted the quotation marks as attribution to the statements of the Chinese government, others accused the Western media of sympathizing with the separatists. China accused "Western commentators, with their focus on Uighur rights, of hypocrisy and double standards on terrorism."

=== From Russia ===
Russian media and government often claims that Western media is biased against Russia. Human Rights Watch wrote in 2018 that the Russian Foreign Ministry has promoted conspiracy theories about "the Western media" and denounced critical news coverage. In 2005, Russia established Russia Today (later RT); Julia Ioffe, writing in the Columbia Journalism Review, writes that RT was established as a soft power and propaganda instrument, aimed at countering Western media outlets and promoting Russian foreign policy. In the second half of 2012, between 2.25 and 2.5 million Britons watched RT broadcasting (making it the third-most watched rolling news channel in Britain, behind BBC News and Sky News).

An article by Andrei P. Tsygankov on editorials in The New York Times, The Washington Post, and The Wall Street Journal related to Russian domestic politics from 2008 to 2014 found that the editorials took an overwhelmingly negative view of the Russian government, based on such issues as "elections, opposition and minority rights, the justice system, protection of property rights, freedom of media, development of NGOs and civil society, protection of citizens against crime and terrorism, mechanisms for the transfer of power, attitudes of Putin and Medvedev, and relations with Western nations." Tsygankov said that the editorials failed to adequately reflect "neutral and positive frames and such as those stressing the country's relative progress or objective difficulties faced in its development." By contrast, James Nixey of the Russia and Eurasia Programme at Chatham House argued that fair reporting does not require false equivalence between Russian and Western actions, and that negative coverage of Russia was understandable given its conduct in Crimea, Georgia, and Syria, and its poor human rights record.

== See also ==
- Agenda-setting theory
- Alternative media
- Big Three television networks
- Eurocentrism
- Freedom of the press
- Mainstream media
- Media bias
- Media conglomerate
- Media cross-ownership in the United States
- Media democracy
- Media manipulation
- Media proprietor
- Media transparency
- Old media
- Propaganda model
- State controlled media
