= Two-step flow of communication =

Model of communication

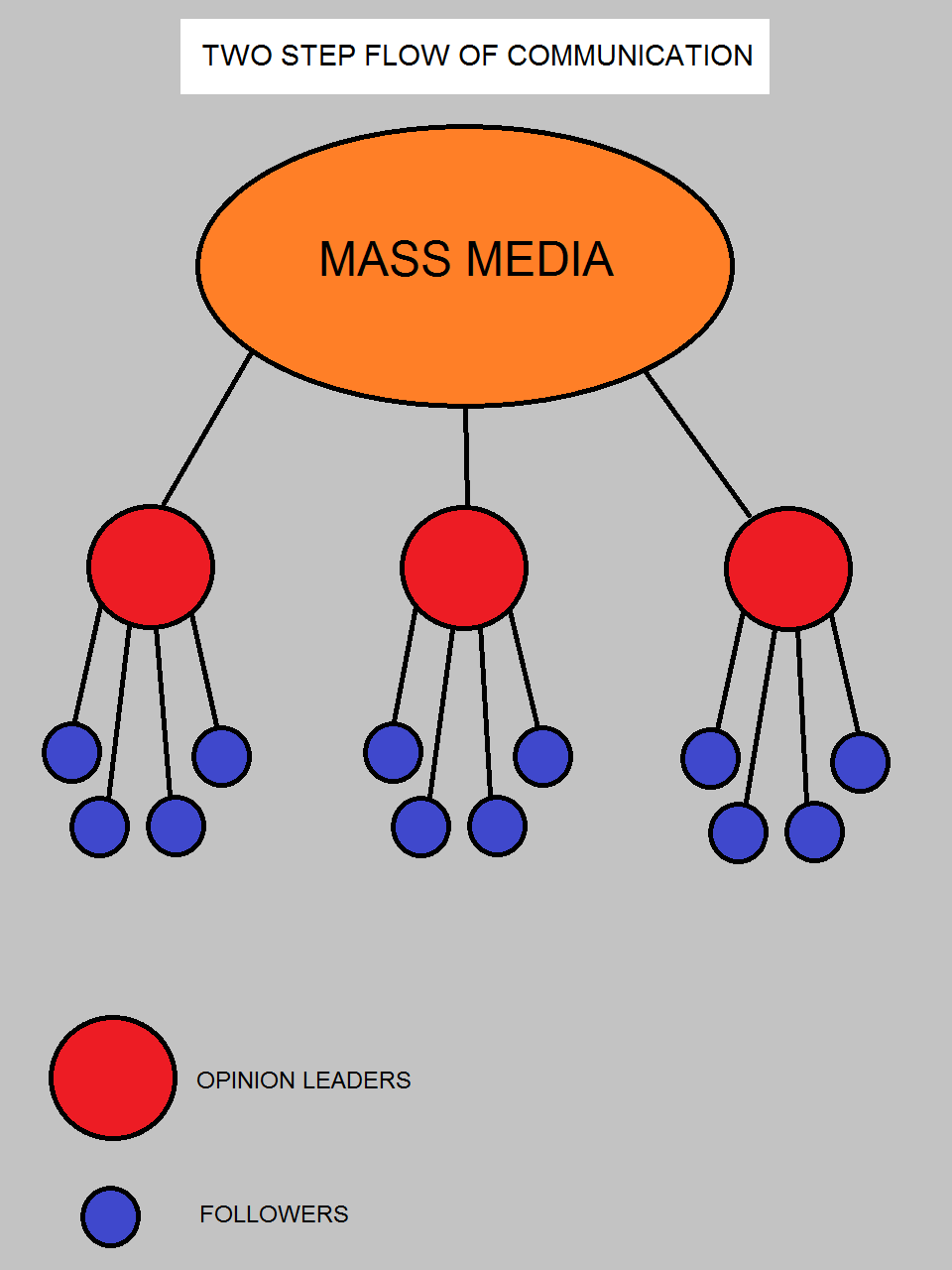
Two-step Flow of Communication Model, by Lazarsfeld and Katz (1955)

The two-step flow of communication model says that most people form their opinions under the influence of opinion leaders, who in turn are influenced by the mass media. In contrast to the one-step flow of the hypodermic needle model or magic bullet theory, which holds that people are directly influenced by mass media, according to the two-step flow model, ideas flow from mass media to opinion leaders, and from them to a wider population. Opinion leaders pass on their own interpretation of information in addition to the actual media content.

== Basic overview ==
The theory is based on a 1940s study on social influence that states that media effects are indirectly established through the personal influence of opinion leaders. The majority of people receive much of their information and are influenced by the media secondhand, through the personal influence of opinion leaders.

== Concept ==
The two-step model says that most people are not directly influenced by mass media, and instead form their opinions based on opinion leaders who interpret media messages and put them into context. Opinion leaders are those initially exposed to a specific media content, and who interpret it based on their own opinion. They then begin to infiltrate these opinions through the general public who become "opinion followers". These "opinion leaders" gain their influence through more elite media as opposed to mainstream mass media. In this process, social influence is created and adjusted by the ideals and opinions of each specific "elite media" group, and by these media group's opposing ideals and opinions and in combination with popular mass media sources. Therefore, the leading influence in these opinions is primarily a social persuasion.

== About ==
The two-step flow of communication model hypothesizes that ideas flow from mass media to opinion leaders, and from them to a wider population. It was first introduced by sociologist Paul Lazarsfeld et al. in 1944 and elaborated by Elihu Katz and Lazarsfeld in 1955 and subsequent publications. Melvin DeFleur and Sheoron Lowery argue the book was much more than a simple research report: it was an effort to interpret the authors' research within a framework of conceptual schemes, theoretical issues, and research findings drawn broadly from the scientific study of small groups. Unlike the hypodermic needle model, which considers mass media effects to be direct, the two-step flow model stresses human agency.

For example, in the field of science communication, Matthew Nisbet describes the use of opinion leaders as intermediaries between scientists and the public as a way to reach the public via trained individuals who are more closely engaged with their communities, such as "teachers, business leaders, attorneys, policymakers, neighborhood leaders, students, and media professionals." Examples of initiatives that take this approach include Science & Engineering Ambassadors, sponsored by the National Academy of Sciences, and Science Booster Clubs, coordinated by the National Center for Science Education.

According to Lazarsfeld and Katz, mass media information is channeled to the "masses" through opinion leadership. The people with most access to media, and having a more literate understanding of media content, explain and diffuse the content to others.

Based on the two-step flow hypothesis, the term "personal influence" came to illustrate the process intervening between the media's direct message and the audience's reaction to that message. Opinion leaders tend to be similar to those they influence—based on personality, interests, demographics, or socio-economic factors. These leaders tend to influence others to change their attitudes and behaviors. The two-step theory refined the ability to predict how media messages influence audience behavior and explains why certain media campaigns do not alter audiences' attitudes. This hypothesis provided a basis for the two-step flow theory of mass communication.

=== Contemporary debate ===
In the times of digital social media, the more than six decade old theory sparks much new interest. The fact that massive databases are being used to send tailor-made messages to individuals leads back to the idea of a "one-step flow of communication". The idea is a kind of Hypodermic needle / magic bullet model, with the capacity of big data analytics informed mass customization. Empirical studies by other scholars, in contrast, have found that modern social media platforms, like Twitter, exhibit clear evidence of a two-step flow of communication. Many social media users obtain their news from celebrities or other amplifying opinion leaders, who again get informed by mass media or by individuals with specific insights. The fine-grained digital footprint of social media also suggests that there are more than simply the one-step and two-step modes of communication flow, leading the search for more complex Multistep Flow Models based on distinct network structures.

A study done on the Annang people of Akwa Ibom State, Nigeria defined how mass media has changed the role of traditional leaders regarding the two-step flow theory. The study showed that mass media creates awareness, but does not cause people to change their thoughts or actions. The study displayed that people hear information from the media, but rely on their opinion leaders to verify and provide context. The emergence of mass media has not made opinion leaders obsolete. Instead, it has changed the role that opinion leaders play. Opinion leaders and mass media work together to inform people.

==== Influencers ====
Although Paul Lazarsfeld introduced this theory more than seventy years ago, two-step flow is still relevant today. The surge of social media has made influencers into today's opinion leaders. These individuals absorb information and then share it on various social media platforms. This has slightly altered the original two-step flow theory. The modern take is not just a linear two-step process but a more complex network that exchanges information across social media. This is more accurately described as a multi-step flow theory.

In The Two-Step Flow Theory in the Digital Age, Safran Almakaty states, "The linearity of the original TSF model has given way to complex, multi-step, and networked flows, with information traveling through diverse pathways shaped by network structures, platform affordances, and algorithmic logics." One Step, Two Step, Network Step? Complementary Perspectives on Communication Flows in Twittered Citizen Protests states that "a core group of primary influencers who act as conduits within the network are more influential in developing shared attitudes and cognitions among members of active publics online than traditional mass media sources are".

Opinion leaders today are not just stand-alone sources of information; they actively engage with their core audiences and interact with other leaders. "These relationships involve audience interactions with mass opinion leaders, who respond to followers' requests, comments, and feedback, forging the group context in which opinion leadership can best be exercised." Before social media, opinion leaders had a straight line to the masses. But now communication has changed into a dynamic, back-and-forth exchange among opinion leaders, influencers, and individuals. Almakaty asserts that "the contemporary digital media environment is characterized by ubiquitous connectivity, interactivity, user-generated content, networked publics, algorithmic curation, and the blurring of content creators and consumers." End users have become active participants in the flow of information, which is a shift from the original theory in the 1950s. In Who Sets the Agenda, Brosius et al. explain that "the public is not a monolithic and passive recipient of the media agenda. Within the public, there are certain individuals who are more active in identifying emerging issues and in diffusing them to the public or media agenda." They share ideas, reactions, and opinions, all of which help others form their own views about the information. As these original opinion leaders share information, they are also influenced by others in the network. The result is a dynamic and complex flow of information.

Although the two-step flow theory has evolved over time, its core premise remains unchanged: interpersonal communication is central to the effective spread of information.

== Lazarsfeld and Katz ==
Paul Lazarsfeld and Elihu Katz are considered to be the founders of functional theory and their book Personal Influence (1955) is considered to be the handbook to the theory.

=== Paul Felix Lazarsfeld ===
One of the first to embark on Communications research was the first to introduce the difference between 'administrative research' and 'critical research' in regards to the media. Critical research he believed, criticizes the media institutions themselves for the perspective ways they serve dominant social groups. Critical research favors interperspective and inductive methods of inquiry. Lazarsfeld's study of the 1940 presidential election was published as The People's Choice (1944). During the research revealed information about the psychological and social processes that influence voting decisions. The study also uncovered an influence process that Lazarsfeld called "opinion leadership." He concluded that there is a multistep flow of information from the mass media to persons who serve as opinion leaders which then is passed on to the general public. He called this communication process the "two-step flow of communication".

=== Elihu Katz ===
Elihu Katz was a psychologist in the School for Communication at the University of Pennsylvania when he collaborated with Lazarsfeld in 1955. Their research aimed to observe the flow of influence at the intersections of mass and interpersonal communication which resulted in the book Personal Influence. Katz pursued Lazarfeld's research in a study of the flow of information, which is the basis of Personal Influence. Katz and Lazarsfeld concluded that: "... the traditional image of the mass persuasion process must make room for 'people' as intervening factors between the stimuli of the media and resultant opinions, decisions, and actions."

== Published works on the theory ==
=== The People's Choice ===
The presidential election of 1940 saw President Franklin Roosevelt seek an unprecedented third term in office. Funded by grants from the Rockefeller Foundation, Life magazine, and the pollster Elmo Roper, Columbia's Office of Radio Research conducted a study of voting. It was based on a panel study of 2,400 voters in Erie County, Ohio. Paul Lazarsfeld, Bernard Berelson, and Hazel Gaudet supervised 15 interviewers, who from May–October interviewed the strategically selected 2,400 members of the community several different times in order to document their decision making process during the campaign.

Lazarsfeld, Berelson, and Gaudet broke the respondents into groups of 600. Lazarsfeld and his team interviewed three groups once more following the initial interview. They interviewed the other group each month, May–November. The team used the monthly interview to monitor what media the people were consuming and if their voting decision changed. The study found that people were more likely to have conversations about politics with those around them than to consume political media. These conversations were more likely to sway voters than the political press was. Communication with community members seems reliable since the people are trusted. This observation led to the idea of the two-step flow theory.

They focused on what factors would influence their decisions as the campaign progressed. The People's Choice, a book based on this study presented the theory of "the two-step flow of communications", which later came to be associated with the so-called "limited effects model" of mass media: the idea that ideas often flow from radio and print to local "opinion leaders" who in turn pass them on to those with more limited political knowledge, or "opinion followers." The results of the research led to the conclusion that sometimes person to person communication can be more effective than traditional media outlets such as newspapers, TV, radio etc. This idea developed further in the book Personal Influence.

=== Personal Influence ===
In 1944, Paul Lazarsfeld contacted McFadden Publications in regards to his first book, The People's Choice. The two collaborated forming a mutually beneficial partnership in which Macfadden saw a way to financially profit from advertising to the female population and Lazarsfeld saw a way to gain more information on social influence. Out of this came the study conducted by the Bureau of Applied Social Research in which 800 female residents of Decatur, Illinois, where interviewed through panel interviews to discover what and who primarily influenced their decision making. Lazarsfeld worked with Robert Merton and thus hired C. Wright Mills to head the study. Another part of the research team, Thelma Ehrlich Anderson, trained local Decatur women to administer surveys to targeted women in town. By 1955. the Decatur study was published as part of Elihu Katz and Lazarsfeld's book Personal Influence. The book concluded that ultimately, face to face interaction is more influential than traditional media influence and thus confirmed the two-step flow model of communication.

== Criticisms ==
The original two-step flow hypothesis—that ideas flow from the media to opinion leaders and then to less active sections of the population—has been criticised. In 1960, conclusions from Deutschmann and Danielson assert, "we would urge that the Katz-Lazarsfeld two-stage flow hypothesis, as a description of the initial information process, be applied to mass communication with caution".

Everett Rogers' "Diffusion of Innovations" cites one study in which two-thirds of respondents accredited their awareness to the mass media rather than face-to-face communication. Similarly, critics argue that most of Lazarsfeld's findings pertain to learning factors involved with general media habits rather than the learning of particular information.

However, Lazarsfeld's two-step hypothesis is an adequate description to understand the media's influence on belief and behavior. Troldahl finds that media exposure is a first step to introduce discussion, at which point opinion leaders initiate the second-step flow.

According to Hilbert today's digital media landscape simultaneously facilitate one-step, two-step and more complex multi-step flow models of communication. For example, in Twitter networks it is no contradiction that average Twitter users mainly mention intermediating opinion leaders in their tweets (two-step flow), while at the same time traditional mass media outlets receive 80-90 % of their mentions directly through a direct one-step flow from the same users.

Another criticism is that people have raised concerns about credit not being entirely given where it is due. According to Esperanza Herrero, women played a significant role in developing the Two-Step Flow theory. A woman named Joan Doris Goldhamer testified that she vividly remembers how she and several other women were calculating percentages, collecting data, and handling technical work. They also conducted many detailed and well-structured interviews and assisted in interpreting the information they helped gather for the theory.

== Related theories ==
Prior to the Two-Step Flow Theory, there was the Magic Bullet or Hypodermic Needle Theory. It emerged in the mid-1930s and played a significant role in the world wars. This theory suggests that audiences passively absorb the information fed to them by the media. The "bullet" or what is being "injected" represents the message. Paul Lazarsfeld and Herta Herzog debunked this theory in an episode of The War of the Worlds radio broadcast.

On the contrary, in recent years, a new theory based on the Two-Step Flow Theory has emerged—the Multi-Step Flow Theory. It is said to have been developed by the same scholars behind the Two-Step Flow Theory, sociologists Elihu Katz and Paul Lazarsfeld. Like the Two-Step Flow Theory, the Multi-Step Flow Theory describes how media messages are disseminated through intermediaries. However, some key differences exist while the Two-Step Flow Theory is linear, the Multi-Step Flow Theory is more complex. Additionally, the Multi-Step Flow Theory is part of a larger network of information and acknowledges audience participation. However, it has a much weaker direct influence compared to the Two-Step Flow Theory.

The multi-step flow theory is seen heavily on platforms such as TikTok. Social media platforms allow people to gain a following and become opinion leaders of small groups of people. The fact that so many small opinion leaders can exist has shifted how the two-step flow theory works into a multi-step flow theory. The existence of algorithms has created echo chambers, which allow misinformation to spread quickly through demographics that are only seeing the content that they want to see.

Horizontal Flow and Vertical Flow

Horizontal flow of communication and vertical flow of communication are two other theories that were developed from the two-step flow theory.

Horizontal flow, also known as lateral communication, refers to when information spreads between people who are on the same level, like friends or coworkers sharing and discussing ideas with each other. In communication research, this concept is often discussed as a complement to the two-step flow of communication model. The two-step flow model proposes that information first moves from mass media to opinion leaders and then from those opinion leaders to a broader audience. However, researcher, Henri Fayol argues that communication does not stop after this second step and instead, information frequently continues to circulate among individuals within the same social groups, creating patterns of peer-to-peer influence. This is known as horizontal flow or lateral communication. Horizontal flow frequently emerges in routine social interactions, such as conversations among friends, colleagues, classmates, and participants in online communities. Once opinion leaders disseminate new information, individuals frequently discuss it among peers with comparable social status and similar social positions. These discussions may reinforce or shape the original message, depending on how it is understood.

Vertical Flow is a concept, originated by Richard Simpson, in communication theory commonly discussed alongside two-step flow and horizontal flow. Unlike horizontal flow and two-step flow, vertical communication refers to the transfer of information between individuals at different levels of authority. Vertical communication typically occurs when information moves from leaders to subordinates or from employees to supervisors. In contrast, horizontal flow occurs between individuals who occupy similar positions within a network or organization. Vertical flow can be further divided into two different forms of communication, downward and upward. Downward communication can be described as where instructions, expectations, and feedback are delivered from higher levels to lower levels. Upward communication can be described as where feedback, concerns, and ideas are shared from lower levels to those in positions of authority. This process is essential for maintaining organizational structure, ensuring that information is clearly communicated across levels, and allowing leaders to make informed decisions based on input from others within the hierarchy. However, vertical communication can sometimes be limited by power differences, which may make individuals at lower levels less likely to speak openly or share honest feedback.

Horizontal flow is prevalent in digital communication environments, including digital communication in group chats, comment sections, and social media interactions, where information circulates through networks of peers rather than strictly through hierarchical channels. Because horizontal communication occurs among peers, it is generally more informal and facilitates the direct sharing of ideas and information. Vertical flow communication is most prevalent in environments with clearly defined hierarchies, such as corporate workplaces, healthcare systems, educational institutions, and government organizations.

== See also ==
- Word-of-mouth
- Word-of-mouth marketing
