= Media controversy =

Media controversy may refer to:

- Censorship
- Controversy
- Hypodermic needle model
- Media influence
- Media transparency
- Media violence research
- Public outcry
- Wowserism

== Media content ratings systems involved in controversies ==
- Computer Entertainment Rating Organization
- Entertainment Software Rating Board
- MPAA film rating system
- Office of Film and Literature Classification (Australia)
- Office of Film and Literature Classification (New Zealand)
- Pan European Game Information
