= Opinion leadership =

Leadership by an active media user for lower-end media users

Opinion leadership is leadership by an active media user who interprets the meaning of media messages or content for lower-end media users. Typically opinion leaders are held in high esteem by those who accept their opinions. Opinion leadership comes from the theory of two-step flow of communication propounded by Paul Lazarsfeld and Elihu Katz. Significant developers of the opinion leader concept have been Robert K. Merton, C. Wright Mills and Bernard Berelson. This theory is one of several models that try to explain the diffusion of innovations, ideas, or commercial products.

Opinion leaders play an important role in information flow, because people tend to seek advice from others in the social environment. Information from the mass media does not directly flow to the target audiences, but through a mediation process, in which influential people digest the information and spread it to the public. Opinion leaders have certain characteristics that make them influential in the decision-making process and the behavior of the public. Through knowledge sharing, opinion leaders may help others do jobs better, facilitate personal development and improve personal recognition.

According to Yufu Kuwashima, an opinion leader's power and influence come from the network their followers create. Dedicated supporters reinforce the leader's messaging to other media consumers, strengthening their influence. If one were to remove the opinion leader there would still be a network of connected users that could share ideas with one another. An opinion leader has constructed this network, but the ability to influence others lies in the network itself. In order to effectively influence the opinion of followers, they must find the leader to be above them.

== Types ==
Merton distinguishes two types of opinion leadership: monomorphic and polymorphic. Typically, opinion leadership is viewed as a monomorphic, domain-specific measure of individual differences, that is, a person that is an opinion leader in one field may be a follower in another field. An example of a monomorphic opinion leader in the field of computer technology, might be a neighborhood computer service technician. The technician has access to far more information on this topic than the average consumer and has the requisite background to understand the information, though the same person might be a follower at another field (for example sports) and ask others for advice. In contrast, polymorphic opinion leaders are able to influence others in a broad range of domains. Variants of polymorphic opinion leadership include market mavenism, personality strength and generalized opinion leadership. So far, there is little consensus as to the degree these concepts operationalize the same or simply related constructs.

== Characteristics ==
In his article "The Two Step Flow of Communication", Elihu Katz, found opinion leaders to have more influence on people's opinions, actions, and behaviors than the media. Opinion leaders are seen to have more influence than the media for a number of reasons. Opinion leaders are seen as trustworthy and non-purposive. People do not feel they are being tricked into thinking a certain way about something if they get information from someone they know. However, the media can be seen as forcing a concept on the public and therefore will be less influential. While the media can act as a reinforcing agent, opinion leaders have a more changing or determining role in an individual's opinion or action.

This does not mean that opinion leaders can be always easily used by external agents to promote what they want to promote. Influential individuals might not be willing to change their behavior and may even lose their opinion leader status, if they do.

== Factors for leadership ==
In his article, Elihu Katz answers the question, "Who is an opinion leader?" One or more of these factors make noteworthy opinion leaders:

1. expression of values;
2. professional competence;
3. nature of their social network.

There are personal characteristics that make up an opinion leader. Opinion leaders are individuals who obtain more media coverage than others and are especially educated on a certain issue. Opinion leaders that utilize social media are more likely to be introverted. Introverts don't receive as much interpersonal interaction offline. They can compensate by creating a controllable network of followers to interact with and gain recognition from in a social context. Opinion leaders seek the acceptance of others and are especially motivated to enhance their social status. Public individualism is the idea that an individual will act different from others because they are different. Kenny K. Chan and Shekhar Misra found opinion leaders possess this trait. "The individuation process and this personal-influence process both involve a reciprocal interchange which involve a willingness to stand out in a group situation." An opinion leader's willingness to stand out is what sets them apart from their followers. In the jargon of public relations, they are called thought leaders. Research has also found that opinion leaders tend to be boundary spanners.

In relation to their followers, opinion leaders maintain a particular degree of separation in terms of socio-economic status. According to Gershon Feder and Sara Savastano, it is not effective for leaders to be a part of the same socio-economic status as followers. "opinion leaders who are superior to followers, but not excessively so, are more effective in transmitting knowledge." Meanwhile the leader must be close enough in standing to relate to the followers they want to influence.

== Examples ==
In a strategic attempt to engage the public in environmental issues and his nonprofit, The Climate Project, Al Gore used the concept of opinion leaders. Gore found opinion leaders by recruiting individuals who were educated on environmental issues and saw themselves as influential in their community and amongst their friends and family. From there, he trained the opinion leaders on the information he wanted them to spread and enabled them to influence their communities. By using opinion leaders, Gore was able to educate and influence many Americans to take notice of climate change and change their actions.

Matthew Nisbet describes the use of opinion leaders as intermediaries between scientists and the public as a way to reach the public via trained individuals who are more closely engaged with their communities, such as "teachers, business leaders, attorneys, policymakers, neighborhood leaders, students, and media professionals." Examples of initiatives that take this approach include science and engineering ambassadors sponsored by the National Academy of Sciences, and science booster clubs coordinated by the National Center for Science Education.

With the spread of social media, the opinion-leadership construct has been adapted in marketing as influencer marketing, in which brands collaborate with high-engagement users on platforms such as Instagram and YouTube to reach niche audiences. Empirical research on Instagram has linked perceived opinion leadership of digital creators to followers' brand attitudes and purchase intentions.

== See also ==
- Caciquism
- Consumer behaviour
- Influencer marketing
- Marketing
- Public opinion
- Audience capture
