= Magic bullet theory =

Magic bullet theory may refer to:

- Single-bullet theory, a theory relating to the assassination of John F Kennedy
- Hypodermic needle model, a theory of a direct effect of the mass media on audiences
