= Boundary spanning =

Term in social science research

In social science research and organizational psychology, boundary spanning is a term to describe individuals within an innovation system who have, or adopt, the role of linking the organization's internal networks with external sources of information. While the term was coined by Tushman, the concept was being developed by social scientists from the late 1950s onwards. Most of the early work was conducted in large American corporations with well-established R&D laboratories. The term has since been used in relation to more general innovation networks.

== Background ==
The post-WWII years saw the burgeoning of the American corporation and a subsequent increased interest in improving the efficiency of these workplaces to maximize productivity. However, workers tend to become siloed in their various specialties, making cross-boundary communication and collaboration a challenge. Organizational theorist Tushman noted that "”one critical aspect of the innovation process is the ability of the innovating unit to gather information from and transmit information to several external domains” but that “communication across organizational boundaries is both inefficient and prone to bias and distortion”." Identifying and utilizing boundary spanning individuals in organizations ranging from corporations to academia to healthcare has become a point of focus for communications researchers as well as industrial-organizational (I/O) psychologists.

== Academic adoption ==
The concept of a boundary spanning role has been popular throughout academic research into innovation systems with over 48,000 peer-reviewed articles referencing the term since 1958. With the exception of closed systems, all systems have a transference across their boundaries and this process is facilitated by the boundary spanner. As models of innovation developed, the role of the boundary spanner remained key in seeking out and bringing new ideas into the system or sub-system. Research has also found that boundary spanners tend to be opinion leaders. The role of the boundary spanner is defined largely by where the boundary is drawn.

=== Internal boundary spanners ===
One challenge within the field of knowledge management is that the collection and codification of explicit knowledge into tacit knowledge is frequently held in silos within the organization. Boundary spanners are needed to move that knowledge around the organization in a process sometimes referred to as socialization. Also, with increased interest in promoting diversity, equity, and inclusion (DEI) in the workplace, it has been argued that boundary spanners performing extra tasks because of their various identities (such as serving on a disproportionate number of committees, more mentoring duties, and other DEI-related work) should be recognized and compensated more for this additional effort. Extra work without recognition only serves to reinforce existing imbalances of power and underrepresentation of minority identities that boundary spanners can help improve.

=== External boundary spanners ===
In business administration, boundary spanning is a key element in the acquisition capacity of a firm in Cohen's theory of absorptive capacity. In spheres such as science communication and political outreach, boundary spanning individuals can engender trust in communities generally underserved and overlooked by those in power. They can be particularly effective communicators because of their competence in a certain area in addition to shared values, language, and priorities with the community they are serving, in a way that outgroup academic researchers and political elites cannot.

=== Individual boundary spanners ===
At the individual level, this may be equated to the Resource Investigator role within Belbin's Team Inventory.

== Broader adoption ==
The term boundary spanning is now widely used to describe any situation where an individual crosses the boundaries of a social group to enable knowledge exchange, translate language, and share values among various groups.
