= Frederick S. Jaffe =

American pro-abortion rights activist

Frederick S. Jaffe (1925–1978) was a vice president of Planned Parenthood Federation of America, and founder of what is now the Guttmacher Institute. He was an advocate for increasing the availability of family planning services in the United States. Through his publications and consultations Jaffe argued for birth control as a matter of health and human rights. He was instrumental in developing public support for federal financing of family planning programs, among them the landmark Title X of the Public Health Service Act, passed by Congress in 1970. For his contributions to public health Jaffe was elected to the Institute of Medicine of the National Academy of Sciences in September 1977.

== Life ==
Jaffe was born in Queens, New York City on November 27, 1925, and died of a heart attack on August 16, 1978 in New York City. After service in the Army Air Force (1944–1946), he completed his bachelor's degree in Economics at Queens College in 1947. Subsequently establishing himself as a journalist, he then joined the Planned Parenthood Federation of America as associate director of its Information and Education Department, later becoming Vice President for Program Planning and Development. In 1968 he established the Center for Family Planning Program Development, the research and public policy arm of PPFA, along with Dr. Alan Guttmacher, then president of PPFA. The organization was named after Guttmacher in 1974, with Jaffe as President, and spun off from Planned Parenthood in 1977.

Jaffe served as director of the Family Planning Perspectives journal published by the Guttmacher Institute.

Jaffe also consulted with other organizations, among them the National Center for Health Statistics, the National Institutes of Health, the Commission on Population Growth and the American Future, and the Ford and Rockefeller Foundations. He was posthumously awarded both the Margaret Sanger Award, Planned Parenthood's highest award, and The Carl S. Shultz Award for Lifetime Achievement from the American Public Health Association. Upon the latter presentation, the Population Section of the APHA passed the following resolution:

"The Population Section of the APHA records its deep sorrow over the untimely passing of Frederick S. Jaffe, President of The Alan Guttmacher Institute. Mr. Jaffe, both through his organization and as an individual, was instrumental in the conceptualization of a national family planning program and in its later development and implementation. The Alan Guttmacher Institute, which he founded, reflects Mr. Jaffe's commitment to the production and use of the requisite research and analysis for making informed decisions about fertility-related services and domestic population policies.
"Mr. Jaffe's death is a loss not only to those of us in the population and family planning field but also in the public health arena at large. He worked tirelessly to insure that all people regardless of income, age, race, sex or residence have full access to the reproductive health and social services to which they are entitled."

Jaffe died of a heart attack at the Planned Parenthood offices in New York City on August 18, 1978 at the age of 52. He left behind a wife, Phyllis and three sons.

== The "Jaffe Memo" ==
In 1969, Jaffe wrote a memorandum, requested by Bernard Berelson, head of the Population Council, reviewing then-current ideas for population control from a wide range of organizations and individuals and providing a common methodology to evaluate those ideas and their potential impact. The memorandum included a table that compiled and classified many of these wide-ranging ideas. The table was included as one exhibit in an extensively-sourced 1970 journal article that reviewed then current literature on U.S. population growth and family planning.

The original memo is available online or in the record of a 1973 Senate hearing.

The version of the table published in the journal article was then detached from the article, and characterized in testimony by a witness before the 1973 Senate hearing as the memorandum itself.

Over the years, other parties have presented the table, sometimes in amended or incomplete form, and circulated it by itself as "the Jaffe-Berelson Memorandum" or "the Jaffe Memo". The table has been cited to accuse Jaffe—and by implication, Planned Parenthood—of supporting such measures as compulsory abortions or sterilizations.

Despite these accusations, the coercive items listed in the table were not advocated in the memorandum in the journal article or the thinking of Jaffe; or his work as an official of Planned Parenthood. In the memorandum, Jaffe stated: "the achievement of a society in which effective contraception is efficiently distributed to all, based on present voluntary norms, would either result in a tolerable rate of growth, or go very far to achieving it. If this hypothesis is basically confirmed, it would negate the need for an explicit U.S. population policy which goes beyond voluntary norms." (p. 4)

In writing to Senator Alan Cranston in 1973, Jaffe stated that "the memorandum makes clear that neither I nor the Planned Parenthood Federation of America advocates any of the specific proposals embodied in the table which go beyond voluntary actions of individual couples to space and limit births."

== Publications ==
=== Books ===
- The Complete Book of Birth Control, with Alan F. Guttmacher and Winfield Best. New York: Ballantine Books, 1961.
- Planning Your Family: The Complete Guide to Birth Control, Overcoming Infertility, Sterilization, with a Special Section on Abortion, with Alan F. Guttmacher and Winfield Best. New York: Macmillan, 1964.
- "Birth Control and Love. The Complete Guide to Contraception and Fertility". Annals of Internal Medicine. 70 (5): 1056. May 1969. doi:10.7326/0003-4819-70-5-1056_5.
- Greep, R. O.; Koblinsky, M. A.; Jaffe, F. S. (1976). "Reproduction and Human Welfare: A Challenge to Research". BioScience. 26 (11): 677–684. doi:10.2307/1297392. JSTOR 1297392. PMID 1017535.
- Impact of Family Planning Programs on Fertility: The US Experience, with Phillips Cutright. Santa Barbara, CA: Praeger, 1977.
- Abortion Politics: Private Morality and Public Policy, with Barbara L. Lindheim and Philip R. Lee. New York: McGraw-Hill, 1981.

=== Articles ===
- Jaffe, F S (June 1966). "Financing family planning services". American Journal of Public Health and the Nation's Health. 56 (6): 912–917. doi:10.2105/AJPH.56.6.912. PMC 1257099. PMID 5949320.
- Jaffe, F S (April 1968). "A strategy for implementing family planning services in the United States". American Journal of Public Health and the Nation's Health. 58 (4): 713–725. doi:10.2105/ajph.58.4.713. PMC 1228383. PMID 5689321.
- Harkavy, Oscar; Jaffe, Frederick S.; Wishik, Samuel M. (1969). "Family Planning and Public Policy: Who Is Misleading Whom?". Science. 165 (3891): 367–373. Bibcode:1969Sci...165..367H. doi:10.1126/science.165.3891.367. JSTOR 1727552. PMID 5789434.
- Jaffe, Frederick S. (1973). "Public Policy on Fertility Control". Scientific American. 229 (1): 17–23. Bibcode:1973SciAm.229a..17J. doi:10.1038/scientificamerican0773-17. JSTOR 24923143. PMID 4723144.
- Levison, Carole K.; Jaffe, Frederick S. (1973). "LETTERS". Scientific American. 229 (5): 8–11. Bibcode:1973SciAm.229c...8.. doi:10.1038/scientificamerican0973-8. JSTOR 24923236.
- Jaffe, Frederick S. (1974). "Low-Income Families: Fertility in 1971-1972". Family Planning Perspectives. 6 (2): 108–110. doi:10.2307/2134151. JSTOR 2134151. PMID 4461294.
- Jaffe, Frederick S. (1974). "Fertility Control Policy, Social Policy and Population Policy in an Industrialized Country". Family Planning Perspectives. 6 (3): 164–169. doi:10.2307/2134129. JSTOR 2134129. PMID 4463010.
- Jaffe, F. S. (1974). "Alan F. Guttmacher 1898-1974". Family Planning Perspectives. 6 (1): 1–2. JSTOR 2133613. PMID 4617686.
- Jaffe, Frederick S (July 1975). "Knowledge, perception, and change: notes on a fragment of social history". Mount Sinai Journal of Medicine. 42 (4): 286–99. hdl:123456789/28761. PMID 1097901.
- Jaffe, Frederick S. (1977-09-15). "The Pill: A Perspective for Assessing Risks and Benefits". New England Journal of Medicine. 297 (11): 612–614. doi:10.1056/NEJM197709152971113. PMID 887121.
- Jaffe, Frederick S. (1978). "Enacting Religious Beliefs in a Pluralistic Society". The Hastings Center Report. 8 (4): 14–16. doi:10.2307/3560969. JSTOR 3560969.
