= Uses and gratifications theory =

Theory stating that audiences have power over their media consumption

Uses and gratifications theory is a communication theory that describes the reasons and means by which people seek out media to meet specific needs. The theory postulates that media is a highly available product, that audiences are the consumers of the product, and that audiences choose media to satisfy given needs as well as social and psychological uses, such as knowledge, relaxation, social relationships, and diversion.

Uses and gratifications theory was developed from a number of prior communication theories and research conducted by fellow theorists. The theory has a heuristic value because it gives communication scholars a "perspective through which a number of ideas and theories about media choice, consumption, and even impact can be viewed".

== History ==
=== 1940s: Basic premise ===
Beginning in the 1940s, researchers began to see patterns under the perspective of the uses and gratifications theory in radio listeners. Early research was concerned with topics such as children's use of comics and the absence of newspapers during a newspaper strike. An interest in more psychological interpretations emerged during this time period. By 1944, researchers began to look into the earliest forms of uses and gratifications with their work classifying the reasons why people chose specific types of media. Herta Herzog interviewed various soap opera fans and was able to identify three types of gratifications based on why people listened to soap operas: emotional, wishful thinking, and learning. Then, in 1948, Harold Lasswell introduced a four-functional interpretation of the media on a macro-sociological level: media served the functions of surveillance, correlation, entertainment and cultural transmission for both society and individuals.

According to Richard West and Lynn Turner, UGT is an extension of Maslow's Hierarchy of Needs that argues that people actively look to satisfy their needs based on a hierarchy. These needs are organized as a pyramid with the largest, most fundamental needs at the base and the need for self-actualization at the top. Wilbur Schramm developed the fraction of selection, a formula for determining which form of mass media an individual would select. The formula helped to decide the amount of gratification an individual would expect to gain from the medium over how much effort they had to make to achieve gratification. Elihu Katz, Jay Blumler, and Michael Gurevitch synthesized that UGT's approach was focused on "the social and psychological origins of needs, which generate expectations of the mass media or other sources, which lead to differential patterns of media exposure (or engagement in other activities), resulting in need gratifications and some other consequences, perhaps mostly unintended ones."

=== 1960-70s: Five assumptions proposed ===
In 1969 Jay Blumler and Denis McQuail studied the 1964 election in the United Kingdom by examining people's motives for watching certain political programs on television. By categorizing the audience's motives for viewing a certain program, they aimed to understand any potential mass-media effects by classifying viewers according to their needs. The audience motivations they were able to identify helped lay the groundwork for their research in 1972 and eventually uses and gratifications theory. McQuail, Blumler and Joseph Brown suggested that the uses of different types of media could be grouped into 4 categories: diversion, personal relationships, personal identity, surveillance (i.e. forms of information seeking).

McQuail, Blumler and Brown were joined in their media exploration by Elihu Katz, Michael Gurevitch and Hadassah Haas, and their collaborative research began to indicate how people saw the mass media. A 1974 study by Katz, Blumler, and Gurevitch stated five basic assumptions for a framework for understanding the correlation between media and audiences. These assumptions are:

1. The audience is conceived as active..
2. In the mass communication process, much initiative in linking gratification and media choice lies with the audience member.
3. The media compete with other sources of satisfaction.
4. Methodologically speaking, many of the goals of mass media use can be derived from data supplied by individual audience members themselves.
5. Value judgments about the cultural significance of mass communication should be suspended while audience orientations are explored on their own terms.

According to their research, goals for media use can be grouped into five uses. The audience wants to:

1. Be informed or educated
2. Identify with characters of the situation in the media environment
3. Simple entertainment
4. Enhance social interaction
5. Escape from the stresses of daily life

=== Applications of UGT since 1980s ===
Rehman (1983) applied UGT to study the relationship between movie audience expectations and the satisfaction they derived from going to the movies. The following year Alan Rubin identified two main types of television viewers: ritualized (or, habitual) users and instrumental (or, non-habitual) users. Rubin defined the ritualized users as individuals who had a high regard for television, used television often, and primarily used it for the purpose of a diversion. Meanwhile, the instrumental users were defined as having a lower regard for television, did not use it often, and when they would use television it was for the purpose of acquiring information. Mark Levy and Sven Windahl identified three types of audience activity, which they labeled as "preactivity", "duractivity", and "postactivity". Levy and Windahl described preactivity as seeking out certain media to gratify intellectual needs, "duractivity" as focusing on deciphering and interpreting messages, and "postactivity" as seeking out a message for personal or interpersonal benefit.

A year later, in 1985, Levy and Windahl provided a description of what it means to be an "active consumer" of media:

As commonly understood by gratifications researchers, the term "audience activity" postulates a voluntaristic and selective orientation by audiences toward the communication process. In brief, it suggests that media use is motivated by needs and goals that are defined by audience members themselves, and that active participation in the communication process may facilitate, limit, or otherwise influence the gratifications and effects associated with exposure. Current thinking also suggests that audience activity is best conceptualized as a variable construct, with audiences exhibiting varying kinds and degrees of activity.

Then, in 1987, researchers Lewis Donohughe, Philip Palmgreen, and J.D. Rayburn identified four different lifestyle types of television viewers, each with a variety of differences from the degrees to which the audience member watches TV, why they watch it, what their income and gender is, their marriage status, and so on. The four types are: disengaged homemaker, outgoing activist, restrained activist, and working class climber

The most recent interest surrounding UGT is the link between the reason why media is used and the achieved gratification. UGT researchers are developing the theory to be more predictive and explanatory by connecting the needs, goals, benefits, consequences of media consumption and use along with individual factors. Work in UGT was trailblazed by the research of Katz, Blumler, and Gurevitch which built on Herzog's research and caused a paradigm shift from how media influences people to how audiences use media, diminishing the dominance of the limited effects approach to mass media studies.

== Research issues ==
In the 1980s, Palmgreen and Rayburn proposed the model of gratifications sought (GS) and gratifications obtained (GO). GS are the rewards people seek from media, while GO are the rewards people receive from media. In their study, they found that correlations between individual GS and non-corresponding GOs were generally much lower, indicating considerable promise for a sought versus obtained conceptualization of uses and gratifications.

Palmgreen et al. conducted an investigation in 1985 that provides support for a process model of uses and gratifications based upon an expectancy-value approach. Results of the study supported the hypothesis that gratifications obtained are strongly related to the beliefs about media attributes but are not related to evaluations of those attributes. Further, the results demonstrated that gratifications sought and obtained may be measured at the same level of abstraction, contrary to earlier speculation.

== Modern applications ==
The studies of Katz and his colleagues laid a theoretical foundation for building the uses and gratifications approach. Since then, the research on this subject has been strengthened and extended. The current status of uses and gratifications is still based on Katz's first analysis, particularly as new media forms have emerged in an electronic information age when people have more options of media use.

=== Mobile phone usage ===
Mobile phones, a comparatively new technology, have many uses and gratifications attached to them. Due to their nature of mobility, constant access, and options to both add and access content, this field is expanding with new research on the motivations behind using mobile phones. In general, people use mobile phones for the following uses and gratifications: sociability, entertainment, status, immediate access, instrumentality, mobility, and psychological reassurance. Researchers have also identified that the uses and gratifications for contributing mobile content differ from those for retrieving mobile content.

The specific function of text messaging has also been studied to find its uses and gratifications and explore any potential gender differences. Seven uses and gratifications, in order of importance, have been proposed: accessibility, relaxation, escape, entertainment, information seeking, coordination for business, socialization, status seeking. The results also displayed gender differences, implying that social and societal expectations for females around independence and connection were a factor in their uses and gratification seeking. A study on instant messaging found that women chatted longer and for sociability; men chatted for less time per session and for entertainment and relaxation.

=== Internet usage ===
The Internet provides a new and deep field for exploring UGT. It was found to have three main categories of gratifications: content gratification, process gratification, and social gratification. Content uses and gratification include the need for researching or finding specific information or material, which are gratified with content. Process uses and gratification involve the experience of purposeful navigating or random browsing of the Internet in its functional process. Social uses and gratification encompass a wide range of forming and deepening social ties.

Scholars like LaRose utilize UGT to understand Internet usage via a socio-cognitive framework. This reduces uncertainties that arise from homogenizing an Internet audience and explaining media usage in terms of only positive gratifications. LaRose also created measures for self-efficacy and self-disparagement and related UGT to negative outcomes of online behavior, such as internet addiction.

=== Social media usage ===
Whereas basic research finds that socialization motivates use of friend-networking sites, uses and gratifications theory suggests that individual users will continue to be engaged with social networking sites if their gratifications and needs are fulfilled by such tools. Some further exploration has demonstrated that although emotional, cognitive, social, and habitual uses are motivational to use social media, not all uses are consistently gratified. Overall, users have the following motivations: social and affection, need to vent negative feelings, recognition, entertainment, cognitive needs.

Users who share news are motivated by the uses and gratifications of socializing and status seeking, especially if they have had prior experience with social media. Users also engage in cyberbullying in order to fulfil a need to be vengeful and malicious, while avoiding face-to-face contact.

=== Online gaming ===
Achievement, enjoyment and social interaction are all motivations for starting to play an online game, with success at the game and the extent to which gamers' uses were gratified predicting continuance in playing. In 2017, researchers applied UGT to study user behavior among Pokémon Go players. Results show that enjoyment, physical activity, nostalgia, image, normative influences and flow drive various forms of user behavior. In addition, perceived physical risks, but not perceived privacy risks, lead to weaker forms of usage.

=== Entertainment media ===
Research has shown that media taken in for entertainment purposes have a wide range of uses and emotional gratifications, and that these are not mutually exclusive but can overlap with each other. Rehman (1983) demonstrated a relationship between gratifications sought and obtained from the movies and movie attendance. The most prominently cited emotional gratification of media use of mood management. UGT proposes that people prefer to maintain a state of intermediate arousal. When in a bad mood, bored, or over-aroused, people will seek media as regulation for or distraction from their mood. Another emotional gratification is affective disposition, which involves people experiencing gratification when rooting for characters depicted as good and moral. Other emotional gratifications include excitation transfer, sensation seeking, downward social comparison, mood adjustment, and competence.

Additionally, the modes of reception of entertainment media correlates with emotion involvement and can facilitate the pursuit of other goals. Entertainment media allows users to live out gender-socialised roles, satisfy parasocial relationships, live vicariously through fictional characters, and find meaning and purpose.

=== Virtual Workplaces and "Zoom Fatigue" ===
Following the Covid-19 Pandemic which sent almost all employees home during quarantine, many businesses embraced a virtual workplace. Workplaces implemented the use of Zoom, Teams, or other platforms which allowed employees to communicate with each other and work from home, with the option to still see one's co-workers with a camera option. A study published in 2025 by Lim, C., Ratan, R., Foxman, M., Beyea, D., Jeong, D., & Leith, A. P. examines the connection between impression management and the negative self-evaluation stemming from heightened self-monitoring in virtual meetings, which the researchers referred to as "Zoom Fatigue".

This study found that women of color are more susceptible to Zoom Fatigue and report higher levels of dissatisfaction from virtual meetings. Individuals impacted by Zoom Fatigue may experience feelings of anxiety or stress before a virtual meeting, or feeling tired, exhausted, burnt out, or having feelings of despair after the virtual meeting. This can result from too much eye contact, the increased cognitive load, reduced mobility, and the mirror effect (or how the camera inverts one's face while on virtual platforms) which users have to face on the virtual meetings.

The study performed to examine Zoom Fatigue also found that this phenomenon can also negatively impact individuals perceptions of their sense of self. In 2022, another study performed by Ratan, R., Miller, D., and Bailenson, J., examined the correlation between Facial Appearance Dissatisfaction and its impact on Zoom Fatigue. The researchers found that Virtual Meeting fatigue is higher for women than men, Virtual Meeting Fatigue is positively associated with facial dissatisfaction, and that the effects of gender and race on Virtual Meeting Fatigue are mediated by facial dissatisfaction.

=== Online dating ===
With the uprise of technology and social media use, the development and use of dating apps has only increased. The use of Tinder, Hinge, Facebook Dating, and Bumble has continued to rise. Uses and Gratifications theory could help explain the trend of this.

UGT suggests that users will seek out different platforms of media to satisfy their needs. For users of dating apps, these needs might stem from romantic goals and drives, need for social connection, or entertainment. A study performed by Veera Bhatiasevi examined UGT of social media and their impact on social relationships and well-being. The study found that of all generations, Generation Y, or Millennials, use social media the most, with 93.7% of participants who were Generation Y in the study admitting to using social media. Shortly behind Generation Y are Generation X and Generation Z, with 87.9 of Gen X and 87.1 of Gen Z participants admitting to using social media, with only 82.5 of Baby Boomer participants using social media.

A study performed by Li, N., Wang, B., Li, Y., Pang, H., & Han, X. examined the role of technology, social media, and dating apps in the realm with the goal of defining success versus unsuccessful relationships when formed online. Researchers found a correlation between the strength of connections formed online and media literacy, motivation, and knowledge dynamics in today's digital age. In regard to dating, motivation plays a large role in digitally dating, with it significantly impacting attitudes and behaviors.

The Pew Research center examined roles of gender and sexual orientation pertaining to online dating. Researchers found that three-in-ten adults in the United States have used dating apps. They also found that on average, more men use dating apps than women, with 34% of men and 27% of women in the study using dating apps. This may be the result from the Male Loneliness epidemic, a trend where men between the ages of 18 and 34 are experiencing more loneliness than ever before, with rates being 18% higher than women in this age bracket. Applying this to UGT, men who experience loneliness will seek out media to satisfy this need; thus they may resort to using dating apps to experience a connection or to feel less lonely.

=== Artificial Intelligence (AI) ===
Another post-pandemic development is the widespread acceptance and use of Artificial Intelligence, or AI. Platforms such as ChatGPT, Google Gemini, Amazon Web Services (AWS), and Microsoft Copilot have all developed and introduced an AI platform for individuals to utilize in their day-to-day lives.

Uses and Gratifications theory may be able to explain the uprise in this technology and peoples' perception of AI. AI can provide convenient and quick answers to questions or requests provided by the user. This convenience appeals to users and contributes to AI use.

=== Artificial Intelligence (AI) in Education ===
In a study conducted by Campbell Academic Technology Services, researchers looked at use of AI by students in higher education. This study performed from 2024 to 2025 showed that 86% of students use AI in their studies, with 54% of students using AI weekly, and one in four students using it daily. With the uprise of AI use, the Pew Research Center concluded from a study that one in four teachers in the United States say that AI and AI tools are causing more harm than good in K-12 education. Although, AI has a negative connotation when used in academics, the uses of AI are not always negative. Students report using AI to get help with unanswered questions, drafting outlines, brainstorming, and as a space to explore and create.

=== Artificial Intelligence (AI) and Relationships ===
Not only is Artificial Intelligence being used for academics and in academic settings, individuals are also using AI to form new relationships - both platonically and romantically. A study performed in 2025 by Joyce, C. I., Welch, T. S., Knox, D., Adriatik, L., & Tsay, A. C. examined the acceptance of robots; especially in regards to love and companionship. The researchers examined the degree of companionship and intimacy that can be achieved by the inclusion of robots as emotional, intimate, and romantic partners. The study found that of all participants, individuals of Asian descent were most accepting of robot partners, with a M of 10.22. White individuals were least accepting of robot partners as found by the study, with a M of 8.14.

Researchers at Arizona State University examined the use of Amazon's Alexa and the correlation between users' motivations, involvement, and satisfaction. The study found that the motive of users' held a positive correlation between Entertainment and Information. The study also found that the use of Alexa and the satisfaction is linked to cognition and feeling positive emotions.

In addition, recent developments have shown that individuals have started developing relationships with chatbots. This can lead to further social problems for the user, as they would be classified as parasocial relationships - there is no real human behind the relationship itself. These relationships can be positive for some, but dangerous for others.

=== Artificial Intelligence (AI) and UGT ===
All of the different uses of Artificial Intelligence directly correlates to UGT. Every user has a different motivation or use for AI depending on the circumstance which can account for the variety of ways it is used. Whether it is a student looking for a platform to explore and express creativity, a person experiencing loneliness seeking a partner to talk to, or a social media platform developer looking for an answer to customize each user's experience to be unique, the different needs accounts for the different uses of AI amongst individuals.

=== Social Networks ===
More and more social networks are making their way to the App Store for consumers to potentially adopt. With a wide range of social networks to choose from, consumers typically adopt new technologies and platforms by considering factors such as social connections.

In a 2025 study performed by Ahmad, H., Majid Gulzar, M., Ahmed, I., and Khalid, M., researchers discovered that there is a large rise in the role played by social connections in affecting the adoption of technology by the consumer. This directly correlates with the Media Multiplexity theory, which suggests that stronger social ties are positively correlated with the number of social media channels used when communicating.

Another study, performed by Salisu, I., Sappri, M. M., Omar, M. F., Nasir, A., Ejaz, S., & Hossain, M. B. looked forward at the future of communication and platform adoption. They found that users will use social media platforms more frequently and make them their preferred method of communication. In addition, through their adoption, they will promote the use of the social media to others and ultimately get others to adopt new platforms and technologies.

== Related theories ==
=== Media system dependency theory ===
Media system dependency theory (MSDT or media dependency theory) has been studied as an offshoot of UGT. However, media dependency theory focuses on audiences' goals for media consumption as the source of their dependency; while uses and gratification theory focuses on audience's needs as drivers for media consumption. MSDT states that as a person becomes increasingly dependent on media to satisfy their needs, that media will become more important in a person's life and thereby have increased influence and effects on that person. MSDT acknowledges and builds upon UGT because it is based on the assumptions that people have different uses for media that arise from their needs.

=== Social cognitive theory ===
Building on UGT, Social Cognitive Theory helped distinguish GS versus GO stimulus for media consumption. Social cognitive theory explains behavior in terms of the reciprocal causation between individuals, environments, and behaviors. This allows for a more personal application of UGT instead of a large, blanketing assumption about a large audience of mass media. If GO is greater than GS then there will be more audience satisfaction. Lastly, audiences' GS are not always the reality of their GO.

=== Cultivation theory ===
Cultivation theory is concerned with understanding the role that media – specifically television – plays in shaping a person's world view. Whereas UGT tries to understand the motivations that drive media usage, cultivation theory focuses on the psychological effects of media. Cultivation theory is used especially to study violence in television and how it shapes audience's understanding of the reality of violence in society. Often, because of media's influence, audiences have a more heightened and unrealistic perception of the amount of violence. A UGT approach may be implemented to Cultivation theory cases to understand why an audience would seek violent media and if audiences seek television violence to satisfy the need of confirmation of their worldview.

=== Hypodermic needle model ===
Hypodermic needle model (known as the hypodermic-syringe model, transmission-belt model, or magic bullet theory) is a model of communication suggesting that an intended message is directly received and wholly accepted by the receiver. The model was originally rooted in 1930s behaviourism and was largely considered obsolete for a long time, but big data analytics-based mass customisation has led to a modern revival of the basic idea. After that, a shift which rediscovered the relationship between media and people occurred and led to establishment of uses and gratifications approach.

=== Mass media ===
In media studies, mass communication, media psychology, communication theory, and sociology, media influence and media effects are topics relating to mass media and media culture's effects on individual or an audience's thoughts, attitudes, and behavior. Whether it is written, televised, or spoken, mass media reaches a large audience. Mass media's role and effect in shaping modern culture are central issues for study of culture.

== Theory criticism ==
Uses and gratifications theory has, almost since its inception, been viewed critics as not meeting the standards necessary to be a theory. Critics argue that it instead is more of an approach to analysis or a data-collecting strategy. Common criticism include that gratifications are more dependent on input by researchers than on decisions made by research subjects; that early research utilized flawed methodologies that led findings to be overestimated; that audiences of different ages likely have different motivations for using identical media, and also likely have different gratifications; that most research relies on pure recollection of memory rather than data; and that it goes too far in claiming that people are free to choose the media and the interpretations they desire.

As a sociologically based theory, UGT has little to no benefit to psychology due to its weakness in operational definitions and weak analytical mode. It also is focused too narrowly on the individual and neglects the social structure and place of the media in that structure. Ruggiero wrote that "most scholars agree that early research had little theoretical coherence and was primarily behaviorist and individualist in its methodological tendencies." Blumler and other critics have argued that the line between gratification and satisfaction is blurred, and Blumler wrote that "the nature of the theory underlying uses and gratifications research is not totally clear." McQuail criticized the UGT as too cumbersome and tried to do too much, arguing that there is no real way of testing the theory through content analysis or surveys.

Among the most criticized tenets of uses and gratifications as theory is the assumption of an active audience. Ruggerio noted three assumptions necessary to the idea of active audience: First, media selection is initiated by the individual. Second, expectations regarding the use of media must be a product of individual predispositions, social interactions and environmental factors. And third, the active audience exhibits goal-directed behavior. This concept of active audience finds, at best, limited acceptance outside of the United States.

Jay Blumler presented a number of points as to why UGT cannot measure an active audience. He stated, "The issue to be considered here is whether what has been thought about Uses and Gratifications Theory has been an article of faith and if it could now be converted into an empirical question such as: How to measure an active audience?" Blumler then offered suggestions about the kinds of activity the audiences were engaging with in the different types of media: utility, intentionality, selectivity, and imperviousness to influence. In 1973, Blumler, McQuail and Brown extended Lasswell's four groups to include four more primary factors for media usage: diversion, personal relationships, personal identity, and surveillance.

Severin and Tankard also argued that most of the data collection method used in uses and gratification studies are self-report questionnaires, which is not a reliable way to ascertain the genuine reason for using the media because they believe that individuals can not respond accurately to questions about their own feelings and behavior.

== See also ==
- Influence of mass media
- Outline of communication
- Theories of media exposure
