= Hypodermic needle model =

Theory of mass communication

The hypodermic needle model (known as the hypodermic-syringe model, transmission-belt model, or magic bullet theory) is claimed to have been a model of communication in which media consumers were "uniformly controlled by their biologically based 'instincts' and that they react more or less uniformly to whatever 'stimuli' came along".

== Concept ==
People were assumed to be "uniformly controlled by their biologically based 'instincts' and that they react more or less uniformly to whatever 'stimuli' came along". The "Magic Bullet" theory graphically assumes that the media's message is a bullet fired from the "media gun" into the viewer's "head". Similarly, the "Hypodermic Needle Model" uses the same idea of the "shooting" paradigm. It suggests that the media injects its messages straight into the passive audience. This passive audience is immediately affected by these messages. The public essentially cannot escape from the media's influence, and is therefore considered a "sitting duck". Both models suggest that the public is vulnerable to the messages shot at them because of the limited communication tools and the studies of the media's effects on the masses at the time. It means the media explores information in such a way that it injects into the mind of audiences as bullets.

Though the "magic bullet" and "hypodermic needle" models are often credited to Harold Lasswell's 1927 book, Propaganda Technique in the World War, neither term appears in his writing. Rather, Lasswell argued that the rise of political movements across Europe was "an almost inevitable outcome of the isolation of the individual in an atomized society." Recent work in the history of communication studies has documented how the two models may have served as a strawman theory or fallacy or even a "myth". Others have documented the possible medical origins of the metaphor of the magic bullet model.

== Two-step flow ==
The phrasing "hypodermic needle" is meant to give a mental image of the direct, strategic, and planned infusion of a message into an individual. But as research methodology became more highly developed, it became apparent that the media had selective influences on people.

The most famous incident often cited as an example for the hypodermic needle model was the 1938 broadcast of The War of the Worlds and the subsequent reaction of widespread panic among its American mass audience. However, this incident actually sparked the research movement, led by Paul Lazarsfeld and Herta Herzog, that would disprove the magic bullet or hypodermic needle theory, as Hadley Cantril managed to show that reactions to the broadcast were, in fact, diverse, and were largely determined by situational and attitudinal attributes of the listeners.

In the 1940s, Lazarsfeld disproved the "magic bullet" theory and "hypodermic needle model theory" through election studies. Lazarsfeld and colleagues Bernard Berelson and Hazel Gaudet gathered research during the election of Franklin D. Roosevelt in 1940 to determine voting patterns and the relationship between the media and political power, published in the book The People's Choice. They discovered that the majority of the public remained unfazed by propaganda surrounding Roosevelt's campaign. Instead, interpersonal outlets proved more influential than the media. Therefore, Lazarsfeld concluded that the effects of the campaign were not all powerful to the point where they completely persuaded "helpless audiences", a claim that the Magic Bullet, Hypodermic Needle Model, and Lasswell asserted. These new findings also suggested that the public can select which messages affect and don't affect them.

Lazarsfeld's debunking of these models of communication provided the way for new theories of the media's effects on the public. Lazarsfeld introduced the idea of the two-step flow of communication in 1944, further developed in 1955 with Elihu Katz. The model of the two-step flow of communication assumes that ideas flow from the mass media to "opinion leaders" and then to the greater public. Opinion leaders are categorized as individuals with the best understanding of media content and the most accessibility to the media as well. These leaders essentially take in the media's information, and explain and spread the media's messages to others.

Disagreements about the hypodermic needle theory may be based on how audiences are classified. For example, the pro-hypodermic perspective suggests that despite differing types of audiences, the theory remains valid if a direct effect occurs. However, many anti-hypodermic views instead note that the theory can only be applied if the effect works on a similar, mass group of people. Other interpretation differences depend on whether researchers involve mediating and intervening variables in case studies. This may include the influence of an audience’s prior knowledge and background.

Thus, the two step flow model and other communication theories suggest that the media does not directly have an influence on viewers anymore. Instead, interpersonal connections and even selective exposure play a larger role in influencing the public in the modern age. Contemporary research suggests that individuals are more likely to form opinions through the two step flow process, and through the role of influencers and opinion leaders on social media outlets. Social media has become an increasingly individualized experience and process, thus users are likely to form opinions based on the content they are exposed to and interact with.

== Contemporary one-step flow ==
More recently, the use of big data analytics to identify user preferences and to send tailor-made messages to individuals led back to the idea of a "one-step flow of communication", which is in principle similar to the hypodermic needle model. The difference is that today's massive databases allow for the mass customization of messages. So it is not one generic mass media message, but many individualized messages, coordinated by a massive algorithm. For example, empirical studies have found that in Twitter networks, traditional mass media outlets receive 80–90% of their Twitter mentions directly through a direct one-step flow from average Twitter users. However, these same studies also argue that there is a multitude of step-flow models at work in today's digital communication landscape.

== Theory application in the digital age ==
Although the hypodermic needle theory was studied more in depth in the early half of the 20th century, the integration of social media platforms further tests the theory’s application. The invention of the internet and popularity of social media channels makes social interaction a two-way street. Through this, influencers, leaders, politicians, brands and individuals can communicate with one another. This social relationship has led to behavior changes in the digital age, some of which align with characteristics of the hypodermic needle theory.

The hypodermic needle theory is based purely on assumptions about human behaviors. But, contemporary research adds that these behaviors and methods are always evolving and changing. In the field of science and information technology, researchers suggest using social media literacy as a tool for combating passive media consumption. They suggest increasing critical thinking use, and questioning the validity and credibility of what is on social media platforms. Similarly, contemporary research considers libraries and information centers as a form of media because of their influence over knowledge and source selection.

== See also ==
- Agenda-setting theory
- Media effects theory
- Meme
