= Matthew Nisbet =

American Communication scholar

Matthew C. Nisbet
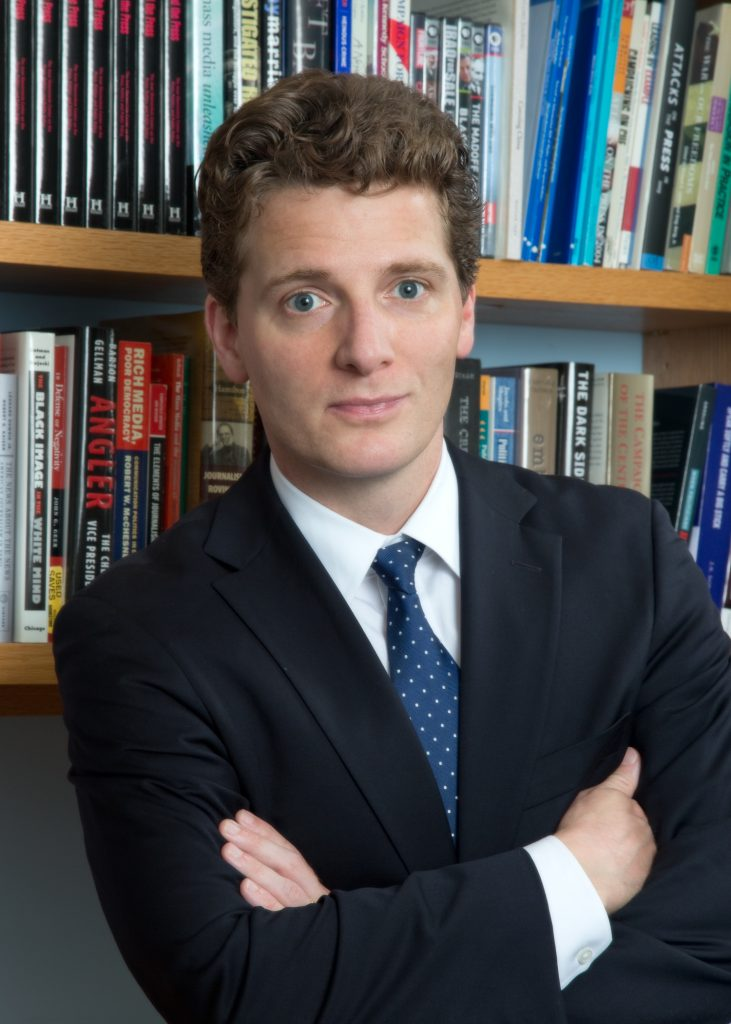
- Nisbet in 2012
- Born: Buffalo
- Occupation: Professor of Communication

Academic background
- Education: Cornell University

Academic work
- Discipline: Communications and Public Policy
- Sub-discipline: Environmental communication
- Institutions: Northeastern University
- Notable works: The Oxford Encyclopedia of Climate Change Communication
- Website: matthewnisbet.org

Matthew C. Nisbet is a professor of Communications and Public Policy at Northeastern University. He is the former Editor-in-Chief of Environmental Communication and Senior Editor of the Oxford Encyclopedia of Climate Change Communication. His columns regularly appear in science periodicals.

== Education and teaching ==
Nisbet grew up in Buffalo. He earned his M.S. and Ph.D., both in Communications, at Cornell University, after a B.A. at Dartmouth College.

After graduation in 1996, he worked at the Public Interest Research Group on a campaign reform initiative and at the Center for Inquiry in Buffalo. These experiences motivated him to enroll in graduate studies to explore the relationship between politics, the media and public communications, which he did in 1999. His minor at Dartmouth was in Environment Studies and he eventually settled upon climate change as a special area of interest. He advocates for more focus on the local impact on public health in communications about climate change, as a way to engage a larger segment of the public and more stakeholders.

Since 2017, he has been Professor of Communication, Policy and Urban Affairs at Northeastern University, where he started teaching in 2014. Previously, he taught at the American University and Ohio State University.

== Author and editor ==
Nisbet was the Editor-in-Chief for Environmental Communication from 2016 to 2019. Since 2014, he has been Senior Editor or Editor-in-Chief of the Oxford Encyclopedia of Climate Change Communication. He's a member of the advisory board of the journal Public Understanding of Science.

His regular column appears in Issues in Science Technology magazine and he is a contributor to Scientific American.

With other researchers and with the Boston Area Research Initiative, Nisbet is analyzing how media outlets cover climate change in coastal cities. With co-author Declan Fahy, he is preparing a book on the influence on the public of some intellectuals, such as Laurie Garrett and Malcolm Gladwell.

Nisbet has been made a Fellow of the Committee for Skeptical Inquiry in 2020.

== Selected publications ==
- Nisbet, Matthew C.; Nisbet, Erik C. (2019). The Public Face of Science Across the World. Cambridge: American Academy of Arts and Science. ISBN 0-87724-127-9.
- Nisbet, Matthew C., ed. (2018). The Oxford Encyclopedia of Climate Change Communication. Oxford University Press. ISBN 9780190498986.
- Nisbet, Matthew C. (27 March 2018). Strategic philanthropy in the post-Cap-and-Trade years Reviewing U.S. climate and energy foundation funding. Wiley. doi:10.1002/wcc.524.
