= Hazel Gaudet-Erskine =

American social and communications scientist

Hazel Gaudet-Erskine (October 15, 1908 — July 10, 1975) was an American social and communications scientist and a member of the Princeton Radio Project.

== Life ==
Hazel Gaudet was born on October 15, 1908. She studied psychology at George Washington University and was a pioneer in audience and opinion research. She was part of the Princeton Radio Project at the School of Public and International Affairs at Princeton University. In 1940 she got married and moved to Reno, Nevada, turning her back on research to devote herself to political and social work. Between 1961 and 1975 she wrote the column The Polls, which appeared regularly in the Public Opinion Quarterly. On July 10, 1975, Gaudet-Erskine died as a result of a serious illness.

== Scientific career ==
Hazel Gaudet was an early member of the Princeton Radio Project at Princeton University, before moving to Columbia University to work at the Bureau of Applied Social Research. There, the social and communication scientist was mainly responsible for administration and data analysis. She also recruited and trained young interviewers and conducted some interviews herself. As a member of the Princeton Radio Project, she was also instrumental in co-authoring The Office of Radio's first two studies: The Invasion from Mars (1940) and The People's Choice (1944).

Following this work, she worked as an analyst in the Surveying Division of the Office of War Information (OWI) in New York and London, where she led some research into the effectiveness of war propaganda.

In addition, she worked in the research department of the Columbia Broadcasting System (CBS) and assisted Charles Wright Mills in his studies on the role of union leaders, which was published in 1948 under the name The New Man of Power.

== The Invasion from Mars ==
The 1940 study The Invasion from Mars is dedicated to the study of reactions after the performance of the 1938 radio drama The War of the Worlds. In communication science, this study is considered one of the key works of media impact research. Four people initially played an important role in the project: Paul Lazarsfeld, Hadley Cantril, Herta Herzog and Hazel Gaudet. While Lazarsfeld and Cantril negotiated with the leaders of the Rockefeller Foundation for research funding, Herzog and Gaudet were responsible for organizing and analyzing the results. Herzog conducted a series of interviews with the radio play listeners. Gaudet was responsible for administrating the research project and the statistical analysis of the entire data. Although the two women apparently made the largest contribution to the study, Hadley Cantril is still called the main author of the work, whereas Gaudet and Herzog are usually mentioned only briefly as employees.

The study interviewed 135 people. Subsequently, 100 respondents who had reacted in panic were selected. The aim of the study was to explain the reasons for the partly panic reactions to The War of the Worlds radio play. In analyzing the results, the listeners could be classified into 4 different types:

1. Listeners who tested the inner evidence of the radio play.
2. Listeners who checked the program with other information and learned that it was a radio play.
3. Listeners who tried to check the program with other information, but for various reasons still believed that the program was an authentic newscast.
4. Listeners who made no attempt to check the broadcast or the events.

For one, a lot of those who panicked believed what they heard without questioning it. On the other hand, the authors saw the reason for the panic in the fact that some switched on too late, thereby ignoring the announcement that it was a Halloween joke. Furthermore, the three scientists analyzed which characteristics of the reception situation and which personal characteristics of the listener led to increased anxiety potential. They found that the lack of ability to think critically and question the information was critical to their response. However, according to the study, critical thinking could be overridden by a high degree of suggestibility and emotional insecurity.

=== Journalistic work ===
Gaudet-Erskine's experience with public opinion benefited her in 1961, when she was given the task of restoring 'The Polls' as a regular column in Public Opinion Quarterly. Before she took over the column, 'The Polls' consisted mainly of a list of survey results on a variety of topics without further analysis, interpretations or historical context. Gaudet-Erskine chose a contemporary theme for each issue and prepared it with survey data, analysis and opinion trends. Above all, she dealt with controversial issues of the time: civil rights, women's roles in society, freedom of expression, religion and social assistance programs, etc.

=== Political activism ===
With her move to Reno, Nevada Gaudet-Erskine became more politically and socially engaged. One of her first politically motivated actions was to get support for the ADC (Aid to Dependent Children) program. At the time, Nevada was the only state that did not participate in the government-sponsored program. In 1955, the legislature finally voted for Nevada to join.

At the same time, Gaudet-Erskine was increasingly advocating better social services for old and blind people and transferring responsibility for social assistance from individual counties to the state level.

In the years 1952 and 1956 she has an active role in Adlai Stevenson's two presidential campaigns. Two years later she worked for the later governor of Nevada Grant Sawyer. In this context, Gaudet-Erskine traveled to Nevada's all 17 counties to get the necessary support for Sawyer. Gaudet-Erskine took over the organization, planning and analysis of Sawyer's campaigns. In the course of this activity, she was able to benefit from her academic career as a pollster and the techniques learned there. As an associate and advisor to Governor Grant Sawyer, she helped him use women and minority representatives in political positions. She was also a member of the social committee of the state of Nevada.

In 1966, she organized the first meetings of the American Civil Liberties Union (ACLU) Nevada in her own living room until the organization became established. In 1970, she was elected Nevada's representative on ACLU's national board. In addition, she occupied important positions in the Biennial Conference Committees between 1992 and 1994 and the Nominating Committee 1975.

== Homages ==
Since 2015 the American Political Science Association gives the Hazel Gaudet Erskine Political Psychology Career Achievement Award, honoring remarkable people in the field of political psychology.

== Publications ==
- Hadley Cantril, Hazel Gaudet: Familiarity as a factor in determining the selection and enjoyment of radio programs. In: Journal of Applied Psychology. 23, Nr. 1, 1939, S. 85–94.
- Hazel Gaudet: The favorite radio program. In: Journal of Applied Psychology. 23, Nr. 1, 1939, S. 115–126.
- Hadley Cantril, Hazel Gaudet, Herta Herzog: The Invasion from Mars. Princeton University Press, Princeton 1940.
- Hazel Gaudet: High School Students Judge Radio Programs. In: Education. 60, 1940, S. 639–646.
- Hazel Gaudet, Elmo C. Wilson: Who escapes the personal investigator. In: Journal of Applied Psychology. 24, Nr. 6, 1939, S. 85–94.
- Paul F. Lazarsfeld, Hazel Gaudet: Who gets a job? In: Sociometry. 41, Nr. 1, 1941, S. 64–77.
- Paul F. Lazarsfeld, Bernard Berelson, Hazel Gaudet: The People's Choice: How the Voter makes up his mind in a presidential campaign. Duell und Sloan, New York 1948.
- Hazel Erskine-Gaudet: A Revival: Reports from the Polls. In: Public Opinion Quarterly. 25, Nr. 1, 1961, S. 128–139

Between 1961 and 1975 Hazel Erskine Gaudet wrote 'The Polls', a regular column in the Public Opinion Quarterly.
