= Bernard Berelson =

American behavioral scientist (1912–1979)

- Born: 1912
- Died: 1979 (aged 66–67)
- Occupation: Behavioral scientist

Bernard Reuben Berelson (1912–1979) was an American behavioral scientist, known for his work on communication, mass media and public libraries.

He was a leading proponent of the broad idea of the "behavioral sciences", a field he saw as including areas such as public opinion. In Chapter 14 of Voting (1954), he enunciated what has become known as Berelson's paradox on democracy: while classical theories of its success assume voters committed to interest in public life, this fails to correspond with practical politics, while the system itself functions.

Berelson wrote a summary entitled The Great Debate on Cultural Democracy regarding the confrontation between mass society theorists and researchers for the media industries. Berelson asserted that the resolution of the debate was simple: just listen to mass communication researchers like himself as they develop useful answers to the issues raised by others.

== Life ==
Born in Spokane, Washington, he majored in English at Whitman College, graduating in 1934. He took a library science degree at the University of Washington in 1936 and an English master's there in 1937. Completing a doctoral degree at the University of Chicago Graduate Library School in 1941, under the influence of Douglas Waples, led him into the field of public opinion.

During World War II Berelson was an analyst of German opinion and morale with the Foreign Broadcast Intelligence Service.

In 1944, he began working in applied social research at Columbia University. Berelson returned to the University of Chicago in 1946 as professor and dean of the Graduate Library School. While there he wrote The Library's Public with Lester Asheim, which was part of The Public Library Inquiry.

In 1952 became head of the Center for Advanced Studies in the Behavioral Sciences set up by the Ford Foundation at Stanford University. He moved back to Chicago in 1957 and then to Columbia in 1960.

Berelson was elected a Fellow of the American Academy of Arts and Sciences in 1962. The same year, he joined the Population Council, eventually becoming its President.

== The Jaffe Memo ==
In recent years a 1969 memo written by Frederick S. Jaffe has been a source of controversy. The memo, written to Berelson while he was head of the Population Council, included a table that summarized many proposals from various sources regarding population control. This table contained proposals such as compulsory abortions and sterilizations, encouraging homosexuality, forcing women to work, and other controversial notions. In point of fact, however, Jaffe's table was included in a report by a Planned Parenthood official that worked for Jaffe, that said "The report was prepared in behalf of Planned Parenthood's Population Education Staff Committee as a basis for discussion of and action on the U.S. population problem by the Planned Parenthood national organization."

Furthermore, just two years later, Berelson and Jaffe would work together on the 1972 Rockefeller Commission Report. Many of the ideas discussed in the memorandum were incorporated into the Rockefeller Report. So, while it is true that Jaffe's memorandum was primarily for purposes of laying out options for discussion, it is not true that Jaffe, Berelson, or Planned Parenthood, had no intention of acting on those proposals. Critics contend that the value of the memo is in revealing the lengths that population control advocates, including Berelson and Jaffe, were willing to go.

The original memorandum is available online.

== Works ==
- Berelson, Bernard (October 1938). "The Myth of Library Impartiality: An Interpretation for Democracy". Wilson Bulletin for Librarians. 13 (2): 87–90.
- What Reading Does to People. A Summary of Evidence on the Social Effects of Reading and a Statement of Problems for Research. (1940), with Douglas Waples and Franklyn R. Bradshaw
- The People's Choice (1944) with Paul F. Lazarsfeld and Hazel Gaudet
- Reader in Public Opinion and Communication (1950) with Morris Janowitz
- Berelson, Bernard; Lester Asheim (1949). The Library's Public: A Report of the Public Library Inquiry. New York: Columbia University Press. doi:10.7312/bere93730.
- Content Analysis in Communication Research (1952) - first textbook on content analysis
- Voting: a study of opinion formation in a presidential campaign with Paul F. Lazarsfeld and William N. McPhee
- The Behavioral Sciences Today (1963)
- Human Behavior: An Inventory of Scientific Findings (1964) with Gary Steiner
- Geneva, 1965. Family planning and population programs. A review of world developments
- National Programmes in Family Planning. Achievements and Problems. (1969) editor
- Graduate Education in the United States
- "The Great Debate on Cultural Democracy"
