= Elihu Katz =

American and Israeli sociologist (1926–2021)

- אליהוא כ"ץ
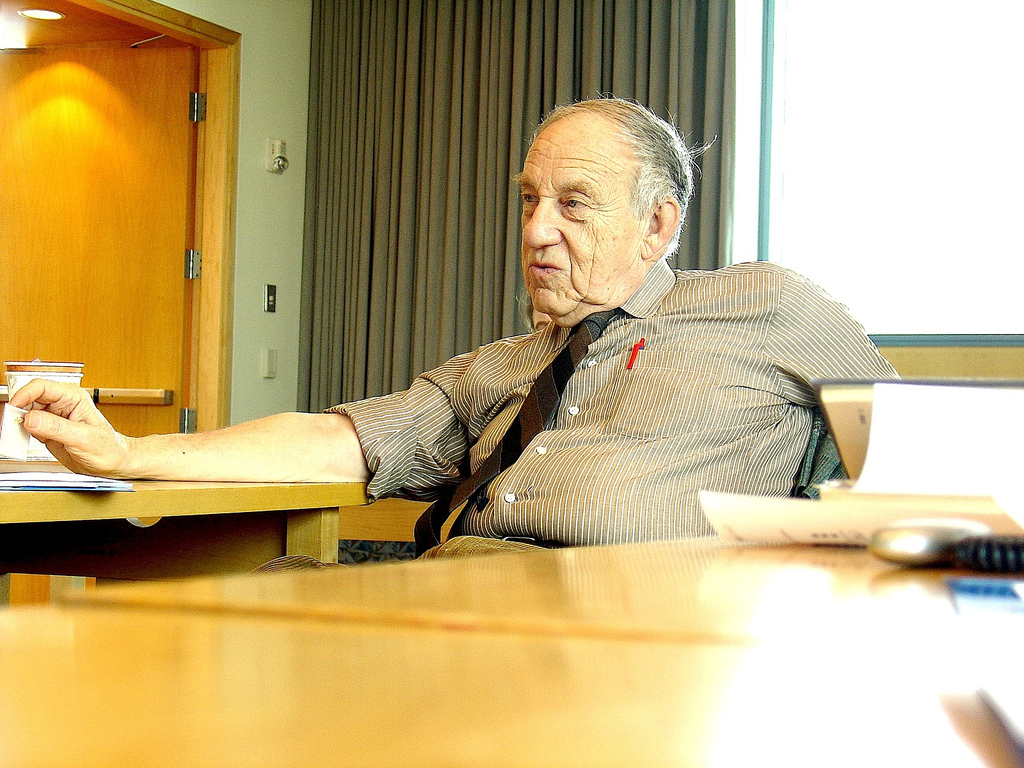
- Elihu Katz
- Born: 21 May 1926; New York City, New York, U.S.
- Died: 31 December 2021 (aged 95); Jerusalem, Israel
- Education: Columbia University (BA, MA, PhD)
- Occupations: Sociologist and communication scientist

Elihu Katz (Hebrew: אליהוא כ"ץ; 21 May 1926 – 31 December 2021) was an American-Israeli sociologist and communication scientist whose expertise was uses and gratifications theory. He authored over 20 books and 175 articles and book chapters during his lifetime and is acknowledged as one of "the founding fathers of regular television broadcasts in Israel."

== Biography ==
Born in Brooklyn, New York, Elihu Katz graduated from Midwood High School in 1944 and then served in the Army for three years. He received his bachelor's, master's, and doctorate degrees from Columbia University.

Katz died in Jerusalem on 31 December 2021, at the age of 95, survived by his wife Ruth, a musicologist and professor emerita at Hebrew University, two sons, and their families.

He is interred at Jerusalem's Har Hamenuhot Cemetery.

== Academic career ==
He is known for his work with Paul Lazarsfeld in the field of mass communication, most notably for developing the theory of the two-step flow of communication detailed in the book, Personal Influence: The Part Played by People in the Flow of Mass Communication. Additional works include: Medical Innovation: A Diffusion Study, The Export of Meaning: Cross-Cultural Readings of Dallas and Media Events: The Live Broadcasting of History.

Katz was emeritus Professor of Communication at the Annenberg School for Communication of the University of Pennsylvania. Additional posts include the University of Chicago and the University of Southern California’s Annenberg School for Communication. He helped to found Hebrew University’s Department of Communication and Journalism, paving the way for media studies in other universities and colleges in Israel.

== Television career ==
He is credited with bringing television to Israel, and was director of Israeli Television from 1967 to 1967, now known as KAN 11.

== Awards and recognition ==
In 1989, he was awarded the prestigious Israel Prize, for social sciences.

In 2005, he received the Marshall Sklare Award, given annually by the Association for the Social Scientific Study of Jewry to a senior scholar who has made a significant scholarly contribution to the social scientific study of Jewry.

He received additional honors including the UNESCO-Canada McLuhan Prize and the Burda Prize.

In 2013, he received an honorary degree from Northwestern University. In 2018, he received an honorary doctorate from the University of Pennsylvania. He received additional honorary degrees from the Universities of Ghent, Montreal, Paris, Haifa, Rome (La Sapienza), Bucharest, and Quebec.

He was elected a fellow of the American Academy of Arts and Sciences in 1999.

== See also ==
- List of Israel Prize recipients
