= Mediacracy =

Mediacracy is a system in government where the mass media effectively has control over the voting public. It is closely related to a theory on the role of media in the United States political system, which argues that media and news outlets strongly influence citizens' evaluations of candidates and political issues, thereby possessing effective control over politics in the United States.

== Background ==
The term "mediacracy" was first coined in 1974 by writer and political commentator Kevin Phillips, who used the term in the title of his book Mediacracy: American Parties and Politics in the Communications Age. Since then, the concept has gained popularity and is used by political scientists and researchers alike to discuss the impact of media on both voting behavior and cultural trends. Most recently, the term has seen a resurgence due to the works of economist and author Fabian Tassano. In his book Mediocracy: Inversions and Deceptions in an Egalitarian Culture Tassano argues that the 'dumbing down' of popular media when coupled with increasing obscurity in scholarly discourse leads to a society which has the appearance of egalitarianism, but ultimately is a society ruled by elites. As a reflection of this, the term mediacracy is usually accompanied by negative assumptions about the true nature of media in the United States, along with the aims and desires of mass media as a whole.

== Potential causes ==
There are three main potential causes for the rise in the media's influence on elections, being a combination of different theories on the cultural influence of mass media and recent populist democratic reforms in the American political system. Supporters of the mediacracy theory argue that when taken together, these causes greatly show that the media have a large level of influence over politics in the United States, drawing a link between media's leverage on public opinion, and the increased power that public opinion has on who is elected to office. These potential causes include, but are not limited to:

=== Agenda setting ===
Agenda-setting refers to the ability of the media to affect the salience of issues on the public agenda. In short, the amount of attention paid to a certain issue will lead to audiences viewing that issue as more important. The theory of agenda-setting was formally developed by Dr. Max McCombs and Dr. Donald Shaw in their study on the 1968 presidential election conducted at Chapel Hill, North Carolina. McCombs and Shaw polled 100 residents of the Chapel Hill community and found a strong correlation between what those residents believed to be the most important election issue, and what local and national media outlets reported as the most important election issue. This was a landmark study that displayed a link between an issue's salience in media content and the corresponding salience of that issue in voter's minds.

As of 2005, over 400 studies have discussed the presence of agenda-setting, and the issue remains relevant to the study of the American political system.

=== Priming ===
Priming, in a political context is a theory stating that the media draws attention to some issues as opposed to others, thereby altering the standards by which we judge candidates in elections. Priming is often used in concert with agenda setting in the media, and the two concepts taken together contribute to a full understanding of the level of influence that the mass media holds over the voting public. This theory on media originated from researchers Iyengar, Peters, and Kinder in their work Experimental Demonstrations of the "Not-So-Minimal" Consequences of Television News Programs published in the 1982 edition of The American Political Science Review. Iyengar, Peters, and Kinder argue that due to media making certain issues more salient than others, they set the parameters of the political decisions made by the voting public.

While priming is often unintentional, Iyengar, Peters, and Kinder's 1982 study examines how intentional priming can shape the public's evaluations of candidates and elected officials. The researchers looked at how the salience of certain topics affected voters' evaluations of President Jimmy Carter, and found evidence to support the presence of both agenda setting and priming. Iyengar et al. first proved the effects of agenda setting by finding a correlation between the attention paid to certain political topics and those topics' importance with the voting public when evaluating the President. The researchers then found evidence of priming by finding a link between those established standards, and voters' resulting evaluations of President Carter.

Supporters of the mediacracy theory largely point to this joint phenomenon as evidence that the mass media holds a large amount of control over the voting population.

=== Populist reforms in American democracy ===
Over the course of the last half century, there have been a number of reforms that have led to a shift in control over candidate selection from party elites to the voting public. Thomas Patterson examines this shift, and its resulting correlation with rising political influence of the mass media, in his book Out of Order. From 1960 to 1980, the number of bound or committed delegates in both parties more than doubled, going from 20% on the Democratic side and 35% on the Republican side to 71% and 69% for each respectively in 1980. Also, from 1960 to 2004, the number of states holding primary contests (which favor party elites) instead of caucuses (which favor populism) has more than doubled. Patterson argues that this shift has indirectly strengthened the power of media outlets that have been shown to have much influence over citizens' evaluations of candidates, and as such the media holds much sway in the American political system, despite relatively low levels of political accountability.

== Potential effects ==
Most researchers who discuss the theory of mediacracy agree that media control of the American political system would lead to a decline in objective, rational information sharing in politics at best, and a society that is controlled by the owners of large media conglomerates at worst. However, it is important to remember that the theory of mediacracy as it is popularly discussed is accompanied by very negative assumptions about the true nature of media in the United States, which affects the predilections that researchers make about the future.

Paul Kurtz argues that current media trends emphasizing sensationalization tend to appeal to the lowest common denominator, which would contribute to a decline in the level of education and reflective cognitive thought of media consumers. Kurtz also argues that growing media consolidation harms diversity of opinion in society, and that the focus of media conglomerates on maximizing profits will lead to advertiser control over information obtained through media outlets. This sentiment is greatly echoed by Fabian Tassano, who goes on to speculate that eventually a privileged elite of informed citizens will have control over society.

== Controversies ==
The primary complaint against the theory of mediacracy is that researchers who support the theory are vastly overstating the effects of media influence. Sharon Meraz argues in her study The fight for 'how to think': Traditional media, social networks, and issue interpretation that due to rising fragmentation in information control during the age of the internet, there is "weakening influence of elite, traditional media as a singular power in influencing issue interpretation within networked political environments.". In her study Meraz effectively shows that emerging technologies have reduced the power of media elites, leading to a decline in the hegemonic level of control central to the theories of most supporters of the mediacracy theory. Whether this is a permanent change, or a temporary result of new technology that will be eventually co-opted by media elites, is yet to be determined.

== See also ==
- Mediocracy
- Mediatization
- Politico-media complex
