= Effects of violence in mass media =

Supposed links between fictional and actual violence

The study of violence in mass media analyzes the degree of correlation between themes of violence in media sources (particularly violence in video games, television and films) with real-world aggression and violence over time. Many social scientists support the correlation, however, some scholars argue that media research has methodological problems and that findings are exaggerated. Other scholars have suggested that the correlation exists, but can be unconventional to the current public belief.

Complaints about the possible detrimental effects of mass media appear throughout history; Plato was concerned about the effects of plays on youth. Various media/genres, including dime novels, comic books, jazz, rock and roll, role playing/computer games, television, films, internet (by computer or cell phone) and many others have attracted speculation that consumers of such media may become more aggressive, rebellious or immoral. This has led some scholars to conclude that statements made by some researchers merely fit into a cycle of media-based moral panics. The advent of television prompted research into the effects of this new medium in the 1960s. Much of this research has been guided by social learning theory, developed by Albert Bandura. Social learning theory suggests that one way in which human beings learn is by the process of modeling. Another popular theory is George Gerbner's cultivation theory, which suggests that viewers cultivate a lot of violence seen on television and apply it to the real world. Other theories include social cognitive theory, the catalyst model, and moral panic theory.

== Media effects theories ==
=== Social learning theory ===
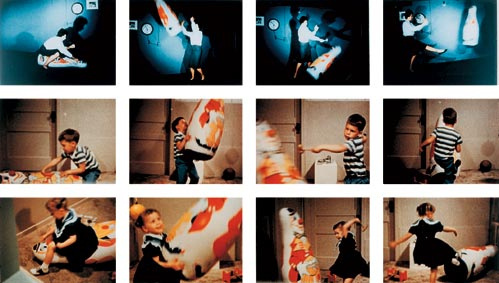
Bandura's Bobo Doll experiments

Social learning theory was proposed by Albert Bandura and suggests that people learn by observing the outcome of others' actions, and that meritable actions were more likely to be imitated than punishable ones. The behavior was observed in Bandura's Bobo Doll experiments. Bandura presented children with an Aggressive Model: The model played with 'harmless' tinker toys for a minute or so but then progressed onto the Bobo doll, in which the model laid the doll down and was violent toward it (punched its nose, hit it with a mallet, tossed it in the air, and kicked it). In addition, verbal comments were made in relation to the scenario. They then put the children in a room with a Bobo doll to see if he/she would imitate the behavior previously seen on the video. Albert Bandura's Bobo Doll experiments demonstrated that children learn behaviors, including aggression, through observation and imitation. With the imitating the aggressive actions they observed, children often displayed novel forms of aggression which highlights the powerful influence of modeled behavior. The study also revealed that children were more likely to imitate aggression if the model was rewarded, but far less likely if the model was punished, emphasizing the role of consequences in shaping observational learning.

The findings of this experiment suggest that children tended to model the behavior they witnessed in the video. This has been often taken to imply that children may imitate aggressive behaviors witnessed in media. However, Bandura's experiments have been criticized on several grounds. First, it is difficult to generalize the aggression toward a bo-bo doll (which is intended to be hit) to person-on-person violence. Secondly, it may be possible that the children were motivated simply to please the experimenter rather than to be aggressive. In other words, the children may have viewed the videos as instructions, rather than incentives to feel more aggressive. Third, in a later study Bandura included a condition in which the adult model was punished for hitting the bo-bo doll by himself being physically punished. Specifically the adult was pushed down in the video by the experimenter and hit with a newspaper while being berated. This actual person-on-person violence actually decreased aggressive acts in the children, probably due to vicarious reinforcement. Nonetheless these last results indicate that even young children don't automatically imitate aggression, but rather consider the context of aggression. Children with aggression have difficulty communicating compassionately.

==== Teen gamers ====
Over time, "teen gamers" can become unaware of their surroundings and lack social interaction in real life. A 2019 article by Hygen Beate mentions that video game violence can impact an individual's essential social skills such as regulating emotions, maintaining good behavior towards others, listening and understanding, responding and communicating, knowing verbal and non-verbal cues, sharing their thoughts, and cooperating with others. According to the survey in medical journal JAMA Network Open written by Chang published May 31, 2019, kids who repeatedly played violent video games learned to think viciously that could eventually influence their behavior and cause them to become aggressive in nature.

Given that some scholars estimate that children's viewing of violence in media is quite common, concerns about media often follow social learning theoretical approaches.

=== Social cognitive theory ===
Social cognitive theories build upon social learning theory, but suggest that aggression may be activated by learning and priming aggressive scripts. Desensitization and arousal/excitation are also included in latter social cognitive theories. The concept of desensitization has particularly gotten much interest from the scholarly community and general public. It is theorized that with repeated exposure to media violence, a psychological saturation or emotional adjustment takes place such that initial levels of anxiety and disgust diminish or weaken. For example, in a study conducted in 2016, a sample of college students were assigned at random to play either a violent or non-violent video game for 20 minutes. They were then asked to watch a 10-minute video of real life violence. According to the American Psychological Association's report titled technical report on the review of the violent video game literature written by Caldwell in February 2020, the revision to the 2015 resolution, playing video games, is often popularly associated with adolescence. "Children younger than age eight who play video games spend a daily average of 69 minutes on handheld console games, 57 minutes on computer games, and 45 minutes on mobile games, including tablets." The students who had played the violent video games were observed to be significantly less affected by a simulated aggressive act than those who did not play the violent video games. However, the degree to which the simulation was "believable" to the participants, or to which the participants may have responded to "demand characteristics" is unclear (see § Criticism below). Nonetheless, social cognitive theory was arguably the most dominant paradigm of media violence effects for many years, although it has come under recent criticism. Recent scholarship has suggested that social cognitive theories of aggression are outdated and should be retired. Some scholars also argue that the continuous viewing of violent acts makes teenagers more susceptible to becoming violent themselves. Children of young age are good observers; they learn by mimicking and adapting the behavior. Playing violent video games created a fear in everyone's heart of violence in real life, which was only valid for adolescents with underlying psychological problems. According to the journal article written by McGloin in 2015, media violence can trigger aggressive behavioral change in the highly characterized aggressive individual. An individual can face severe consequences with media violence, which can increase "bullying behavior."

=== Cultivation theory ===
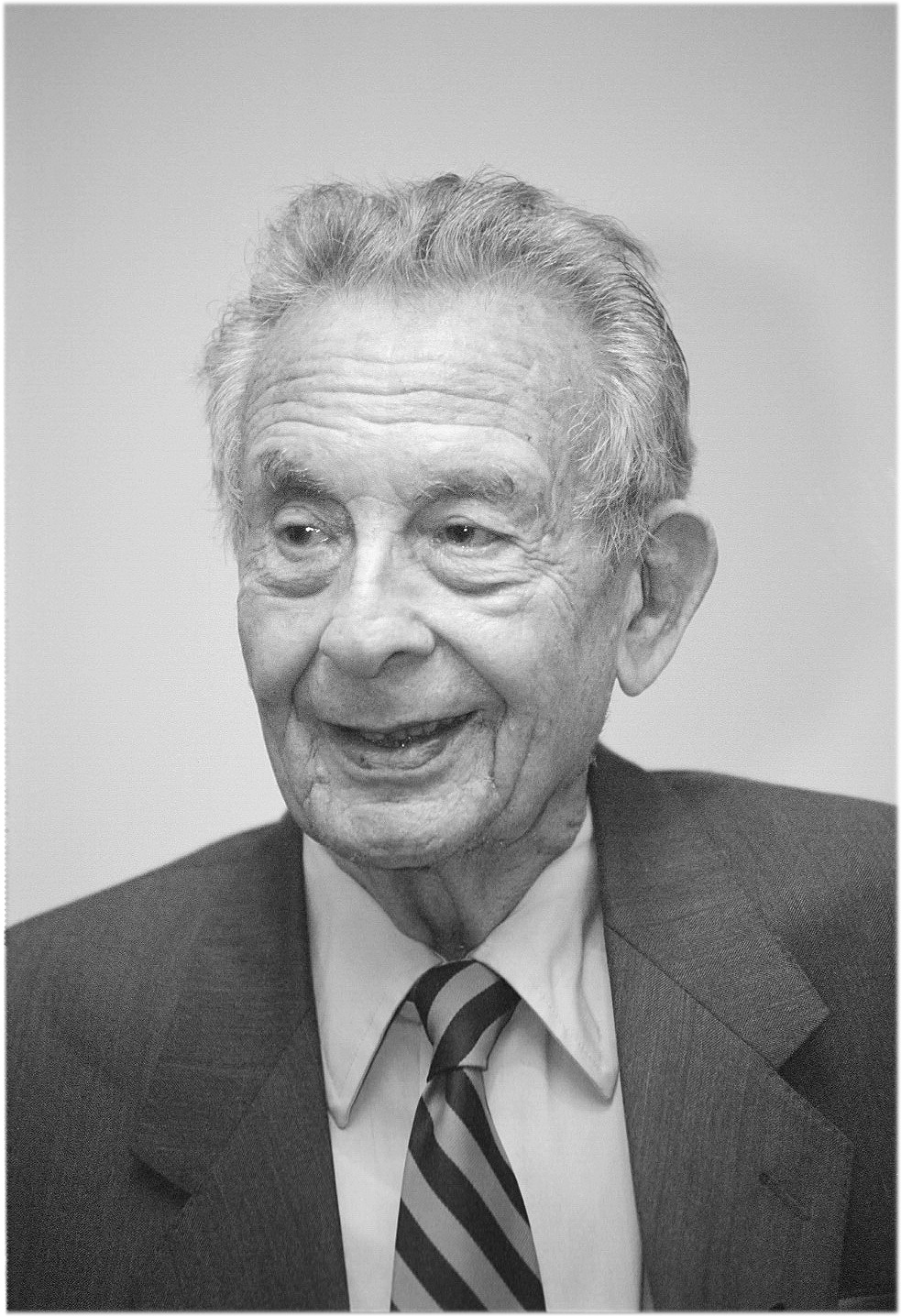
Photo of George Gerbner, founder of cultivation theory

This theory was created by George Gerbner as an alternative way to look at the correlation of violence as seen on television and the individual. Gerbner describes the violence seen on television that most of the population was viewing as "happy violence". He called it such because he noticed that most of the violence seen on television was always followed by a happy ending. Gerbner gave this importance as he believed that the world does not contain 'happy violence' as sometimes there is violence for no reason. However, because the violence seen on television is so captivating for viewers. Gerbner believes that the population will think that violence, whether fictional in movies and shows or non-fictional from the news, will directly effect them. Gerbner named this theory the "magic bullet theory". This theory described the violence seen on television as a "magic bullet" that reaches beyond the screen right into every individual viewer. After this occurs, cultivation theory begins when the individual begins to develop a perception of real world violence around them. Over time, consumers of media will cultivate the violence seen on television and will consider this to be how the real world actually is. This leads to assumptions of local and national crime rates increasing when they are actually decreasing. Additionally, this will lead to negative assumptions about certain groups as they are mainly shown to be violent on television. The main example being illegal immigrants coming from Mexico into the United States. Frequent news watcher will view cases of violent crimes conducted by illegal immigrants. This leads them to believe that all illegal immigrants act this way, thus leading to their disapproval of them. Gerbner calls this the "Mean World Syndrome" which is the product of all the previous theories, stating that a viewer will eventually believe that they live in a world full of deviance and aberrancy.

=== Catalyst model ===
One alternative theory is the catalyst model which has been proposed to explain the etiology of violence. The catalyst model is a new theory and has not been tested extensively. According to the catalyst model, violence arises from a combination of genetic and early social influences (family and peers in particular). According to this model, media violence is explicitly considered a weak causal influence. Specific violent acts are catalyzed by stressful environment circumstances, with less stress required to catalyze violence in individuals with greater violence predisposition. Some early work has supported this view Research from 2013 with inmates has, likewise, provided support for the catalyst model. Specifically, as suggested by the catalyst model, perpetrators of crimes sometimes included stylistic elements or behaviors in their crimes they had seen in media, but the motivation to commit crimes itself was unrelated to media viewing and instead internal.

=== Moral panic theory ===
A final theory relevant to this area is the moral panic. Elucidated largely by David Gauntlett, this theory postulates that concerns about new media are historical and cyclical. In this view, a society forms a predetermined negative belief about a new medium—typically not used by the elder and more powerful members of the society. Research studies and positions taken by scholars and politicians tend to confirm the pre-existing belief, rather than dispassionately observe and evaluate the issue. Eventually the panic dies out after several years or decades, but ultimately resurfaces when yet another new medium is introduced.

=== General aggression model ===
The general aggression model (GAM) proposed by Craig A. Anderson and Brad Bushman is a meta-theory that examines the role of situational and personal variables on behaviors that are aggressive varying from biological to cultural. Variables stem from one's internal states (feelings, thoughts, arousal) and the appraisal/decisions one makes (both automatic and controlled). The GAM was not originally not made to be used as a model to account for media violence, but as a general model for aggressive behavior. By focusing on the general media violence effects, both short and long-term effects, and the recent developments in media violence exposure and its pathways to short and long-term effects, one can use the GAM to account for media violence effects.

Since the GAM is a bio-social-cognitive model, it can explain how both media violence and social environment shape behavior. A study researched how brain structure can add to the GAM and processing. Fast-paced technology, such as video games and television, change brain structure in parts of the brain that are associated with executive control and impulse control. Moreover, social environment is an important piece of the GAM. Because a media diet is part of a social environment, media violence can effect processing.

=== Two-step flow theory ===
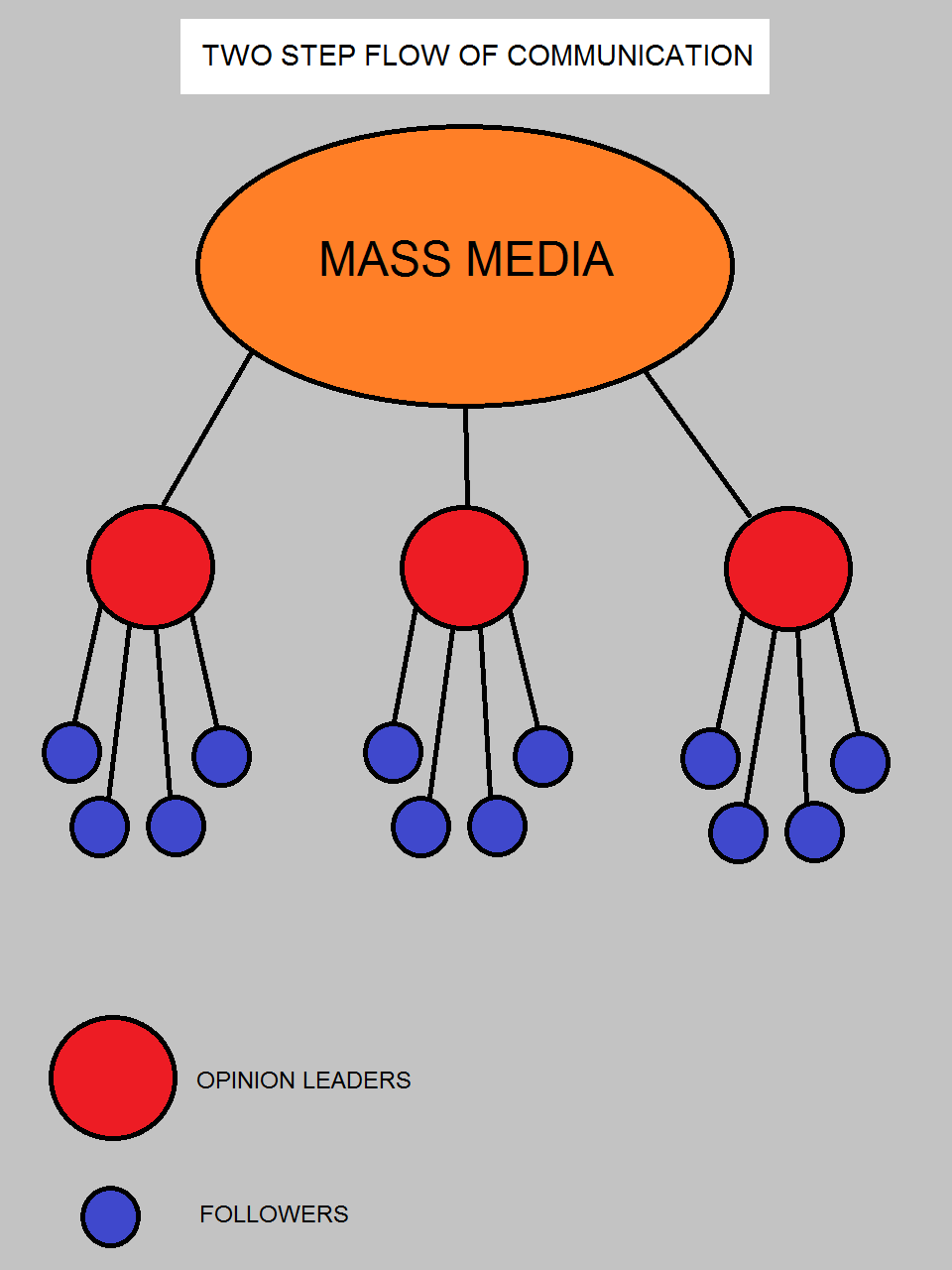
An image showing how opinion leader give information to opinion followers

Paul Lazarsfeld created this theory in 1944. Two-step flow theory opposes the notion that the effect of mass media is a direct one. Instead, it suggests that the information and ideas coming from the mass media go to people named the opinion leaders. Opinion leaders gather the information they hear, make sense of it, and develop a narrative that they would like to push. The opinion leaders would then share their views and ideas with the general public, who then take on the role of Opinion followers. Mass media can give information to many different opinion leaders that will disseminate information in their own unique way, and will then gain a following of opinion followers that will believe their specific outlook on the information. This can lead to many different groups that believe similar or vastly different things that all began at the same source. A popular example of this is news outlets that have political biases. A conservative news source will disseminate information that is typically more accepted and followed by a conservative viewership, and the same goes for more liberal news outlets that have a much more liberal following.

=== Plato ===
Plato was a Greek philosopher who contributed many early thoughts on the effects that media had on individuals. In one of his works, he mentions the dangers of inappropriate poetry perverting its audience. He insisted that their perceptions of poetry would later translate to their perceptions of life, fitting in with George Gerbner's theory of cultivation, which derives from the idea that it is assumed that what is seen in media will apply to the real world.

== Criticism ==
Although organizations such as the American Academy of Pediatrics and the American Psychological Association have suggested that thousands of studies (3,500 according to the AAP) have been conducted confirming this link, others have argued that this information is incorrect. Rather, only about two hundred studies have been conducted in peer-reviewed scientific journals on the effects of violence depicted in television shows, films, songs and video games. Critics argue that about half find some link between media and subsequent aggression (but not violent crime), whereas the other half do not find a link between consuming violent media and subsequent aggression of any kind.

Critics of media violence link focus on a number of methodological and theoretical problems including (but not limited to) the following:

1. Failure to adequately control experimental conditions when assessing aggressive outcomes between violent and non-violent games. Traditionally, researchers have selected one violent game and one non-violent game, yet shown little consideration of the potentially different responses to these games as a result of differences in other game characteristics (e.g., level of action, frustration, enjoyment).
2. Failure to acknowledge the role of social contexts in which media violence is experienced. Within theoretical models explaining the influence of violent video game exposure on aggressive attitudes and behaviour, no acknowledgement is made towards understanding the influence of social gaming experiences and contexts on these outcomes. That is, differential outcomes of gaming arise as a result of different social contexts (online versus offline gaming) and social dynamics involved in social gaming experiences. Existing theoretical models assume that the outcomes of gaming are equivalent, regardless of these different contexts. This is a key limitation of current theory within media violence research
3. Failure to employ standardized, reliable and valid measures of aggression and media violence exposure. Although measurement of psychological variables is always tricky at best, it is generally accepted that measurement techniques should be standardized, reliable and valid, as demonstrated empirically. However, some scholars argue that the measurement tools involved are often unstandardized, sloppily employed and fail to report reliability coefficients. Examples include the "Competitive Reaction Time Test" in which participants believe that they are punishing an opponent for losing in a reaction time test by subjecting the opponent to noise blasts or electric shocks. There is no standardized way of employing this task, raising the possibility that authors may manipulate the results to support their conclusions. This task may produce dozens of different possible ways to measure "aggression", all from a single participant's data. Without a standardized way of employing and measuring aggression using this task, there is no way of knowing whether the results reported are a valid measure of aggression, or were selected from among the possible alternatives simply because they produced positive findings where other alternatives did not. Ferguson and Kilburn, in a paper in Journal of Pediatrics, have found that poorly standardized and validated measures of aggression tend to produce higher effects than well validated aggression measures.
4. Failure to report negative findings. Some scholars contend that many of the articles that purport positive findings regarding a link between media violence and subsequent aggression, on a closer read, actually have negative or inconclusive results. One example is the experimental portion of Anderson & Dill which measures aggression four separate ways (using an unstandardized, unreliable and unvalidated measure of aggression, the Competitive Reaction Time Test mentioned above) and finds significance for only one of those measures. Had a statistical adjustment known as a Bonferroni correction been properly employed, that fourth finding also would have been insignificant. This issue of selective reporting differs from the "file drawer" effect in which journals fail to publish articles with negative findings. Rather, this is due to authors finding a "mixed bag" of results and discussing only the supportive findings and ignoring the negative findings within a single manuscript. The problem of non-reporting of non-significant findings (the so-called "file cabinet effect") is a problem throughout all areas of science but may be a particular issue for publicized areas such as media violence.
5. Failure to account for "third" variables. Some scholars contend that media violence studies regularly fail to account for other variables such as genetics, personality and exposure to family violence that may explain both why some people become violent and why those same people may choose to expose themselves to violent media. Several recent studies have found that, when factors such as mental health, family environment and personality are controlled, no predictive relationship between either video games or television violence and youth violence remain.
6. Failure to adequately define "aggression." Experimental measures of aggression have been questioned by critics. The main concern of critics has been the issue of the external validity of experimental measures of aggression. The validity of the concept of aggression itself, however, is rarely questioned. Highly detailed taxonomies of different forms of aggression do exist. Whether researchers agree on the particular terminology used to indicate the particular sub-types of aggression (i.e. relational versus social aggression), concepts of aggression are always operationally defined in peer-reviewed journals. However, many of these operational definitions of aggression are specifically criticized. Many experimental measures of aggression are rather questionable. Other studies fail to differentiate between "aggression" aimed at causing harm to another person, and "aggressive play" in which two individuals (usually children) may pretend to engage in aggressive behavior, but do so consensually for the purpose of mutual enjoyment.
7. Small "effects" sizes. In the research world, the meaning of "statistical significance" can be ambiguous. A measure of effect size can aid in the interpretation of statistical significance. In a meta-analysis of 217 studies by Paik and Comstock, effect sizes for experiments were r = .37 and r = .19 for surveys, which are small to moderate effects. Most of these studies however did not actually measure aggression against another person. Paik and Comstock note that when aggression toward another person, and particularly actual violent crime is considered, the relationship between media violence and these outcomes is near zero. Effects can vary according to their size (for example the effects of eating bananas on your mood could very well be "statistically significant" but would be tiny, almost imperceptible, whereas the effect of a death in the immediate family would also be "statistically significant" but obviously much larger). Media violence studies usually produce very small, transient effects that do not translate into large effects in the real world. Media violence researchers often defend this by stating that many medical studies also produce small effects (although as Block and Crain note, these researchers may have miscalculated the effect sizes from medical research).
8. Media violence rates are not correlated with violent crime rates. One limitation of theories linking media violence to societal violence is that media violence (which appears to have been consistently and unfailingly on the rise since the 1950s) should be correlated with violent crime (which has been cycling up and down throughout human history). By discussing only the data from the 1950s through the 1990s, media violence researchers create the illusion that there is a correlation, when in fact there is not. Large spikes in violent crime in the United States occurred without associated media violence spikes during the 1880s (when records were first kept) and 1930s. The homicide rate in the United States has never been higher than during the 1930s. Similarly, this theory fails to explain why violent crime rates (including among juveniles) dramatically fell in the mid 1990s and have stayed low, during a time when media violence has continued to increase, and saw the addition of violent video games. Lastly media violence researchers can not explain why many countries with media violence rates similar to or greater than the U.S. (such as Norway, Canada, Japan, etc.) have much lower violent crime rates. Huesmann & Eron's own cross-national study (which is often cited in support of media violence effects) failed to find a link between television violence and aggressive behavior in most of the countries included in the analysis (including America, and even in studies on American boys).
9. Media violence on TV is a reflection of the level of violence that occurs in the real world. Many TV programmers argue that their shows just mirror the violence that goes on in the real world. Zev Braun, of CBS, in 1990 argued in a debate on the Violence Bill that, "We live in a violent society. Art imitates modes of life, not the other way around: it would be better for Congress to clean that society than to clean that reflection of society."
10. Culture and Media Violence. The majority of this research derives from American communication and psychological research. Concerns about the 'effect' of media violence is far less prominent in public and academic discourse in Europe and other parts of the developed world. To a large degree, this is because European and Australian scholars, in particular, recognise that the relationship between media and culture is a great deal more complex than is often conceded by psychological and communications research in North America. There is a recognition that culture is critical to our understanding of these complexities, and that there are no clear causal relations between culture, media, politics and human violence. They simply work in complicated ways through and upon one another through social interactions and history.

A small study published in Royal Society Open Science on 13 March 2019 found that "both fans and non-fans of violent music exhibited a general negativity bias for violent imagery over neutral imagery regardless of the music genres."

=== Response to criticism ===
1. Social science uses randomized experiments to control for possible differences between media conditions, although these must be done with care. In a typical study, children or young adults are randomly assigned to different media conditions and then are observed when given an opportunity to be aggressive. Researchers who argue for causal effects have defended their work that is based on well-established methodological and statistical theory and on empirical data.
2. Regarding the inconclusive nature of some findings, media researchers who argue for causal effects often contend that it is the critics who are misinterpreting or selectively reporting studies. It may be that both sides of the debate are highlighting separate findings that are most favorable to their own "cause".
3. Regarding "third" variables, media violence researchers who argue for causal effects acknowledge that other variables may play a role in aggression and that aggression is due to a confluence of variables. These variables are known as "third variables" and if found, would probably be mediator variables (which differ from moderator variables). A mediator variable could 'explain away' media violence effects, whereas a moderator variable cannot. For instance, some scholars contend that trait aggressiveness has been demonstrated to moderate media violence effects, Another issue is the way in which experimental studies deal with potential confounding variables. Researchers use random assignment to attempt to neutralize the effects of what commonly are cited as third variables (i.e. gender, trait aggressiveness, preference for violent media). Because experimental designs employ random assignment to conditions, the effect of such attributive variables on experimental results is assumed to be random (not systematic). However, the same can not be said for correlational studies, and failure to control for such variables in correlational studies limits the interpretation of such studies. Often, something as simple as gender proves capable of "mediating" media violence effects.
4. Regarding aggression, the problem may have less to do with the definition of aggression, but rather how aggression is measured in studies, and how aggression and violent crime are used interchangeably in the public eye.
5. Much of the debate on this issue seems to revolve around ambiguity regarding what is considered a "small" effect. Media violence researchers who argue for causal effects contend that effect sizes noted in media violence effects are similar to those found in some medical research which is considered important by the medical community, although medical research may suffer from some of the same interpretational flaws as social science. This argument has been challenged as based on flawed statistics, however. Block and Crain recently found that social scientists had been miscalculating some medical effect sizes. The interpretation of effect size in both medical and social science remains in its early stages.
6. More recently, media violence researchers who argue for causal effects have acknowledged that societal media consumption and violent crime rates are not well associated, but claim that this is likely due to other variables that are poorly understood. However, this effect remains poorly explained by current media violence theories, and media violence researchers may need to be more careful not to retreat to an unfalsifiable theory – one that cannot be disproven.
7. Researchers who argue for causal effects argue that the discrepancy of violent acts seen on TV compared to that in the real world are huge. One study looked at the frequency of crimes occurring in the real world compared with the frequency of crimes occurring in the following reality-based TV programs: America's Most Wanted, Cops, Top Cops, FBI, The Untold Story and American Detective. The types of crimes were divided into two categories, violent crimes and non-violent crimes. 87% of crimes occurring in the real world are non-violent crimes, whereas only 13% of crimes occurring on TV are considered non-violent crimes. However, this discrepancy between media and real-life crimes may arguably dispute rather than support media effects theories. Some previous research linked boxing matches to homicides although other researchers consider such linkages to be reminiscent of ecological fallacies. Much more research is required to actually establish any causal effects.

== Desensitization of media violence ==
The term desensitization can be defined as "a general concept that refers to responses to emotionally charged stimuli and describes the process by which a stimulus that initially elicits a strong physiological or emotional reaction becomes less and less capable of eliciting the response the more often it is presented". When exposed to media violence initially, the user tends to generate responses dealing with discomfort, fear, sweat glands activating, and an increase in heart rate. Moreover, after repeated and overlong exposure to media violence on a user, which includes movies, television, and video games reduces the psychological effect of media violence. The user eventually will become emotionally and cognitively desensitized to media over prolonged and repeated media exposure.

Desensitization could also affect the way an individual views violence. Something that repulses a viewer at first could later become normal due to repeated exposure to violent content. For example, if a child plays a lot of violent shooter games, they may start to become numb to the consequences of actual gun violence and how dangerous of a threat it can be to others. Because it is "just a game" to them, they can commit actions virtually that they won't be reprimanded for and this can cause them to believe that such behavior is socially acceptable under certain circumstances. If violence is shown as a "solution" to a problem in most forms of media, meaning that violence is committed to achieve a goal, this can cause consumers of such media to make that connection a reality. When faced with an altercation, one may consider violence rather than de-escalation because of what they have seen on TV, Internet, in music, and in video games. This violent response suddenly becomes much more appealing to the individual and they start to consider things they would not have before. For example, in modern hip-hop music, there are a lot of popular songs that glorify murder and openly talk about killing others as a means of squashing beef or asserting dominance in the community. Whether or not these songs are true, many people listen to these lyrics and their mind becomes filled with violent imagery regardless of if they already had a predisposition to violence or not. This constant exposure to glorified violence keeps the listener in a state of arousal and heightened aggressiveness, which in turn causes changes in behavior. A level-headed person could suddenly start to think murder is an appropriate solution to earn respect amongst peers because of what they are hearing in songs. Because of this, you have many kids trying to act like their favorite rappers and seek out altercations to look "hard" in front of others. An article published in 2006 by the National Institute of Health investigated whether music genre affects a listener's tendencies for substance use and aggressive behavior. The study was conducted on college students under the age of 25 and results showed that 69% of the population reported listening to rap music, and that it positively predicted frequency of marijuana use and aggressive behaviors. Other genres were reported to negatively predict such behaviors.

A study done in 2011, examined the desensitization of violent media content among a sample of a variety of students both men and women. Their findings suggest that the user's physiological activity when shown violent media is less when the user regularly uses violent media content. In the sample, both the men and women had a serious link with both regular violent media use and an increased response of arousal to violence. The sample also showed a significant link between increased media violence use and readily available cognitions of aggression.

== Relationship between media violence and minor aggressive behaviors ==
Given that little evidence links media violence to serious physical aggression, bullying or youth violence, at present most of the debate appears to focus on whether media violence may influence more minor forms of aggressiveness. An article done in 1987 reviewing a history of court cases dealing with violent acts of youths showed that the courts were hesitant to hold media at fault for the violent acts. At present, no consensus has been reached on this issue. For example, in 1974 the US Surgeon General testified to congress that "the overwhelming consensus and the unanimous Scientific Advisory Committee's report indicates that televised violence, indeed, does have an adverse effect on certain members of our society."

In a controlled experiment in 2016, one hundred and thirty-six children ages eight to twelve participated, to investigate whether children in grade school playing violent video games are prone to and affect both the children's physiological and cognitive responses to violence. Playing violent video games links to the activation of aggressive thoughts in contrast to users playing a game as exciting, but nonviolent have little to no aggression. When monitoring frustration levels for both games, levels of frustration in the user did not grow when playing nonviolent games as opposed to violent games user's frustration levels grew. Monitoring the cortisol results of children playing violent video games activates the flight-or-fight response and sympathetic nervous system which results in the releasing of stress hormones leading to aggressive behaviors. Because these video games increase arousal as well as aggressive thoughts, this may cause an individual to display aggressive behavior as their senses are heightened and they have aggression primed as a response.

However, by 2001, the US Surgeon General's office, The Department of Health and Human Services had largely reversed itself, relegating media violence to only a minor role and noting many serious limitations in the research. Studies have also disagreed regarding whether media violence contributes to desensitization.

=== Media violence and youth violence ===
On average, children ages 8-12 in the United States spend 4-6 hours a day watching or using screens, while teens spend up to 9 hours a day on average. This can be a point of concern for some, considering the availability of a vast selection of violent games to consumers. Today's popular games include Call of Duty, Fortnite, GTA, Rainbow Six Siege, and Red Dead Redemption. While these games may differ in the degree of violence propagated to players, violence is still the key element on which these games are built. It is hard to blame aggressive behavior on a single cause, but with that much exposure to violent media, researchers have examined if such pastimes can be negatively influencing mental health.

A 2007 article published by the National Institutes of Health states that three ways in which media violence is believed to affect individuals short-term is through priming, arousal, and mimicking, all aspects of social cognitive theory. Priming is the process in which an observed stimulus can provoke a certain emotion or behavior in an individual due to the mental connection they have formed with the stimulus. For example, a ski mask can cause an individual to be on edge because, though not inherently bad, ski masks have been portrayed as objects of violent crime through their use by armed robbers. In the same way, certain groups of people can be stereotyped through associative priming. For example, if the media commonly portrays black people as more dangerous and prone to violence than other races, an individual may form that connection in their brain and become overly cautious when around black people. Arousal is another reason why media violence can increase aggression in individuals. Arousal in psychology a state of excitement or energy expenditure linked to an emotion. For example, if an individual is aroused by a piece of media and some external factor provokes anger in them, excitation transfer may cause their response to be overly aggressive and different from how they would normally respond if not in a state of excitement. In terms of media violence, some researchers believe that constant exposure to violent content can cause consumers to always be in a heightened state of emotion, or "on edge", therefore making them behave in an overly aggressive manner. Mimicry is the simplest of these three concepts. It simply states that individuals mimic what they see. This is more common in children than in adults. For example, say a child is watching a movie. In that movie, a scene plays out in which a character is made fun of by another character for how they look. The character responds to the insult by punching the other in the face. The child may see this behavior and deem it an appropriate response to such provocation so that, when faced with the same scenario, they lash out in anger. A 2015 report from the American Psychological Association measured the effects of violent video games on aggression for both males and females. Results show that there is a correlation value of 0.2 in experimental, cross-sectional, and longitudinal studies. As children advance into teen years, evidence for violent acts in relation to violent media becomes less consistent. Although most scholars caution that this decline cannot be attributed to a causal effect, they conclude that this observation argues against causal harmful effects for media violence. A recent long-term outcome study of youth found no long-term relationship between consuming violent media and youth violence or bullying.

A recent report from 2023 explores how the increase of saturated media can affect violent actions in children, even years after the media is consumed. For the study, children reported their consumption of music, video games, television, websites with real people, and cartoons with real people. After reviewing the children's media diet and behavior, the study found that exposure to violent media can influence their behavior. Consuming a diverse media diet increases the likelihood that a child engages in seriously violent behavior, five to ten years after consumption. The amount of media that is available to children creates space for children to consume more media that pictures violence as an outlet for anger. However, one factor cannot be accredited for the manner in which a child behaves.

=== Media violence and cultural studies ===
Much of the research on media and violence derives from the United States, particularly the related research fields of psychology and media/communication studies. Research in Europe and Australia on the relationship between media and violence is far broader and is much more clearly embedded in politics, culture and social relationships.

A study done in 2016, examined the relationship between media violence and aggression across different cultures. This was the first cross-cultural study that looked at both the effects of media violence and culture generality regarding aggression across all cultures. Samples obtained from seven different countries (Australia, China, Croatia, Germany, Japan, Romania, and the United States) completed a questionnaire about media habits. Four major findings were derived from the study, the first being that violent media was significantly related to aggressive behaviors. Secondly, the effects of media violence were similar in weight across the countries. The third finding, explains the relationship between aggressive behavior and media violence exposure is determined by the pre-existing aggressive cognitions in oneself and is relevant across different cultures. Lastly, the fourth finding is that media violence is equal to or similar enough to other risk factors that influence aggression meaning special treatment or attention is required/deserved.

Jeff Lewis' book Media Culture and Human Violence challenges the conventional approaches to media violence research. Lewis argues that violence is largely generated through the interaction of social processes and modes of thinking which are constantly refreshed through the media, politics and other cultural discourses. Violence is continually presented as 'authorized' or 'legitimate' within government, legal and narrative media texts. Accordingly, Lewis disputes with the proposition that violence is 'natural' or that violence is caused by media of any sort. Rather, media interacts with culturally generated and inherited modes of thinking or 'consciousness' to create the conditions in which violence can occur. These forms of 'violence thinking' are embedded in historically rooted processes of hierarchical social organization. These hierarchical organizational systems shape our knowledge and beliefs, creating a ferment in which violence is normalized and authorized by governments and other powerful institutions. The link between violence and the media is therefore very complex, but exists within the normative framework of modern culture.

== See also ==
- Aestheticization of violence
- Dart Center for Journalism and Trauma
- For the children (politics)
- Graphic violence
- Hostile media effect
- Mass shooting contagion
- Media panic
- Moral panic
- Motion picture rating system
- Vicarious trauma after viewing media
- Video game controversy
