= Tassano =

Tassano is a surname. Notable people with the surname include:

- Cristian Tassano (born 1996), Uruguayan footballer
- Fabian Tassano (born 1963), German-born British economist
- Fortunato Brescia Tassano (died 1951), Peruvian businessman
- Luis Barrios Tassano (1935–1991), Uruguayan lawyer and diplomat
