= Intimization =

In the context of the influence of mass media, intimization is "a revelatory process which involves the publicizing of information and imagery from what we might ordinarily understand as [an individual's] personal life – broadly defined. It is a publicity process (involving the media) that takes place over time and involves flows of personal information and imagery into the [media]". It has mainly been studied as a society-wide process in the context of politics although it can apply to other contexts.

== Definitions ==
The term intimization was first used and defined as a process by Liesbet Van Zoonen in her study of Dutch television news in the 1980s. She defines it as a process whereby "values from the private sphere are transferred to the public sphere". This is seen not only in the greater focus on ‘human interest subjects’ but also in "the way the relation between audience and news reader is constructed... through carefully picked personalities and intimate modes of address".

Hirdman et al. use the term in their study of changes in Swedish journalism from the 1880s. They define intimization as a process which sees increased journalistic attention on the family, sexuality and the private, what they term the ‘intimate sphere’ as opposed to the public sphere. They suggest that "modes of address, relations to sources, visual representations and focus of texts are seen to interact to create a kind of medial pseudo intimacy."

The term privatization has sometimes also been used to signify the same process. Rahat and Sheafer, for example, define privatization as "a media focus on the personal characteristics and personal life of individual candidates." However, the use of this term is problematic as the word, most commonly associated the sale of state-owned assets, means the reverse, privatizing of something that is public not publicizing the private.

Stanyer argues that Intimization as a process relates primarily to media content formation and dissemination in any society and should not be conflated with para-social or tele-mediated intimacy between audiences and those who appear on TV. Horton and Wohl, writing in the 1950s were particularly interested in the relationship between audience members and those they saw on the TV screen. Horton and Wohl were not interested in the information and imagery to which audience members were exposed and made no distinction between the public and private matters but were rather interested in their illusory (para-social) relationship between audience members and those they saw on the TV screen. While not downplaying the importance of the audience, Stanyer observes it is the information and imagery to which an audience is exposed that is important in the intimization process. It is the mass exposure of information and imagery from what we might ordinarily understand as the personal / private life of a public figure as opposed to their public/ professional life. Information and imagery we might expect only to be exchanged between those in a close relationship. In other words, public figures (politicians, celebrities, sports stars etc.) are not just familiar to us (that is recognisable) but potentially more information about their personal life circulates in the media, and the audience are exposed to more information from the private lives of public figures. An important distinction is made in this respect between familiarity and intimacy.

Stanyer suggests that flows of information can come from three specific areas or domains of the personal life. ‘The first domain concerns the ‘inner life’ of [a person]. This includes, for example, his or her health, well being, sexuality, personal finances, deeds, misdeeds, key milestones (such as birthdays), life experiences and achievements, but also choices about the way an individual wants to live his or her life: for example, life-style choices, ways of behaving, choice of religion or questions of taste. The second domain concerns significant others in a person's personal life and his or her relationship with these actors. This includes relationships with partners, other immediate and extended family members, friends and extra-marital lovers. The third domain concerns an individual's life space: this includes his or her home but it also includes happenings in locations outside the home where the individual is not performing a public function and might want privacy, such as on family holidays’

While Stanyer observes that intimization consists of "the publicizing of information and imagery from these three domains," he also notes such information can enter the public sphere with or without expressed or implied consent of those in public life and can either be scandalous in nature (it reveals a transgression of societal norms) or non-scandalous. An example of the former "might be an act of self-disclosure on a talk show or in an autobiography which is then recycled in the media." Example of the latter "might include, paparazzi photographs of politicians backstage or off-duty, taken without the subject's permission" revealing an extra-marital affair

In sum, drawing on these definitions initimization can be seen as a society wide ‘revelatory process’ which involves the publicizing of information and imagery from the different domains of public figures’ personal lives, either with or without expressed or implied consent of the individual involved.

== Intimization and the media coverage of conventional politics ==
The growing visibility of the private lives of public figures has been much commented on but has received little systematic attention. The findings that emerge are somewhat mixed. Errera analyzed coverage of French politicians’ private lives in two magazines Paris Match and VSD over a seven-year period between 1990 and 1997. She found that politicians’ relationships, personal health, their home and family life, personal financial issues and their past life were very much to the fore in the magazines’ coverage especially of leading French politicians, such as, Jacques Chirac and François Mitterrand.

In terms of newspaper articles referring to UK national leaders’ personal lives, Langer found a clear upward trend over time. The coverage of their private lives rose from around 1% of the leader's coverage in 1945 to 8% during Tony Blair's tenure in office (2007). A follow up study (period 2007-2008) showed that the coverage of opposition leader David Cameron was even more focused on his private life than that of Tony Blair, while that of Prime Minister Gordon Brown was less, suggesting the importance of specific leaders for the amount of attention their private life receives.

However, Rahat and Sheafer, who looked at election coverage in two leading Israeli newspapers for 16 campaigns between 1949 and 2003, found no significant trend in media coverage of candidates’ personal life, with the focus on personal life never exceeding 15% of the news items over time.

The only comparative research conducted so far by Stanyer found some interesting cross national differences. Looking at non-scandalous and scandalous media coverage in seven democracies (Australia, France, Germany, Italy, Spain, the UK and the US) the research found that intimization is more prevalent in the UK and US compared to the other countries. Stanyer argues that there is no magic causal silver bullet, such as, new communication technologies, or tabloidization that can explain the difference between countries. Rather, the outcome is the result of a complex interplay of necessary and sufficient factors operating in conjunction. These include: personal factors including the age of the politician, media conditions, such as the size of the tabloid press and presence and absence of privacy protection for public figures, and political factors, such as the nature of the political system.
