= Knowledge gap hypothesis =

Mass community theory

The knowledge gap hypothesis is a mass communication theory created by Philip J. Tichenor, George A. Donohue, and Clarice. N Olien in 1970. The theory is based on how a member of society processes information from mass media differently based on education level and socioeconomic status (SES). Since there is already a pre-existing gap in knowledge between groups in a population, mass media amplifies this gap to another level. The Knowledge Gap Hypothesis overviews and covers theoretical concepts that the hypothesis builds upon, historical background, operationalization and the means by which the hypothesis is measured, narrative review, meta-analytic support that draws data from multiple studies, new communication technologies that have affected the hypothesis, as well as the idea of Digital Divide, and the existing critiques and scholarly debates surrounding the hypothesis.

== Historical background ==
The knowledge gap hypothesis has been implicit throughout the mass communication literature. Research published as early as the 1920s had already begun to examine the influence of individual characteristics on people's media content preferences.

1929 William S. Gray and Ruth Munroe authors of The Reading Interests and Habits of Adults examined the education advantages of adults which influenced their reading habits. The well educated reader grasped the subject matter in newspaper articles more quickly and moved on to other types of reading materials that fit their interests. The less educated reader spent more time with the newspaper article because it took that person longer to comprehend the topic.

1940 Paul Lazarsfeld, head of the Office of Radio Research at Columbia University, set out to examine whether (1) the total amount of time that people listened to the radio and (2) the type of content they listened to correlated with their socioeconomic status. Not only did Lazarsfeld's data indicate people of lower socioeconomic status tended to listen to more radio programming, but also they were simultaneously less likely to listen to "serious" radio content.

1950 The authors: Shirley A. Star, a professor in the University of Chicago's sociology department and Helen MacGill Hughes, a sociologist of the University of Chicago wrote, "Report on an Educational Campaign: The Cincinnati Plan for the United Nations" discovered that while the campaign was successful in reaching better-educated people, those with less education virtually ignored the campaign. Additionally, after realizing that the highly educated people reached by the campaign also tended to be more interested in the topic, Star and Hughes suggested that knowledge, education, and interest may be interdependent.

1965 Philip Tichenor wrote his doctoral dissertation titled Communication and Knowledge of Science in the Adult Population of the US, which served as a source for some of the information used and analyzed in the later article where the term Knowledge Gap Hypothesis was coined

1970 Philip J. Tichenor, George A. Donohue, and Clarice. N Olien (later known as the Minnesota Team), the authors of the original article Mass Media Flow and Differential Growth in Knowledge, which proposes the hypothesis and applies the idea to social and public life and generally relevant information, and less so to “audience-specific topics such as stock market quotations, society news, sports and lawn and garden care” (Tichenor, Donohue, & Olien, 1970, p. 160)

1983 Gaziano put out a review of 58 studies on SES-based knowledge inequities, which emphasizes how variations in media exposure, knowledge definitions, and population differences contribute to inconsistent findings on knowledge gaps.

== Theoretical Concepts ==
Tichenor, Donohue, and Olien suggest five factors why the knowledge gap should exist:

1. Communication skills: "Persons with more formal education would be expected to have higher reading and comprehension abilities necessary to acquire public affairs or science knowledge." (Tichenor, Donohue, and Olien 1970, pp. 162) For example, higher socioeconomic status, SES, people generally have more education, which improves their reading, writing, and comprehension skills.
2. Amount of stored information: "Persons who are already better informed are more likely to be aware of a topic when it appears in mass media and are better prepared to understand it."(Tichenor, Donohue, and Olien 1970, pp. 162) For example, more informed people are more likely to already know of news stories through previous media exposure or through formal education and can relate new information to past exposure.
3. Relevant social contact: "Education generally indicates a broader sphere of everyday activity, a greater number of reference groups and more interpersonal contacts, which increase the likelihood of discussing public affairs topics with others." (Tichenor, Donohue, and Olien 1970, pp. 162) For example, higher socioeconomic status, SES, people generally have a network of friends or colleagues that are more likely to have access to more information on news stories and more skilled to research the topics.
4. Selective exposure, acceptance, and retention of information: "A persistent theme in mass media research is the apparent tendency to interpret and recall information in ways congruent with existing beliefs and values."(Tichenor, Donohue, and Olien 1970, pp. 162) For example, a viewer of a news program will pay attention more to story that interests them.
5. Nature of the mass media system that delivers information. Different media has specific target markets.(Tichenor, Donohue, and Olien 1970, pp. 162) For example, social media platforms like TikTok targets a younger audience whereas daytime television targets an older audience. In the 1970, print media was written for an audience with a higher education level.

== Hypothesis operationalization ==
According to the authors, Jack Rosenberry and Lauren A.Vicker, " A hypothesis is basically a research question: the researcher needs to ask questions and answer them in order to formulate theory. The term "hypothesis" also can be used to describe a theory that is still in the development stage or that has not been fully researched and verified. Because of the somewhat contradictory nature of the research findings, the knowledge gap has not yet achieved theory status and is still known as a hypothesis."

Since the 1970s, many policy makers and social scientists have been concerned with how community members acquire information via mass media. Throughout the years, extensive research has been conducted and taken different approaches to researching the Knowledge Gap Hypothesis. The hypothesis operationalization consists of the following:

- For cross-sectional research, the knowledge gap hypothesis expects that "at any given time, there should be a higher correlation between acquisition of knowledge and education for topics highly publicized in the media than for topics less highly publicized. Tichenor, Donohue, and Olien (1970) tested this hypothesis using an experiment in which participants were asked to read and discuss two news stories of varying publicity. The results of the experiment support the hypothesis because correlations between education and understanding were significant for high publicity stories but not significant for low publicity stories.
- For time-series research, the knowledge gap hypothesis expects that "over time, acquisition of knowledge of a heavily publicized topic will proceed at a faster rate among better educated persons than among those with less education." Tichenor, Donohue, and Olien (1970) tested this hypothesis using public opinion surveys gathered between 1949 and 1965 measuring whether participants believed humans would reach the Moon in the foreseeable future. During the 15-year span, belief among grade-school educated people increased only about 25 percentage points while belief among college educated people increased more than 60 percentage points, a trend consistent with the hypothesis.

== Narrative review and meta-analytic support ==
Since the 1970s, many policy makers and social scientists have been concerned with how community members acquire information via mass media. Throughout the years, extensive research has been conducted and taken different approaches to researching the Knowledge Gap Hypothesis.

Cecilie Gaziano, a researcher of Communication and Media, Quantitative Social Research and Social Stratification wrote Forecast 2000: Widening Knowledge Gaps, to update her 1983 analysis of knowledge gap studies. Gaziano discusses the connection between education and income disparities between the "haves" and "have-nots." Gaziano conducted two narrative reviews, one of 58 articles with relevant data in 1983 and the other of 39 additional studies in 1997.

The interconnection between income, education and occupation are factors of the knowledge gap throughout history. Here is a closer look at the economic gaps caused by major economic events:

- 1929 The Stock Market Crash - causing the major economic turning point.
- 1950 Consumerism: Post WWII, automobile and television sales increased rapidly. Working and middle-class families were buying televisions. All socio economic segments experienced growth.
- 1970 Stagflation: rise of inflation and recession due to oil prices, cost of Vietnam War and international competition of consumer goods caused unequal wealth distribution in the United States.
- 1997 Economic inequality for the have and have nots was greater than 1929

Hwang and Jeong (2009) conducted a meta-analysis of 46 knowledge gap studies. Consistent with Gaziano's results, however, Hwang and Jeong found constant knowledge gaps across time. Gaziano writes, "the most consistent result is the presence of knowledge differentials, regardless of topic, methodological, or theoretical variations, study excellence, or other variables and conditions" (1997, p. 240). Evidence from several decades, Gaziano concludes, underscores the enduring character of knowledge gaps and indicates that they transcend topics and research settings.

Gaziano explains the conceptual framework of the knowledge barriers, the critical conceptual issues are the following measurements:

- SES Socioeconomic status: education, income, and occupation
- Knowledge
- Knowledge gap
- Media publicity

Jeffrey Mondak and Mary Anderson (2004) released a statistical analysis of the knowledge gap hypothesis, finding out that while increased media exposure can enhance political knowledge, pre-existing socioeconomic and gender disparities often determine who benefits the most, reinforcing rather than reducing knowledge inequities.

"All analyses point to a common conclusion: approximately 50% of the gender gap is illusory, reflecting response patterns that work to the collective advantage of male respondents."

== New communication technologies ==
The internet has changed how people engage media. The internet-based media has to be accessed with digital devices and accessed to the internet. In the United States, there is a concern about the digital divide because not all Americans have access to the internet and devices. With the hope that Internet would close the knowledge gap, it has exposed the following inequities: access, motivation and cognitive ability. The following research displays the link between access to internet and socioeconomic status, SES.

According to a Pew Research Center survey of U.S. adults conducted Jan. 25-Feb. 8, 2021, Emily Vogels, a research associate focusing on internet and technology, wrote, "More than 30 years after the debut of the World Wide Web, internet use, broadband adoption and smartphone ownership have grown rapidly for all Americans – including those who are less well-off financially. However, the digital lives of Americans with lower and higher incomes remain markedly different."

"Americans with higher household incomes are also more likely to have multiple devices that enable them to go online. Roughly six-in-ten adults living in households earning $100,000 or more a year (63%) report having home broadband services, a smartphone, a desktop or laptop computer and a tablet, compared with 23% of those living in lower-income households."

Emily Vogels, continues, "The digital divide has been a central topic in tech circles for decades, with researchers, advocates and policymakers examining this issue. However, this topic has gained special attention during the coronavirus outbreak as much of daily life (such as work and school) moved online, leaving families with lower incomes more likely to face obstacles in navigating this increasing digital environment. For example, in April 2020, 59% of parents with lower incomes who had children in schools that were remote due to the pandemic said their children would likely face at least one of three digital obstacles to their schooling, such as a lack of reliable internet at home, no computer at home, or needing to use a smartphone to complete schoolwork."

== Scholarly debates ==
The framework of the hypothesis was widely criticized throughout mass communications studies.

In 1977, Ettema and Kline moved the lens of focus of the Knowledge gap hypothesis from deficits of knowledge acquisition to differences in acquiring knowledge. Central to their argument was the aspect of motivation that people of different SES would demonstrate to learn new information. Ettema and Kline concluded that the less education and knowledge held by people of lower SES was functional, thus enough for them.

In 1980, Dervin started questioning the traditional source-receiver model of mass communication, as concentrating on receivers’ failure to get and interpret information is “blaming the victim.”

In 2003, Everett Rogers renamed the Knowledge gap hypothesis to the Communication Effects Gap hypothesis, as the existing gap was attributed to miscommunication and had nothing to do with receivers of information.

Further debates surrounded the Knowledge Gap Hypothesis regarding the definition of the hypothesis in the textbook as it seemed unattractive to people of different SESs. The idea of posing open-ended questions was introduced to let responders answer the questions more profoundly. However, Gaziano states that gaps in knowledge were still found, and according to Hwang and Jeong (2009), they resulted in smaller gaps compared to other methods of analyzing the hypothesis.
