= Priming (media) =

Cognitive theory

The priming theory states that media images stimulate related thoughts in the minds of audience members.

Grounded in cognitive psychology, the theory of media priming is derived from the associative network model of human memory, in which an idea or concept is stored as a node in the network and is related to other ideas or concepts by semantic paths. Priming refers to the activation of a node in this network, which may serve as a filter, an interpretive frame, or a premise for further information processing or judgment formation.

== General aggression model ==
The general aggression model (GAM) integrates the priming theory with the social learning theory to describe how previously learned violent behavior may be triggered by thoughts, emotions, or physiological states provoked by media exposure. However, the GAM has come under considerable criticism in recent years regarding underlying and unproven assumptions and poor data support for the theory.

== Political media priming ==
Political media priming is "the process in which the media attend to some issues and not others and thereby alter the standards by which people evaluate election candidates". A number of studies have demonstrated that there is a dimension of powerful media effects that goes beyond agenda setting. In 1982, Iyengar, Peters, and Kinder first identified this added dimension as the “priming effect.” The theory is founded on the assumption that people do not have elaborate knowledge about political matters and do not take into account all of what they do know when making political decisions — they must consider what more readily comes to mind. Through drawing attention to some aspects of politics at the expense of others, the media might help to set the terms by which political judgments are reached, including evaluations of political figures. Priming happens when news media suggest to audiences ways and specific issues that should be used to evaluate the performance of leaders and governments.

Priming is often discussed in tandem with agenda-setting theory. The reason for this association is two-fold. The first, per Hastie & Park, is that both theories revolve around salient information recall, operating on the idea that people will use information that is most readily available when making decisions. The second, per Iyengar and Kinder, is that priming is latter part of a two-fold process with agenda-setting that takes place over time. Once agenda setting has made an issue salient, priming is the process by which "mass media can... shape the considerations that people take into account when making judgements about political candidates or issues". In short, both theories point to ease of accessibility of information in one's mind but priming is something that can occur over a period of time after exposure to a given media segment.

Researchers also analyze the impact of political media priming through news. Early findings indicated that political media served to prime audience members, however researchers argue this is due to the increased availability over political media rather than priming. Rather than analyzing media affecting what people think about, researchers switched their focus to analyzing how political media affects perceived presidential performance.

In addition to the connection to agenda-setting and presidential evaluations, political media priming also shows how different coverage can affect audiences due to their characteristics and media environments. Individuals that strongly take a partisan side or that may have a stronger belief system tend to be more susceptible to primes when the new information is filtered based on their existing attitudes. As media takes new forms, such as online social media platforms, people are more likely to be shown news that aligns with their beliefs because of algorithms, which can strengthen priming effects. As a result, priming does more than just influencing how people judge politics, it can also lead groups to become more polarized by strengthening the divisions when evaluating leaders and political results.

== Research ==
Some types of priming are content priming and process priming. Content priming occurs when information is primed and cognitive processes create mental representations of it, influencing a response. There are many forms of content priming, such as semantic priming, special case priming, evaluative priming, direct priming, indirect priming, etc. Process priming occurs when a prime becomes more available, and thus increases the likelihood of performing the result of the prime.

Priming isn't always unintentional, as Jacobs and Shapiro demonstrate in a quantitative and historical analysis of John F. Kennedy’s 1960 presidential campaign. Their research extends the application of priming theory from its original focus of how individuals form attitudes and make decisions to the study of candidate behavior. This new approach, they say, "changes the analytic focus from unintentional priming to intentional priming, namely, the deliberate strategies that candidates pursue to influence voters". Priming can be an effective campaign strategy for presidential candidates, the authors indicate, by a process of carefully calculated uses of public opinion on policy issues to influence voters’ standards for assessing the candidates’ attributes. In this study, the authors focus on the 1960 election because innovative public opinion surveys were incorporated into Kennedy's campaign strategy that enabled him to use position taking to shape his image. Their research was based on primary evidence drawn from archival records and interviews, as well as a combination of interpretative and quantitative analysis. They found that a relationship exists between Kennedy's positions on policy matters and results from his private public opinion surveys. His campaign combined image building with position taking on issues that responded to perceived public opinion. Though this study does neglect questions concerning how and why real politicians use polling results to prime voters, Jacobs and Shapiro effectively demonstrate that the priming process is powerful enough to be used intentionally by political candidates as a tool to influence public opinion during election campaigns.

In Iyengar, Peters, and Kinder's 1982 study of priming, they set out to determine what effect intentional priming might have on the public's evaluation of president Jimmy Carter. Their hypothesis stated that making certain political topics salient through primetime media, such as defense or spending, would cause viewers to evaluate president Carter based on said topics. The experiment's results demonstrated the phenomena of agenda-setting and priming. First, Iyengar et al. found evidence of agenda-setting in the positive correlation between exposure to a given political topic and its importance when evaluating the president. They then found that said standards affected the actual evaluation of the president's performance, demonstrating priming. This experiment points to the potential of news media to direct the public's attention and perception of political figures, though the researchers also indicate that subjects with higher self-reported levels of knowledge of politics showed decreased effects of priming. This lead Iyengar's team to the conclusion that priming has varied implications depending on an individual's given knowledge prior to political news media exposure.

Research also indicates that campaigns and media coverage of specific issues can make it seem like there is priming through a two-part process: 1) campaigns and media messages inform audiences about the parties and candidates’ positions and 2) once informed, the audience adopts the position of their preferred party or candidate. This concept of making political messaging that is favorable to a certain campaign poses an incentive for campaigns and partisan-leaning media outlets to make salient topics that are favorable to the particular side or idea. In these cases it can be a particularly powerful factor, as it engages both society - how a topic is perceived in the wider culture or media, and the individual - how personally relevant the issue is to an individual.

The concept of "spreading activation" has also been explored by media and social science research. Spreading activation refers to a process "whereby media coverage serves to increase the salience of an issue in a person's mind, resulting in that issue being more likely to serve as a standard by which related issues are evaluated." This theory is predicated on prior "assumptions of attitude accessibility and memory-based models of information processing." The theory purports that "mental knowledge clusters" are how people organize information they process and perceive, and that these clusters vary in their mental accessibility depending on occurrences at a given moment. Thus these priming models relate back to attitude formation based on the salience of characteristics and factors during decision making.

== Replication ==
There is an ongoing debate over the effectiveness of priming. One limitation of psychological priming studies (an area of research different from what is discussed in this entry) is that their findings struggle to be replicated. When researchers attempt to replicate another's work and get inconsistent results, it makes the original findings less credible. The reason why priming studies are difficult to replicate is because there are numerous factors that change their results. These factors are so sensitive that changing the original methodology of the experiment can change the results as well. Some factors that can affect replication are the physical surroundings, individual factors, social factors, etc. Even if priming had the same experimental situations, there is a possibility that people don't respond or react the same way. Another limitation is that the effects of media priming can fade over time.

== See also ==
- Media influence
- Agenda-setting theory
- Framing (social sciences)
- Priming (psychology)
- Overton window
