= Fabian Tassano =

British economist

Fabian Michael Wadel known professionally as Fabian Tassano, is an economist and author, known for his 1995 book, The Power of Life or Death, and for his critique of ideological aspects of modern culture.

== Biography ==
Tassano studied Natural Sciences at Churchill College, Cambridge, specialising in Physics and Philosophy of Science. He graduated with a First in 1984, winning the Bronowski Prize.

In 1991 he qualified as a Chartered Accountant with KPMG Peat Marwick. He came tenth nationally in the Institute of Chartered Accountants' qualifying exam.

From 1992 to 2000 he was a postgraduate student, and subsequently college lecturer in economics, at the University of Oxford. He carried out research on vertical integration policy in the UK and Germany, and on the economic effects of vertical mergers, for which he was awarded a doctorate by Oxford in 1998.

From 1994 to 2000 he held College Lecturerships in Economics at the University of Oxford. From 2000 to 2002 he was a senior economist at PricewaterhouseCoopers in London.

He is currently a Research Director at Oxford Forum, where he collaborates with Celia Green and Charles McCreery.

== Books ==
In 1995 Tassano published The Power of Life or Death with a foreword by Thomas Szasz. The Power of Life or Death brings free-market and libertarian philosophical ideas into the medical ethics debate, in particular in relation to the treatment of the terminally ill, and examines the ideological subtext of the medical ethics literature, which Tassano argues often gives greater weight to collective interests than to the preferences of individual patients. The book was described by the philosopher Antony Flew as 'intellectually first-class'. The book also received numerous reviews from medical professionals, the British Medical Journal commented, "I would not recommend this book as comfortable bedtime reading but if you like an intellectual challenge this one is for you." A review in Nature commented, "His view goes straight to the medical jugular", and in a Literary Review article Cristina Odone wrote, "Tassano presents hair-raising case studies [...] his book is a timely polemic."

In 2006, Tassano published Mediocracy: Inversions and Deceptions in an Egalitarian Culture which analyses the ideological content of modern culture in general. Tassano argues that both ‘dumbing down’ in the popular media, and the obscurantism prevalent in academic discourse, are manifestations of the same underlying ideology: one which appears egalitarian but in reality is designed to privilege a paternalistic elite and exclude those who might criticise it. Patrick Minford said the book "delightfully dissects the language of modern egalitarianism and political correctness." Mediocracy received favourable reviews from a number of online commentators. Johnathan Pearce of the libertarian website Samizdata called it 'a rather fine book'. Curtis Yarvin described it as 'a comprehensive and witty dictionary'.

In 2019 Tassano published a collection of essays entitled The Ideology of the Elites.

In 2025 Tassano, along with his colleague Christine Fulcher, published Power-mad and Hypocritical: Why professors love Marxism. The book argues that humanities professors introduce Marxist ideology into their publications, and teach it to students, under the label 'Critical Theory'.

== Other selected publications ==
- 'Tax aspects of corporate activity', Energy Utilities, February 1996.
- 'Are vertical mergers harmful?’, European Competition Law Review, 7, 1999.
- 'Information Complexity as a Driver of Emergent Phenomena in the Business Community' (with J. Efstathiou et al.), Proceedings of the International Workshop on Emergent Synthesis, Kobe University, 1999.
- Tax for the Terrified, Tassano & Co, 1994.
