= Mass media =

Forms of media that reach large audiences

Admins, do not protect this page

Learn why:

Only admins can see this message.

This article is currently featured on the Main Page as This Week's Article for Improvement. The purpose of TWAFI is to encourage readers to make their first edits and understand how Wikipedia works. Keeping this article completely unprotected is essential to this goal.

Obviously, we need a lot of eyes to watch out for vandalism, but an increase in vandalism is not a reason to protect TWAFI. Instead, monitor this article closely and block specific problematic accounts rather than restricting access for unregistered users or applying pending changes protection. Move protection is okay for the entire week to prevent page move vandalism.

Men reading public newspapers, a form of print media, in the streets of Nanjing, China, 2008

Mass media refers to the forms of media that reach large audiences via mass communication. It includes broadcast media, digital media, print media, social media, streaming media, advertising, and events.

Mass media encompasses news, advocacy, entertainment, and public service announcements, and intersects with the study of marketing, propaganda, public relations, political communication, journalism, art, drama, computing, and technology. The influence of mass media on individuals and groups has also been analysed from the standpoint of anthropology, economics, history, law, philosophy, psychology, and sociology.

Mass media is often controlled by media conglomerates, which may include mass media organisations, companies, and networks, and may be susceptible to media capture.

== Definition ==
In the late 20th century, mass media could be classified into eight mass media industries: books, the internet, magazines, movies, newspapers, radio, recordings, and television. The explosion of digital communication technology in the late 20th and early 21st centuries challenged this classification. By the early 2000s, a classification called the "seven mass media" came into use, comprising:

1. Print (books, pamphlets, newspapers, magazines, posters, etc.) – late 15th century
2. Recordings (gramophone records, magnetic tapes, cassettes, cartridges, CDs, and DVDs) – late 19th century
3. Cinema – c. 1900
4. Radio – c. 1910
5. Television – c. 1950
6. The internet – c. 1990
7. Mobile phones – c. 2000

The sixth and seventh media, internet and mobile phones, are often referred to collectively as digital media, and the fourth and fifth, radio and TV, as broadcast media. Some argue that video games have developed into a distinct mass form of media.

=== Characteristics ===
Five characteristics of mass communication have been identified by sociologist John Thompson of Cambridge University:

1. Both technical and institutional methods are involved in the of production and distribution.
2. Involves the process of symbols gaining commercial value.
3. The context between the production and reception information are separate.
4. Its "reach to those 'far removed' in time and space, in comparison to the producers"
5. "Information distribution" – a "one-to-many" form of communication, whereby products are mass-produced and disseminated to large audiences

=== Mainstream media ===
In common usage, the term "mass" denotes not that a given number of individuals receives the products, but rather that the products are available in principle to a plurality of recipients. The term "mass media" is sometimes used as a synonym for "mainstream media". However, mass media may include alternative media outlets that employ mass communication technology, even if their audience is smaller than mainstream media. In contrast, mainstream media are distinguished from alternative media by their content and point of view.

== History ==
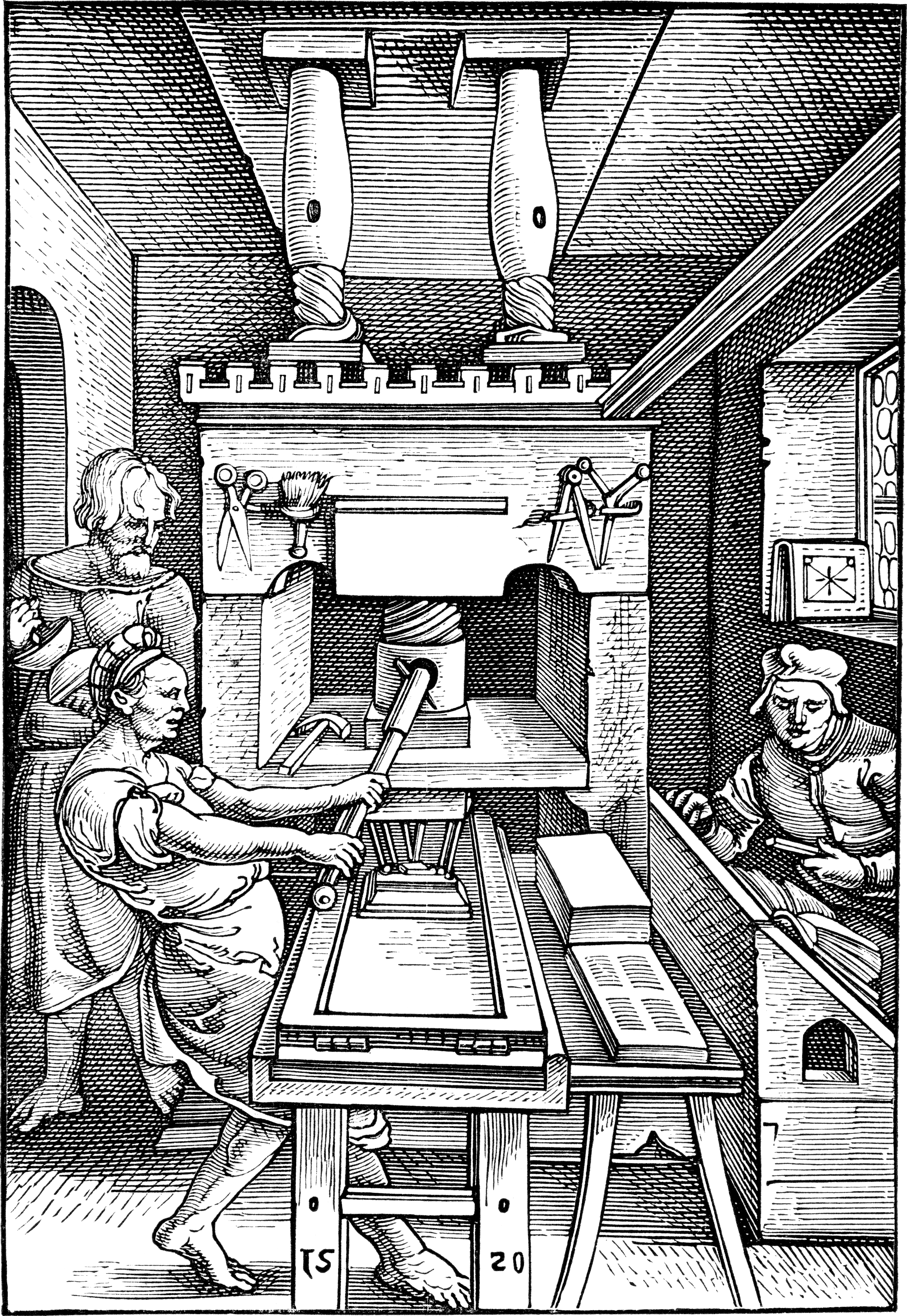
Early wooden printing press, depicted in 1520

The first dated print book known as the Diamond Sutra was printed in China in 868 AD, although it is clear that books were printed earlier. Movable type made of clay was invented in 1041 in China. However, due to the slow spread of literacy in China and the relatively high cost of paper there, the earliest printed mass medium was probably the European popular prints from about 1400. Although these were produced in huge numbers, very few early examples survived, and even most known to be printed before about 1600 have not survived.

There is some disagreement over when the term "mass media" was coined. Some sources say it started in Europe in the Middle Ages. Others say it was coined in the 1920s, related to the invention of radio.

Johannes Gutenberg's invention of the printing press allowed for the mass production of books to spread globally. He printed the Latin Bible on a printing press with movable type in 1453. The invention of the printing press gave rise to some of the first forms of mass communication by enabling the publication of books and newspapers on a scale much larger than was previously possible. The invention also transformed the way the world received printed materials, although books remained too expensive to be called a mass medium for at least a century after that.

Newspapers developed from c. 1612, with the first English example in 1620, although they took until the 19th century to reach a mass audience. The first high-circulation newspapers arose in London in the early 1800s, such as The Times, and were made possible by the invention of the high-speed rotary steam printing press and railroads which allowed large-scale distribution over wide geographical areas. The increase in circulation, however, led to a decline in feedback and interactivity from the readership, making newspapers a one-way medium.

The phrase "the media" began to be used in the 1920s. The notion of "mass media" was generally restricted to print media until after World War II, when radio, television and video were introduced. Radio became an extremely popular source of information and entertainment, and allowed news of events in distant places to travel much faster. However, this was later partially replaced by a new technology: the television. Televisions first became widely used in the USA and England in the late 1940s. Other countries adopted the technology in the 1950s.

During the 20th century, the growth of mass media was driven by technology, including that which allowed large-scale duplication of material. Physical duplication technologies such as printing, record pressing and film duplication allowed the distribution of books, newspapers and movies at low prices to huge audiences. Radio and television allowed the electronic duplication of information for the first time. Mass media had the economics of linear replication: a single work could make money proportional to the number of copies sold, and as volumes went up, unit costs went down, increasing profit margins further. Vast fortunes were made in mass media.

In a democratic society, the media can serve the electorate about issues regarding government and corporate entities. Some consider the concentration of media ownership to be a threat to democracy.

In recent times, the internet has become the latest and most popular mass medium. Information has become readily available through websites, and easily accessible through search engines. Modern-day mass media includes the internet, mobile phones, blogs, podcasts and RSS feeds.

=== Mergers and acquisitions ===
Between 1985 and 2018, about 76,720 deals had been announced in the media industry, with an overall value of around US$5,634 billion. There have been three major waves of mergers and acquisitions (M&A) in the mass media sector (2000, 2007 and 2015), while the most active year in terms of numbers was 2007 with around 3,808 deals. The United States is the most prominent country in media M&A with 41 of the top 50 deals having an acquirer from the United States.

The largest deal in history was the acquisition of Time Warner by AOL Inc. for US$164,746.86 million.

== Forms ==
=== Broadcast media ===
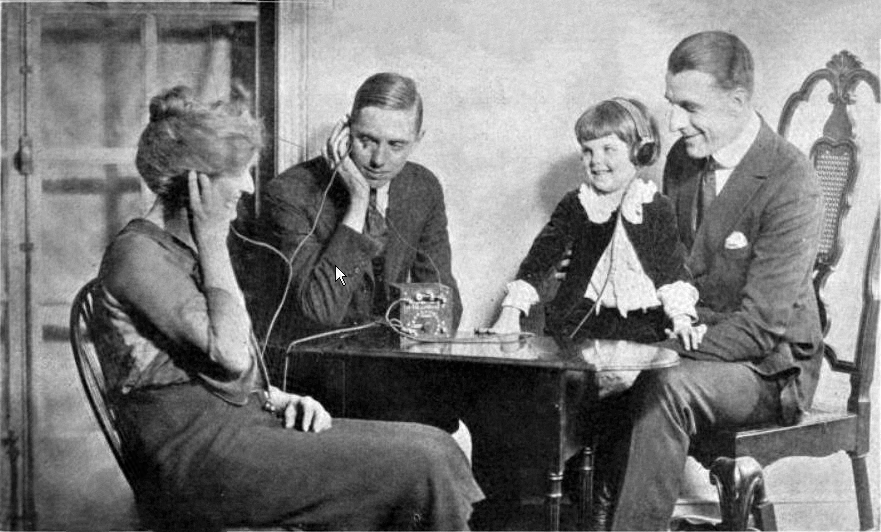
A family listening to a crystal radio in the 1920s

Broadcast media includes radio and radio and television programs. Television includes cable television, which may require a cable converter box, and generally includes subscription-based channels and pay-per-view services. Digital radio and digital television may also transmit multiplexed programming, with several channels compressed into one ensemble. Broadcast regulations, programming, and terminology have emerged as independent fields of inquiry. When broadcasting is done via the internet, the term webcasting is often used. In 2004, a new phenomenon occurred when a number of technologies combined to produce podcasting.

=== Film ===
The term 'film' encompasses motion pictures as individual projects, as well as the field in general. The name comes from the photographic film (also called film stock), historically the primary medium for recording and displaying motion pictures. Many other terms for film exist, such as motion pictures (or just pictures and "picture"), the silver screen, photoplays, the cinema, picture shows, flicks and, most commonly, movies.

Films are produced by recording people and objects with cameras, or by creating them using animation techniques or special effects. Films comprise a series of individual frames, but when these images are shown in rapid succession, an illusion of motion is created. Flickering between frames is not seen because of an effect known as persistence of vision, whereby the eye retains a visual image for a fraction of a second after the source has been removed. Also of relevance is what causes the perception of motion: a psychological effect identified as beta movement.

=== Video games ===
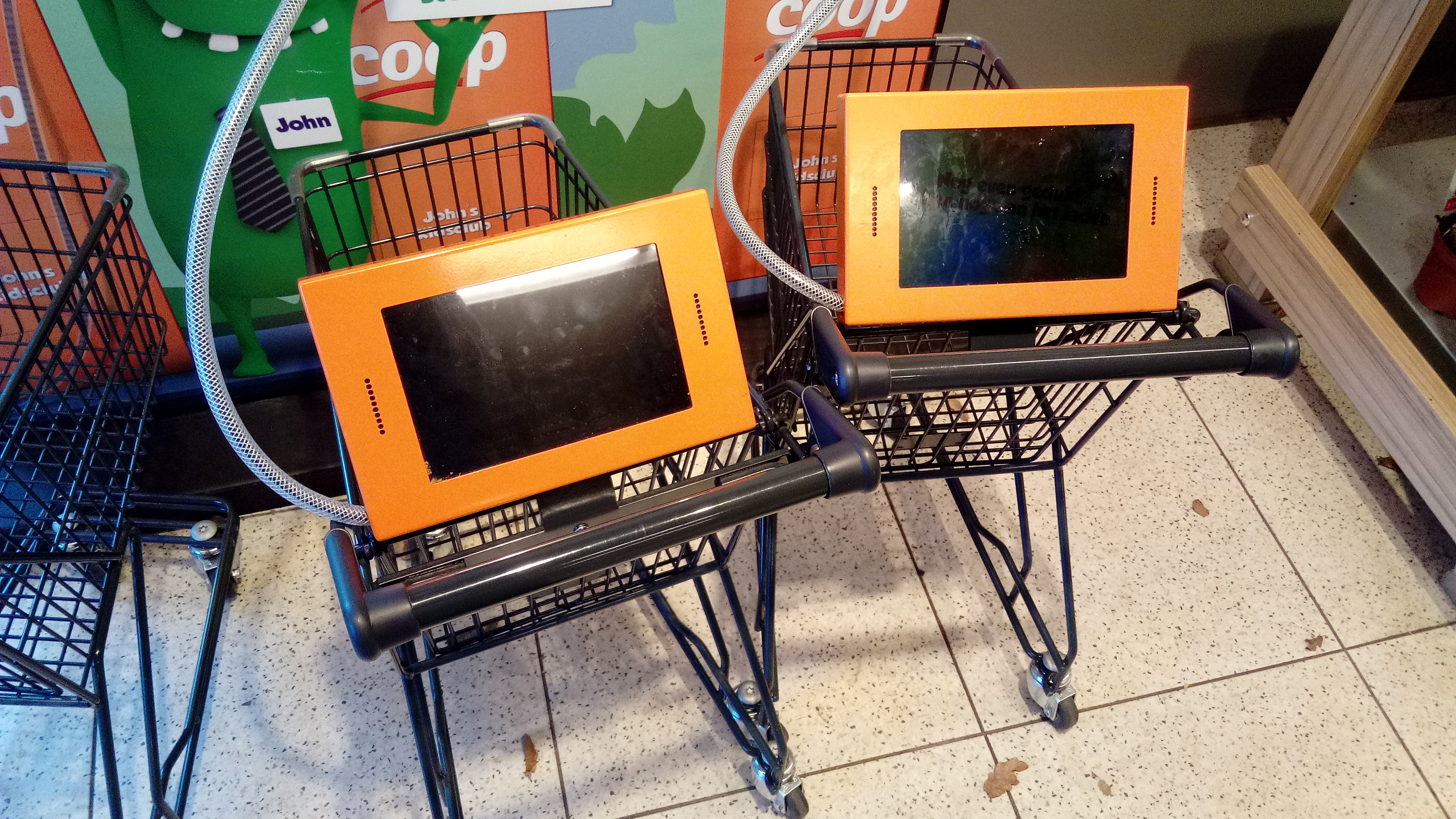
Shopping carts for children fitted with gaming computers

A video game is a computer-controlled game in which a video display, such as a monitor or television set, is the primary feedback device. There must also be some sort of input device, usually in the form of button/joystick combinations, a keyboard and mouse combination, a controller, or a player's motion. It will have a set of rules that are engaged in to reach a goal or outcome.

=== Audio recording and reproduction ===
Sound recording and reproduction is the electrical or mechanical re-creation or amplification of sound, often as music. This involves the use of audio equipment such as microphones, recording devices and loudspeakers. From early beginnings, with the invention of the phonograph using purely mechanical techniques, the field has advanced with the invention of electrical recording, the mass production of the 78 record, the magnetic wire recorder followed by the tape recorder, and the vinyl LP record. The invention of the compact cassette in the 1960s, followed by Sony's Walkman, gave a major boost to the mass distribution of music recordings, and the invention of digital recording and the compact disc in 1983 brought massive improvements in ruggedness and quality.

=== Internet media ===
The internet is a more interactive medium of mass media, and can be briefly described as "a network of networks". Specifically, it is the worldwide, publicly accessible network of interconnected computer networks that transmit data by packet switching using the standard Internet Protocol (IP). It consists of millions of smaller domestic, academic, business and governmental networks, which together carry various information and services, such as email, online chat, file transfer, and the interlinked web pages and other documents of the World Wide Web.

The internet is the system of interconnected computer networks, linked by copper wires, fibre-optic cables, and Wireless connections, while the Web is the content of the internet linked by hyperlinks and URLs. The World Wide Web is accessible through the internet, along with many other services including e-mail, file sharing and others described below.

Toward the end of the 20th century, the advent of the World Wide Web marked the first era in which most individuals could have a means of exposure on a scale comparable to that of mass media. Forms of internet media include blogs, microblogs, RSS feeds, and podcasts.

=== Mobile ===
Mobile phones were introduced in Japan in 1979 but became a mass medium only in 1998 when the first downloadable ringtones were introduced in Finland. Soon most forms of media content were introduced on mobile phones, tablets and other portable devices. Similar to the internet, mobile is also an interactive media.

=== Print media ===
==== Magazine ====
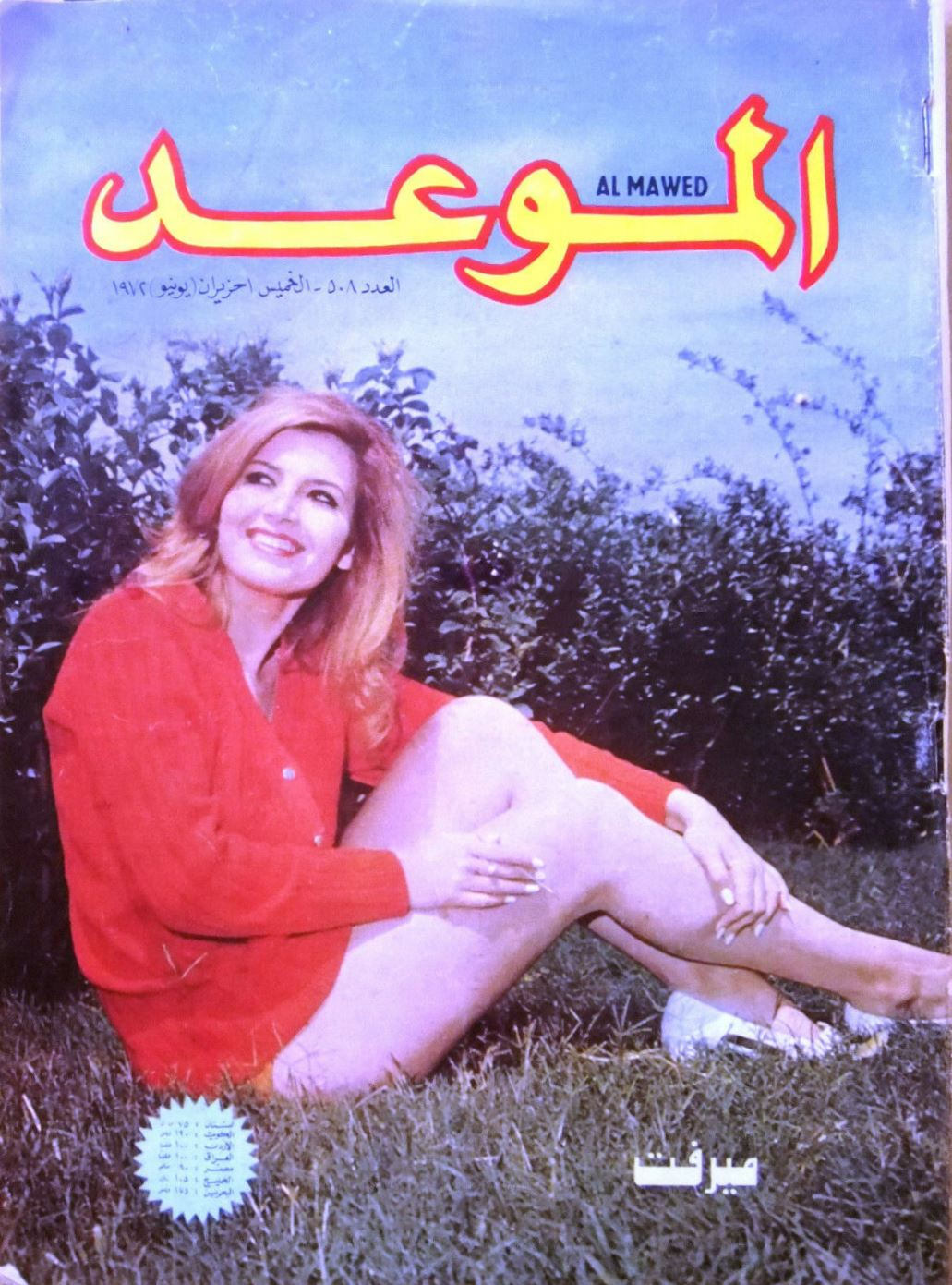
Actress Mervat Amin on the cover for Al-Mawwid magazine, June 1972

A magazine is a periodical publication containing a variety of articles, generally financed by advertising or purchase by readers. Magazines are typically published weekly, biweekly, monthly, bimonthly or quarterly, with a date on the cover that is in advance of the date it is actually published. They are often printed in colour on coated paper, and are bound with a soft cover.

==== Newspaper ====
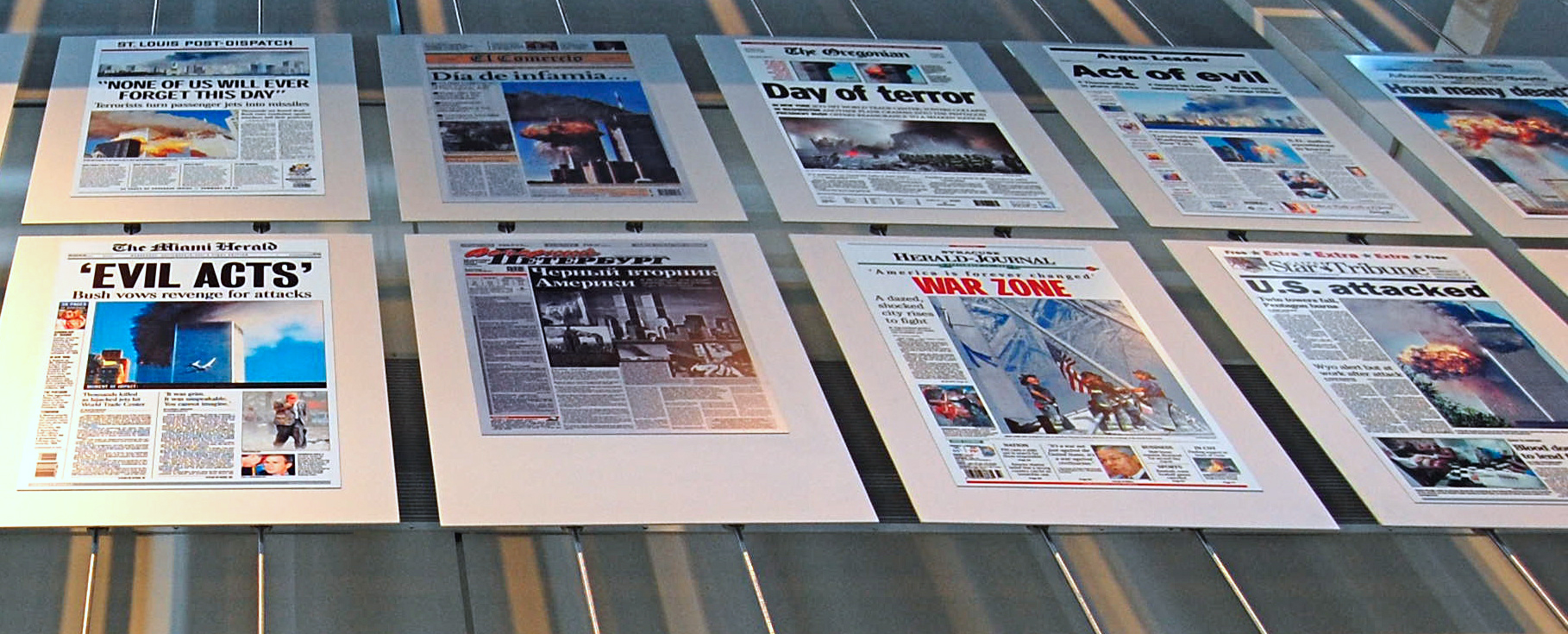
A panel in the Newseum in Washington, D.C., showing newspaper headlines from the day after 9/11

A newspaper is a publication containing news, information, and advertising, usually printed on low-cost paper called newsprint. It may be general or special interest, and is usually published serially, most often daily or weekly. The dominant function of newspapers is to inform the public of significant events. Newspapers originated after the invention and spread of the printing press by Johann Gutenberg around 1450, with the first newspaper being the German-language Relation aller Fürnemmen und gedenckwürdigen Historien, first published in 1605. The increasing prevalence of internet-based news media has, while challenging newspapers as an alternative source of information and opinion, has also provided a new platform for mass media organisations to reach new audiences. As such, in the twenty-first century, newspaper circulation has fallen in almost all regions.

=== Outdoor media ===
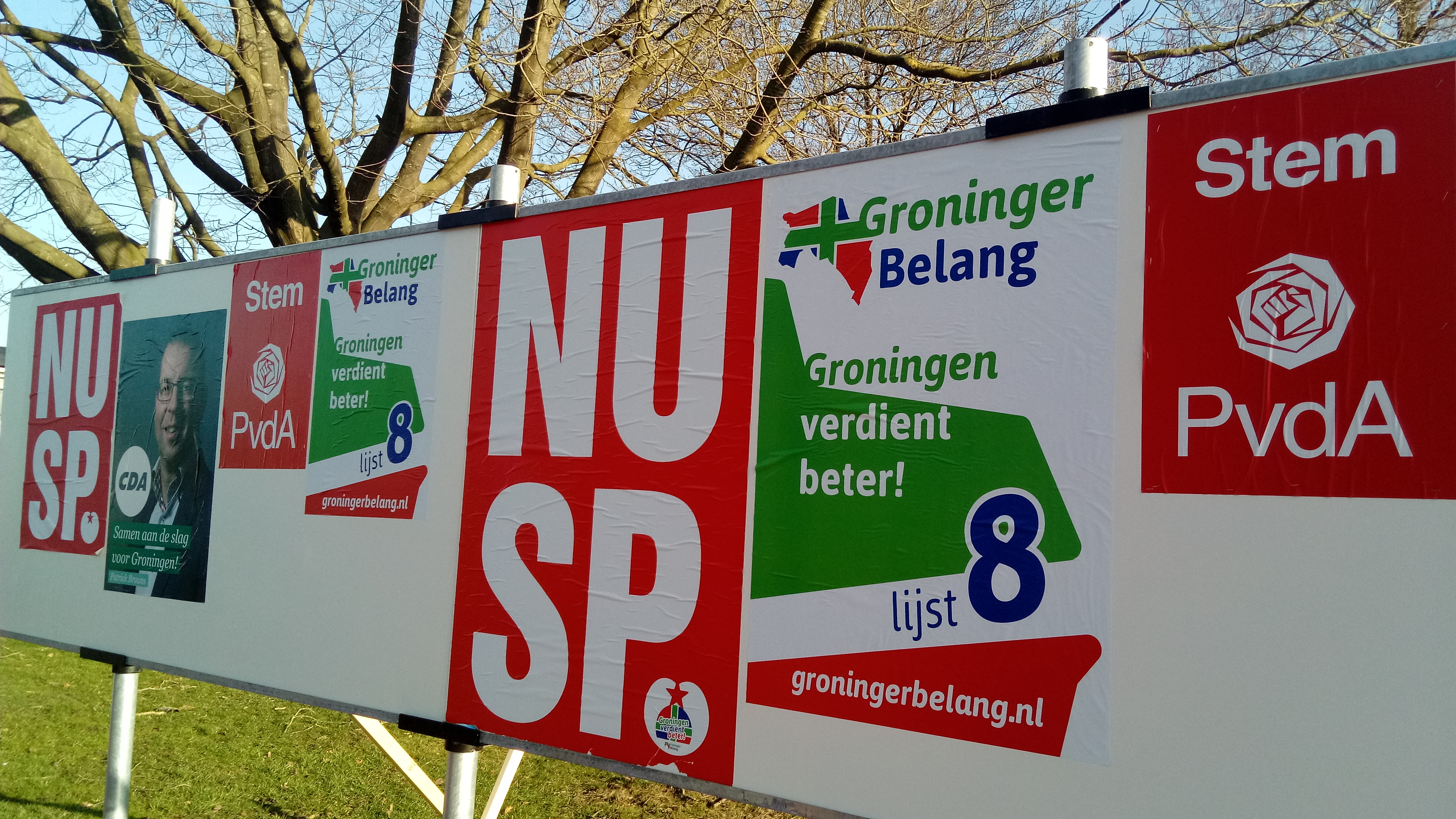
Political advertisements on a billboard in the Netherlands in 2019

Outdoor media is a form of mass media which comprises billboards, signs, placards, flying billboards, blimps, skywriting, and augmented reality advertising. Many commercial advertisers use this form of mass media when advertising in sports stadiums.

== Professions ==
=== Journalism ===
Journalism is the discipline of collecting, analyzing, verifying and presenting information regarding current events, trends, issues and people.

=== Public relations ===
Public relations is management of communication between an organisation and its key publics to build, manage and sustain its positive image.

=== Publishing ===
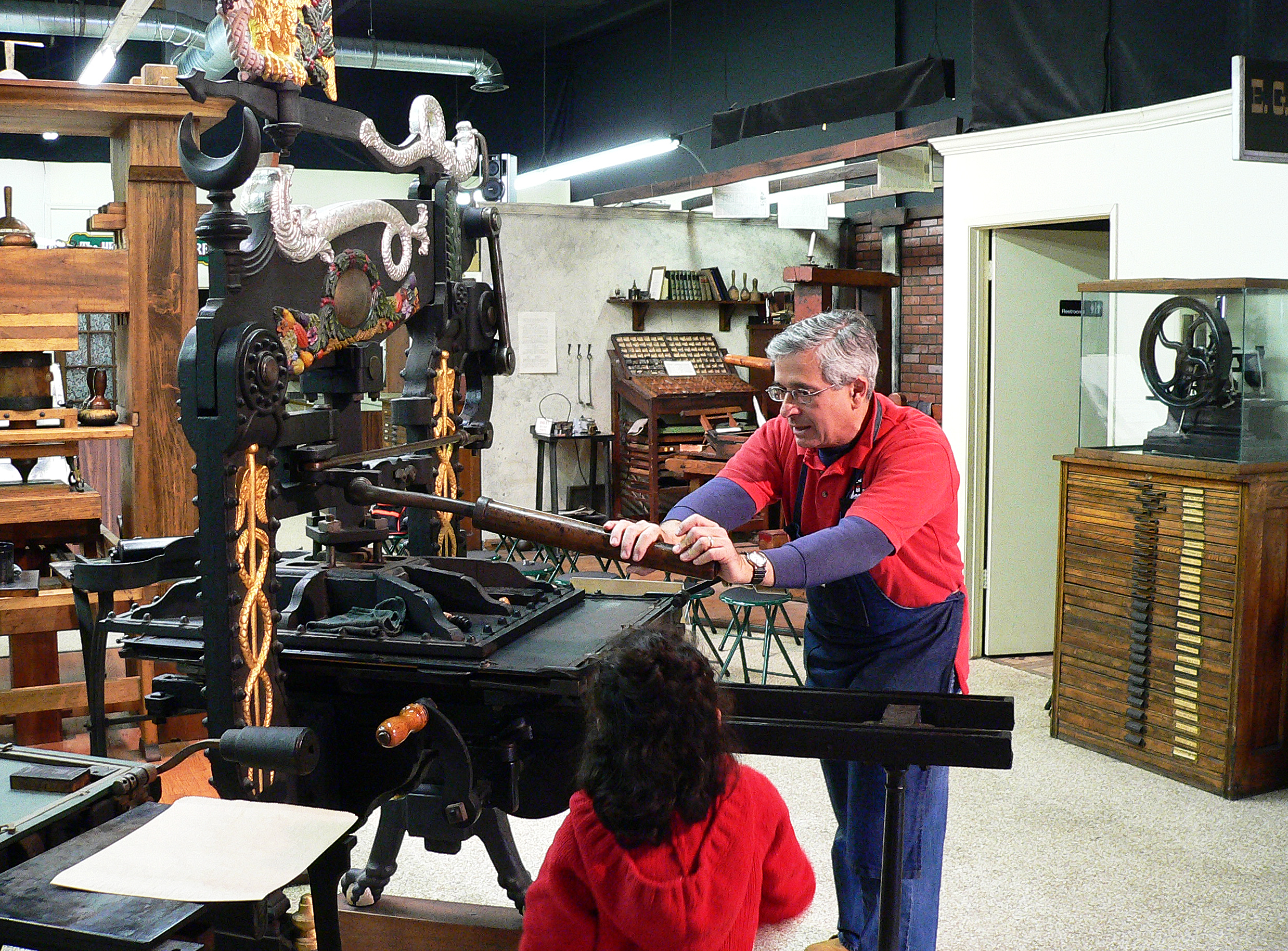
A member of staff at the International Printing Museum demonstrates printing with a 19th-century, hand-operated Columbian press.

Publishing is the industry concerned with the production of literature or information – the activity of making information available for public view. In some cases, authors may be their own publishers. Traditionally, the term refers to the distribution of printed works such as books and newspapers. With the advent of digital information systems and the internet, the scope of publishing has expanded to include websites, blogs and the like.

==== Software publishing ====
A software publisher is a publishing company in the software industry between the developer and the distributor. In some companies, two or all three of these roles may be combined (and indeed, may reside in a single person, especially in the case of shareware).

=== Internet celebrity ===
An internet celebrity is anyone who gained fame on the internet, usually (but not always) from social media.

== Mass media studies ==
When mass media study began, it was the standard to study, which differs from the more fragmented social 21st century networks. As such, some critiques claim mass media no longer exists, or at least that it does not exist in its previous form. Theorist Lance Bennett says that excluding a few major events in recent history, it is uncommon for a group big enough to be labeled a "mass" to be watching the same news via the same medium of mass production. Bennett argues that today it is more common for a group of people to be receiving different news stories, from completely different sources; thus, mass media has been re-invented.

Due to the widespread use of social media and the rapid development of information technology, the media landscape has undergone significant changes. As a result, the Hallin and Mancini media model, based on traditional indicators, no longer fully aligns with today’s media ecosystem. While television continues to target a more mature audience and uphold professional journalism standards, digital journalism and social media tend to adapt those standards to align more closely with audience preferences.

Social media is a large contributor to the change from mass media to a new paradigm – the line between mass communication and interpersonal communication is blurred. This original form of mass media put filters on what the general public would be exposed to in regards to "news" – something that is harder to do in a society of social media.

=== Social issues and criticism ===
Lack of focus on local or specific topics is a common criticism of mass media. A mass news media outlet often chooses to cover national and international news to be relevant and to serve a wide demographic. As such, it can skip over many interesting or important local stories because they do not interest the majority of their viewers.

The term "mass" suggests that the recipients of media products constitute a vast sea of passive, undifferentiated individuals. This is an image associated with some earlier critiques of "mass culture" and mass society, which generally assumed that the development of mass communication has had a largely negative impact on modern social life, creating a homogeneous culture which entertains individuals without challenging them. However, interactive digital media have also been seen to challenge the read-only paradigm of earlier broadcast media.

Contemporary research demonstrates an increasing level of concentration of media ownership, with many media industries already highly concentrated and dominated by a small number of firms.

==== Discrimination and bias ====
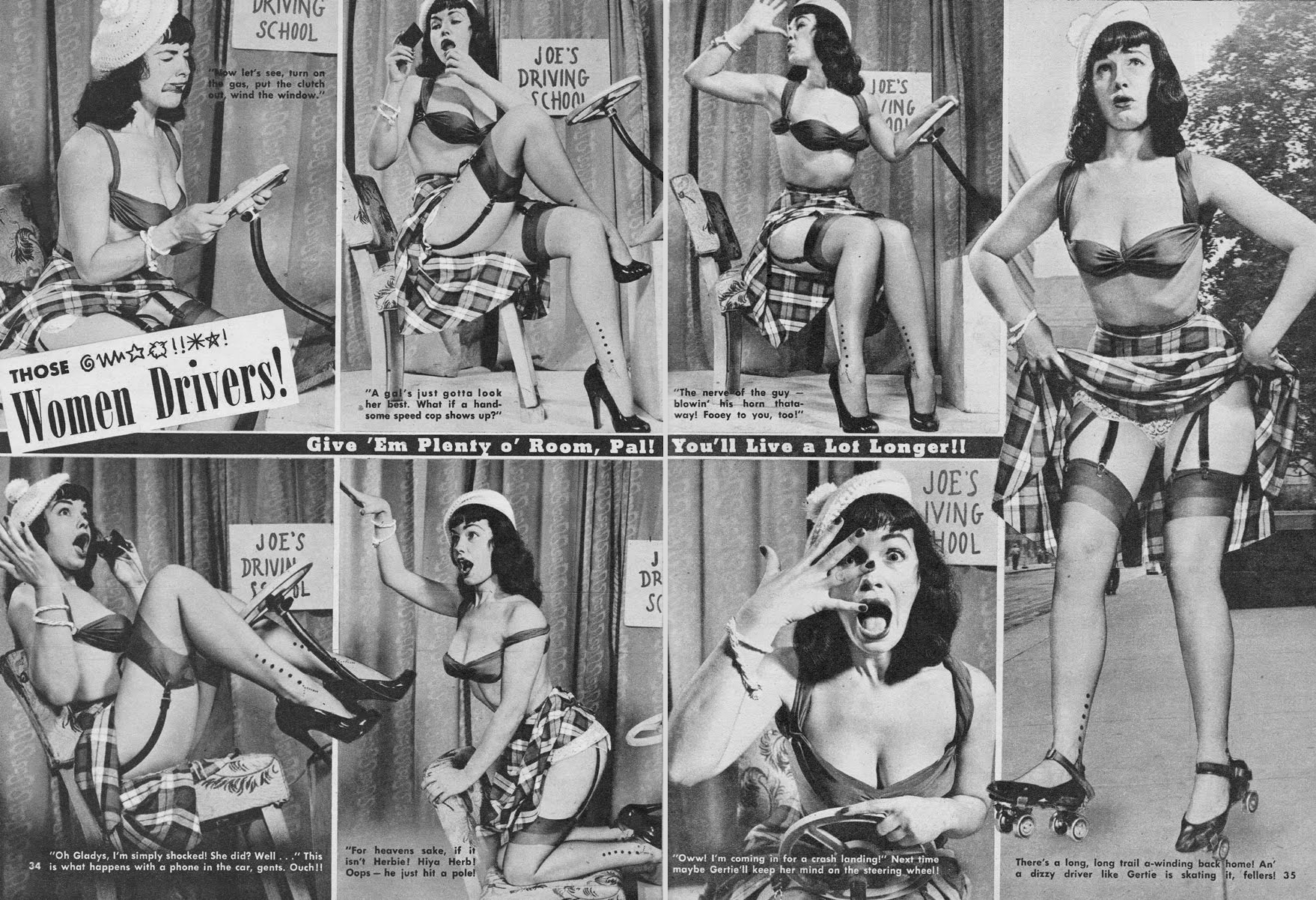
A magazine feature from Beauty Parade from 1952 stereotyping women drivers (featuring Bettie Page)

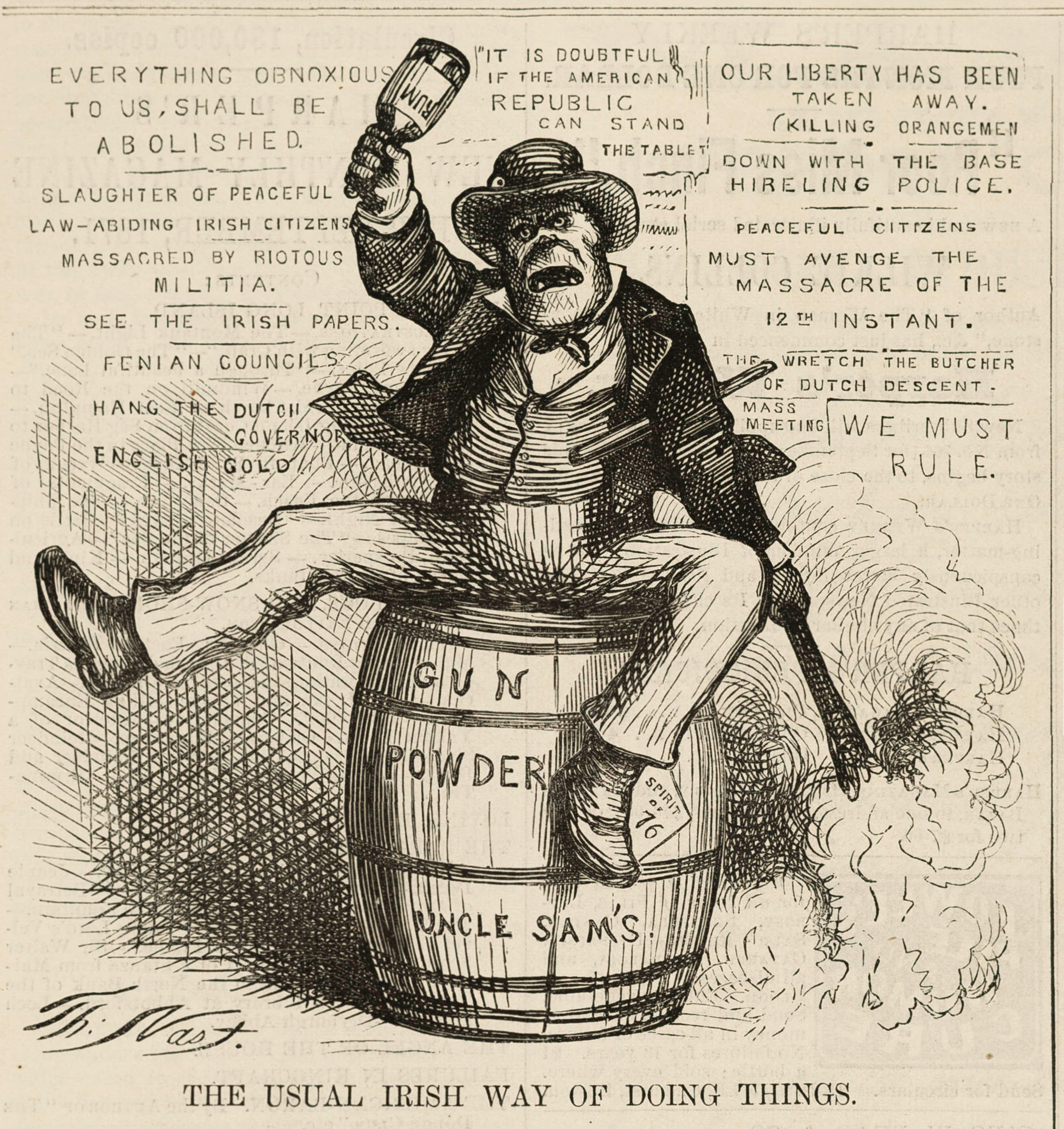
American political cartoon titled The Usual Irish Way of Doing Things, depicting a drunken Irishman sitting on a powder keg holding a lit torch and swinging a bottle. Harper's Weekly, 1871.

Mass media sources, through framing and agenda-setting, can affect the impact of a story, by highlighting particular facts and information. This can correlate with how individuals perceive certain groups of people, as the media coverage a person receives can be limited and may not reflect the full situation. Stories are often covered to reflect a particular perspective, sometimes to target a specific demographic. Mass media, as well as propaganda, can reinforce or introduce stereotypes to the general public.

One example is how mass media has played a large role in the way white Americans perceive African Americans. Historical media focus on African Americans in the contexts of crime, drug use, gang violence and other forms of antisocial behaviour has resulted in a distorted and harmful public perception of African Americans. In his article "Mass Media and Racism", Stephen Balkaran states: "The media has played a key role in perpetuating the effects of this historical oppression and in contributing to African Americans' continuing status as second-class citizens." Negative portrayal of men in media has been claimed to contribute to harmful public perception of men.

=== Influence and sociology ===
In 1997, J. R. Finnegan Jr. and K. Viswanath identified three main theories of the effects or functions of mass media:

- The Knowledge Gap: the mass media influences knowledge gaps due to factors such as appeal, accessibility, and desirability of media content, as well as the amount of social conflict and diversity there is in a community.
- Agenda Setting: people are influenced in how they think about issues due to the selective nature of what media groups choose for public consumption. J. J. Davis states that "when risks are highlighted in the media, particularly in great detail, the extent of agenda setting is likely to be based on the degree to which a public sense of outrage and threat is provoked". When wanting to set an agenda, framing can be invaluably useful to a mass media organisation. Framing involves "taking a leadership role in the organisation of public discourse about an issue". The media is influenced by the desire for balance in coverage, and the resulting pressures can come from groups with particular political action and advocacy positions. Finnegan and Viswanath say "groups, institutions and advocates compete to identify problems, to move them onto the public agenda, and to define the issues symbolically".
- Cultivation of Perceptions: the extent to which media exposure shapes audience perceptions over time is known as cultivation. Television is a common experience, especially in places like the United States, to the point where it can be described as a "homogenising agent" (S. W. Littlejohn). However, instead of being merely a result of the TV, the effect is often based on socioeconomic factors. Having a prolonged exposure to TV or movie violence might affect a viewer to the extent where they actively think community violence is a problem, or alternatively find it justifiable. The resulting belief is likely to be different depending on where people live. Mass media normalizing violence can contribute to a culture of violence and rape culture.

Since the 1950s, when cinema, radio and TV began to be the primary or only source of information for most of the population, these media became the central instruments of mass control. When a country reaches a high level of industrialisation, the country itself "belongs to the person who controls communications", according to Umberto Eco.

Mass media play a significant role in shaping public perceptions on a variety of important issues, both through the information that is dispensed through them and through the interpretations they place upon this information. They also play a large role in shaping modern culture, by selecting and portraying a particular set of beliefs, values and traditions as reality. By portraying a certain interpretation of reality, they shape reality to be more in line with that interpretation. Mass media also play a crucial role in the spread of civil unrest activities such as anti-government demonstrations, riots and general strikes. The use of radio and television receivers has made the unrest influence among cities not only by the geographic location of cities, but also by proximity within the mass media distribution networks.

Media artist Joey Skaggs has demonstrated the ease with which mass media can be manipulated using fabricated press releases, staged events, and fictitious experts. His long-running series of media hoaxes reveal how news outlets can be drawn to sensational narratives, often publishing stories with minimal fact-checking. Skaggs' work has been cited as a critique of journalistic practices and a case study in the vulnerabilities of modern media systems.

Limited-effects theory theorizes that because people usually choose what media to interact with based on what they already believe, media exerts a negligible influence. Class-dominant theory argues that the media reflects and projects the view of a minority elite, which controls it. Culturalist theory combines the other two theories and claims people interact with media to create their own meanings out of the images and messages they receive.

== See also ==
- Commercial broadcasting – Practice of airing radio and television advertisements for profit
- Digital rights management – Technology to control access to copyrighted works and prevent unauthorized copying
- History of newspaper publishing
- Internet censorship – Legal control of the internet
- Journalism – Production of reports on current events
- Media conglomerate – Large company involved in mass media industry
- Media echo chamber
- Media economics – Application of economic questions to media
- Media regulation
- Media-system dependency
- Mediatization (media) – Process whereby the mass media influence other sectors of society
- State media – Media under editorial control of a government

== Sources ==
- Eco, Umberto (2014) [1967]. Travels in Hyperreality: Essays. Translated by Waever, William. San Diego: HMH. ISBN 978-0-547-54596-7.
- Finnegan, John R. Jr.; Viswanath, K. (2008). "Communication Theory and Health Behavior Change: The Media Studies Framework". Health behavior and health education: theory, research, and practice (4th ed.). San Francisco, CA: Jossey-Bass. ISBN 978-0-7879-9614-7.
- Lorimer, Rowland & Scannell, Patty (1994). Mass Communications: A Comparative Introduction. Manchester University Press. pp. 26–27. ISBN 978-0-7190-3946-1.
- Riesman, David and Gitlin, Todd and Glazer, Nathan (1950) The Lonely Crowd, preview at google books
- Vipond, Mary (2000). The mass media in Canada. James Lorimer & Company. p. 88. ISBN 978-1-55028-714-1.
- This article incorporates text from a free content work. Licensed under CC BY SA 3.0 IGO (license statement/permission). Text taken from World Trends in Freedom of Expression and Media Development Global Report 2017/2018, 202, UNESCO.
