= Overview of 21st-century propaganda =

Evolution of propaganda into the modern age

Since the end of the 20th century, propaganda has evolved significantly. In the 21st century, propaganda is largely disseminated through the news, internet and on social media platforms such as Twitter. Modern propaganda still utilises classic tactics such as name-calling and bandwagoning in order to sway the audience toward or against a particular belief. Pieces of "traditional" propaganda are typically created and distributed by larger entities or organisations, while modern propaganda can be created and spread by vast numbers of individuals simultaneously online. Modern propaganda can take many forms, ranging from memes to mainstream partisan news.

== Middle East ==
=== Afghan War ===
In the 2001 invasion of Afghanistan, psychological operations tactics were employed to demoralise the Taliban and to win the sympathies of the Afghan population. At least six EC-130E Commando Solo aircraft were used to jam local radio transmissions and transmit replacement propaganda messages. Leaflets were also dropped throughout Afghanistan, offering rewards for Osama bin Laden and other individuals, portraying Americans as friends of Afghanistan and emphasising various negative aspects of the Taliban. Another shows a picture of Mohammed Omar in a set of crosshairs with the words: "We are eating frogs."

=== Iraq War ===
Both the United States and Iraq employed propaganda during the Iraq War. The United States established campaigns towards the American people on the justifications of the war while using similar tactics to bring down Saddam Hussein's government in Iraq.

==== Iraqi propaganda ====
The Iraqi insurgency's plan was to gain as much support as possible by using violence as their propaganda tool. Inspired by the Vietcong's tactics, insurgents were using rapid movement to keep the coalition off-balance. By using low-technology strategies to convey their messages, they were able to gain support. Graffiti slogans were used on walls and houses praising the virtues of many group leaders while condemning the Iraqi government. Others used flyers, leaflets, articles and self-published newspapers and magazines to get the point across.

Insurgents also produced CDs and DVDs and distributed them in communities that the Iraq and the US Government were trying to influence. The insurgents designed advertisements that cost a fraction of what the US was spending on their ads aimed at the same people in Iraq with much more success. In addition, a domestic Arabic language television station was established with the aim of informing the Iraqi public of alleged coalition propaganda efforts in the country.

==== US propaganda in Iraq ====
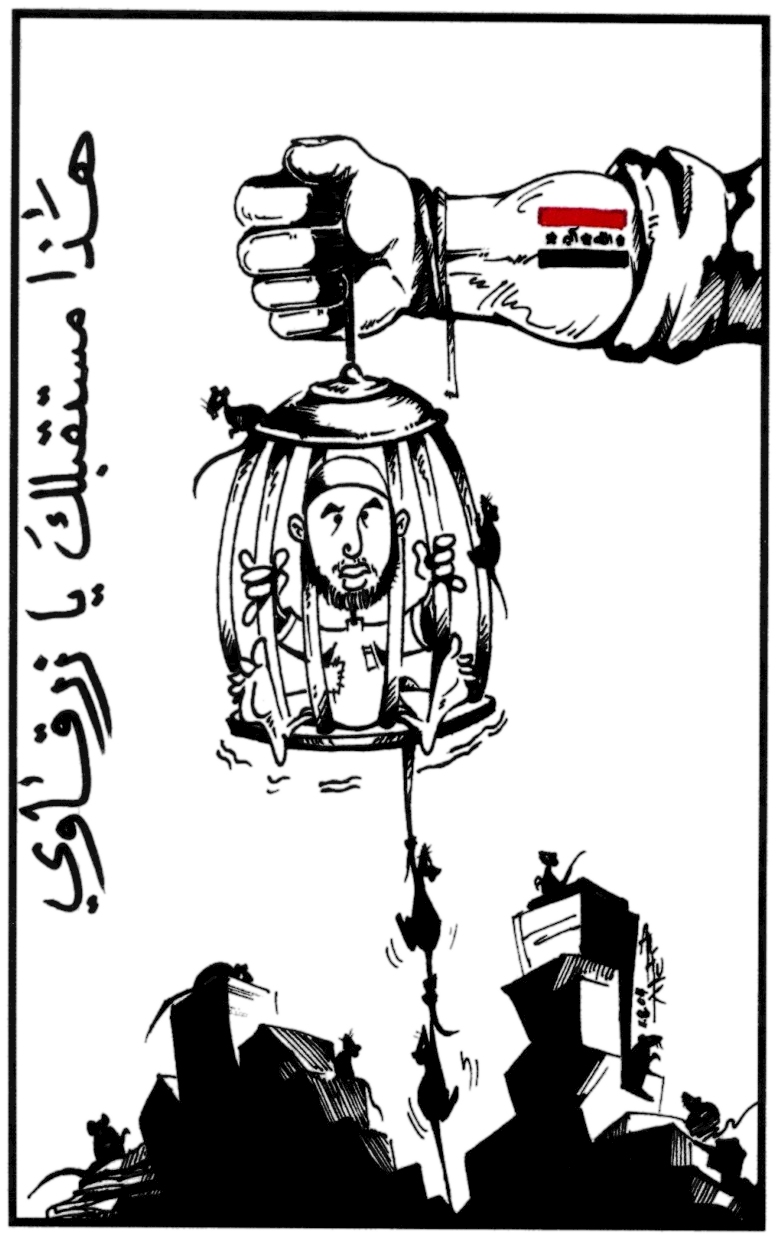
US PSYOP pamphlet disseminated in Iraq. The pamphlet says: "This is your future, Al-Zarqawi", and shows Al-Qaeda fighter Al-Zarqawi caught in a rat trap.

To achieve their aim of a moderate, pro-western Iraq, US authorities were careful to avoid conflicts with Islamic culture that would produce passionate reactions from Iraqis, but differentiating between "good" and "bad" Islam has proved challenging for the US.

The US implemented black propaganda by creating false radio personalities that would disseminate pro-American information, but supposedly run by the supporters of Saddam Hussein. One radio station used was Radio Tikrit. Another example of use of black propaganda is that the United States paid Iraqis to publish articles written by US troops in their newspapers under the idea that they are unbiased and real accounts; this was brought forth by The New York Times in 2005. The article stated that it was the Lincoln Group who had been hired by the US government to create the propaganda. However, their names were later cleared from any wrongdoing.

The US was more successful with the Voice of America campaign, which is an old Cold War tactic that exploited people's desire for information. While the information they gave out to the Iraqis was truthful, they were in a high degree of competition with the opposing forces after the censorship of the Iraqi media was lifted with the removal of Saddam from power.

In November 2005, the Chicago Tribune and the Los Angeles Times alleged that the United States military had manipulated news reported in Iraqi media in an effort to cast a favourable light on its actions while demoralising the insurgency. Lt. Col. Barry Johnson, a military spokesman in Iraq, said the program is "an important part of countering misinformation in the news by insurgents", while a spokesman for former Defense Secretary Donald H. Rumsfeld said the allegations of manipulation were troubling if true. The Department of Defense confirmed the existence of the program.

==== Propaganda aimed at US citizens ====
The extent to which the US government used propaganda aimed at its own people is a matter of discussion. The book Selling Intervention & War, by Jon Western, argued that president Bush was "selling the war" to the public.

President George W. Bush gave a talk at the Athena Performing Arts Centre, at Greece Athena Middle and High School, Tuesday, May 24, 2005, in Rochester, New York. About halfway through the event, Bush said: "See, in my line of work, you got to keep repeating things over and over, and over again, for the truth to sink in, to kind of catapult the propaganda."

While the United States' official stance was to remove Saddam Hussein's power in Iraq with allegations that his government held weapons of mass destruction or was related to Osama bin Laden, over time the Iraq war as a whole has been seen in a negative light. Video and picture coverage in the news has shown images of torture being done under the Iraqi Government.

The U.S. Military has provided millions in funding to professional sports organizations in exchange for pro-military messaging, such as a "salute" to active duty soldiers and war veterans.

== North Korea ==
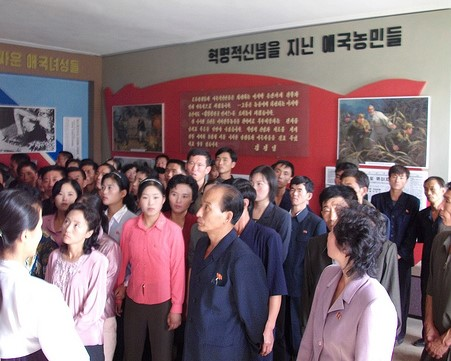
North Koreans touring the Museum of American War Atrocities.

Every year, several cartoons (called geurim-chaek in North Korea) are released, many of which are smuggled across the Chinese border and, sometimes, end up in university libraries in the United States. The books are designed to instill the Juche philosophy of Kim Il Sung (the "father" of North Korea)—radical self-reliance of the state. The plots mostly feature scheming capitalists from the United States and Japan who create dilemmas for naïve North Korean characters.

DPRK textbooks claim that US missionaries came to the Korean Peninsula and committed barbarous acts against Korean children, including injecting dangerous liquids into the children and writing the word "THIEF" on the forehead of any child who stole an apple for missionary-owned orchards in Korea.

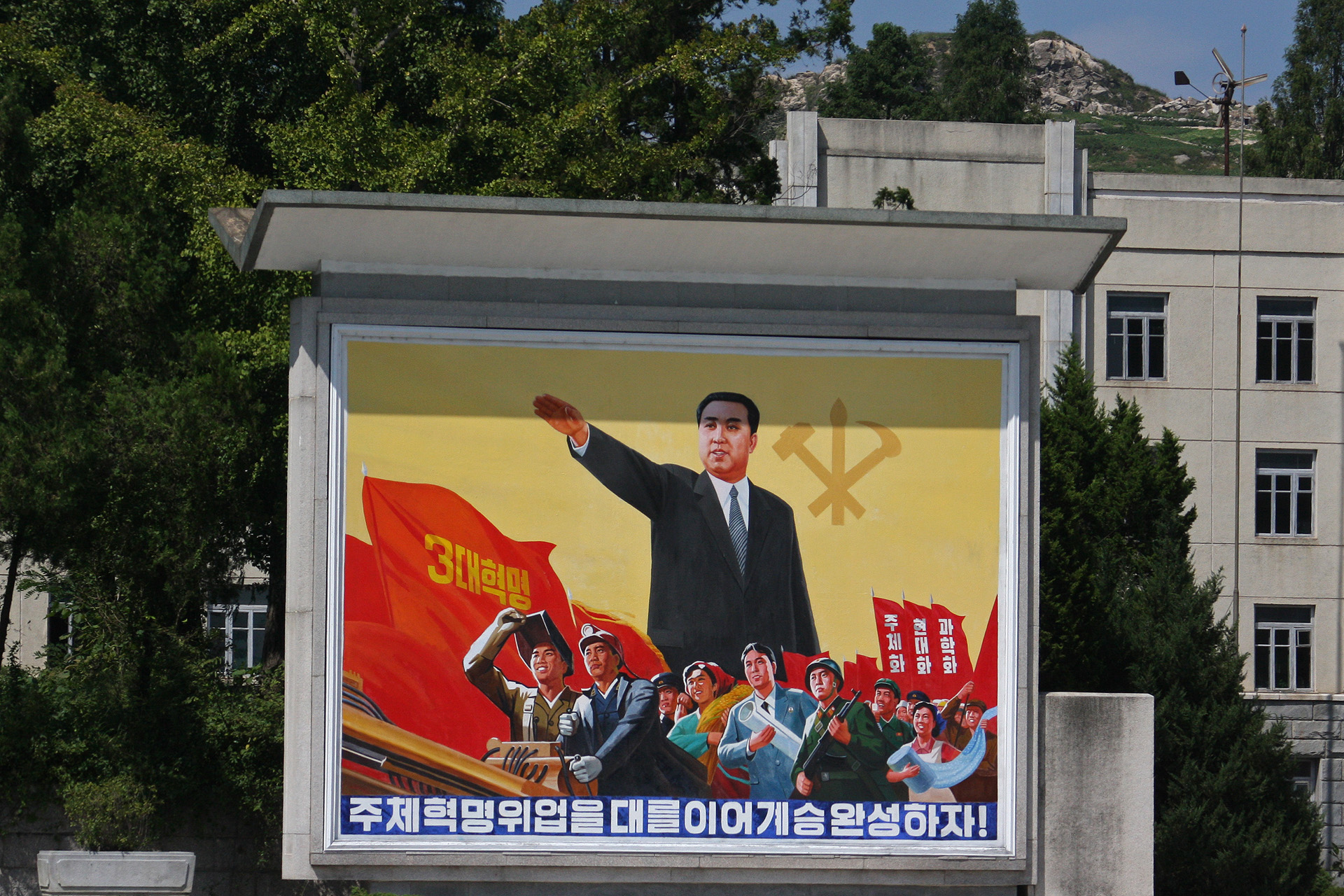
Example of North Korean propaganda cartoon. "North Korea - Propaganda poster" by Roman Harak is licensed under CC BY-SA 2.0.

Past leaders of North Korea such as Kim Il-Sung never considered tourism an important priority and only promoted it through some brochures and magazines focusing on North Korea's scenery and culture. Kim Jong Il made an effort to incorporate tourism as a larger priority for economic purposes, allowing U.S citizens into the country beginning in 2010. Regarding current leader Kim Jong Un, tourism has become a "national development priority" and a means of propaganda in order to shift the country's negative image away towards a more positive image. Classified as "heritage tourism," the goal is to promote North Korean culture and show their ways of being and living, such as North Korea's unique interpretation of communism and authoritarian government. Although prior leaders Kim Il Sung and Kim Jong Il have focused on promoting successful rulership and power through tourism, Kim Jong-Un has focused more so on changing the image of the country to encourage more tourism so as to bring greater profit into the country. North Korea has an international reputation of widespread poverty, abuse of power, an extremely strict autocratic and authoritarian government, and isolation from the outside world. Attempting to combat this image, the government has made greater use of the internet and social media for North Korean tour agencies to promote travel blogs and tourist-style photos to give themselves a more "human face" that is appealing to Western tourists. There are now over 40 international tour companies which bring foreigners into the DPRK. Various social media posts have assisted the country in changing their image, with many tourists expressing positive experiences, emotions, and memories on social media after their trips. All that being said, the North Korean government is very strict with regards to keeping tourism numbers low so as to not let foreigners interact much with North Korean citizens.

== Mexican drug cartels ==
Drug cartels have been engaged in propaganda and psychological campaigns to influence their rivals and those within their area of influence. They use banners and narcomantas to threaten their rivals. Some cartels hand out pamphlets and leaflets to conduct public relation campaigns. They have been able to control the information environment by threatening journalists, bloggers and others who speak out against them. They have elaborate recruitment strategies targeting young adults to join their cartel groups. They have successfully branded the word narco, and the word has become part of Mexican culture. There is music, television shows, literature, beverages, food and architecture that all have been branded narco.

== United States ==
The Shared Values Initiative was a public relations campaign that was intended to promote the continued acceptance of Muslims living in the United States to foreigners across the world. Funded by the United States Department of State, the campaign created a public relations front group known as Council of American Muslims for Understanding (CAMU). The campaign was divided in phases; the first of which consisted of five mini-documentaries for television, radio, and print with shared values messages for key Muslim countries.

== People's Republic of China ==
Propaganda is used by the Chinese Communist Party to sway public and international opinion in favour of its policies. Domestically, this includes censorship of proscribed views and an active cultivation of views that favour the government. Propaganda is considered central to the operation of the Chinese government. The term in general use in China, xuanchuan (宣傳 "propaganda; publicity") can have either a neutral connotation in official government contexts or a pejorative connotation in informal contexts. Some xuanchuan collocations usually refer to "propaganda" (e.g., xuānchuánzhàn 宣传战 "propaganda war"), others to "publicity" (xuānchuán méijiè 宣傳媒介 "mass media; means of publicity"), and still others are ambiguous (xuānchuányuán 宣传员 "propagandist; publicist").

Aspects of propaganda can be traced back to the earliest periods of Chinese history, but propaganda has been most effective in the twentieth and twenty-first centuries, following the Chinese Civil War, owing to mass media and an authoritarian government. China in the era of Mao Zedong is known for its constant use of mass campaigns to legitimise the state and the policies of leaders. It was the first Chinese government to successfully make use of modern mass propaganda techniques, adapting them to the needs of a country which had a largely rural and illiterate population. In poor developing countries, China spreads propaganda through methods such as opening Confucius Institutes, and providing training programs in China for foreign officials and students.

The Chinese Dream is an example of mass media being used to promote propaganda in the 21st century. The overall message of its propaganda was a new start for China through posters and displays. Visuals were used in order to shape the thinking of people considering past historical and social events. Posters showing rural environments, peasants, and folk art were intended to mix both the past and present of China.

As the internet is becoming more advanced, China has begun to implement technology into their media and mass propaganda techniques. China has created their own digital applications throughout the recent years in order for its government to spread their word through more efficient communication. An instance where an uproar occurred was an Internet water army, where false rumors about the Coronavirus in Wenzhou and the nuclear pollution in Fukushima was spread throughout social media platforms. Because of the catastrophic outcomes, the government had taken stricter precautions with social media. WeChat was monitored in 2014 by the government for any sensitive posts (which later were deleted) and censored to minimize the possibility of any false rumors spreading.

== Vietnam ==
Posters hanging everywhere often describe unity of the working class, farmers and soldiers under the leadership of the Communist Party of Vietnam and Ho Chi Minh. The teachings of ethics and ideology of Ho Chi Minh are a mandatory part of the school curriculum throughout Vietnam.
