= Suggestion theory =

Suggestion theory is a theory used in the early part of the 20th century to describe how persuasion worked as a phenomenon of human collective behavior. Because a distinctive function of public communication is to advance social consensus, many scholars of the 19th and 20th centuries sought to understand the role of human communication in the process of social influence. Writing in 1904, Roy Park recognized suggestion theory as the "suggestive influence exerted by people on each other." To understand suggestion, Park focused on studies of collective behavior like rallies and crowds, noting that "when two or more people come in contact... a 'circular process' of mutual suggestibility gets triggered" However, scholars used different terms, including imitation, sympathy, reciprocal suggestion and prestige suggestion to describe the role of human communication in consensus formation. During the 1920s and 1930s, rising interest in the nature of propaganda accelerated interest in suggestion theory, which drew upon ideas from the emerging field of psychoanalysis. Yet, by the 1960s, suggestion theory had become a "lost doctrine" as it was effectively marginalized by scholars aiming to establish communication scholarship as a new discipline. Instead of emphasizing how humans engage in reciprocal suggestion to influence each other's attitudes and behavior, communication scholars critiqued studies of propaganda and persuasion, and emphasized the idea that media had only limited effects on individuals in society. A focus on rational argumentation replaced examination of popular suggestibility, propaganda, and persuasion.

== Historical context ==
At a time when scholarly inquiry was becoming more specialized and fields of sociology and psychology were brand new, many scholars were trying to understand how social influence occurred. Suggestion theory drew upon studies of crowd behavior, social movements, public opinion, rumor, and fashion, and it was situated at the intersection of the new academic disciplines of sociology and psychology, which were rival traditions. The new field of communication which was established in the post-World War II era did not embrace the earlier generation's work in propaganda and social influence. Because new academic discipline of communication proclaimed itself to be cross-disciplinary and focused on "behavioral sciences," it rejected earlier scholarship and mislabelled it as the hypodermic needle theory, the idea that communication messages affected all people in the same way. During and after World War II, academics in many fields worked actively on behalf of the federal government. Communication scholars worked on propaganda campaigns for both domestic and foreign audiences. They had a vested interest in rejecting and marginalizing suggestion theory. According to Jefferson Pooley, suggestion theory "had a disqualifying impertinence: It failed to distinguish between good and bad persuasion." After World War II, communication departments in U.S. universities were created by bringing together scholars with an interest in interpersonal communication and those with an interest in mass communication, and they became unified under a theory called the two-step flow, the idea that mass media and interpersonal communication both function to influence public opinion. The shift to marginalize suggestion theory helped to cement "a détente in a young field where sociological and psychological inquiry into mass communication and interpersonal communication were envisioned as interdependent parts of the same field of study."

In the 1950s, suggestion theory was explored by psychologists and sociologists interested in conformity, and this theory emphasized that interpersonal networks acted as a buffer that protected individuals from the direct effects of mass communication. But an idealistic vision of interpersonal communication becomes less compelling in the age of the Internet, where anyone can create emotionally-compelling propaganda using memes and videos, and social networks are intentionally designed to cultivate outrage, creating stifling, conformity-inducing places where emotion trumps reason.
