= Trust No Fox on his Green Heath and No Jew on his Oath =

Children's book by Elvira Bauer

- Author: Elvira Bauer (1915 – after 1943)
- Original title: Trau keinem Fuchs auf grüner Heid und keinem Jud auf seinem Eid
- Illustrator: Elvira Bauer
- Language: German
- Genre: Children's book, picture book, nursery rhymes, antisemitic Nazi propaganda aimed at children
- Publisher: Stürmer-Verlag (Stürmer Publishing House), Nuremberg
- Publication date: 1936
- Publication place: Nazi Germany
- Media type: Print

Trust No Fox on his Green Heath and No Jew on his Oath! A Picture Book for Old and Young (Original title in German: Trau keinem Fuchs auf grüner Heid und keinem Jud auf seinem Eid! ein Bilderbuch für Gross und Klein) is an antisemitic children's picture book published in November 1936 in Nazi Germany. The book was written and illustrated by Elvira Bauer (1915 – after 1943), a kindergarten teacher, art student, and Nazi supporter. It was the first of three children's books to be published by Julius Streicher, the editor of the infamously antisemitic newspaper Der Stürmer, who was later executed for war crimes.

Through stereotypical Nazi caricatures, primitive nursery rhymes and colorful illustrations, children—and adults—are told what a Jew supposedly is and looks like according to the Nazi Party; the Jews are represented as "children of the devil," evil creatures who cannot be trusted, and a contrast to idealized "Aryans." Works of Nazi propaganda such as this were used to indoctrinate the youth of Germany in Nazi racial ideology. The book is written in Sütterlin cursive.

Trust No Fox on his Green Heath went through seven editions, and at least 70,000 copies were printed. After Bauer moved to Berlin in 1943 and reported to an art school under the Reich Chamber of Culture and Fine Arts (Reichskammer der bildenden Künste) there are no known records of her later life or activities.

== Background ==
The Nazi Party and its leader, Adolf Hitler, had taken complete control of the Reichstag—the German Parliament—in 1933. This allowed Hitler to implement laws restricting and limiting the rights of different races and religions, including antisemitic laws—such as the Nuremberg Laws in 1935. After the formation of the Reich Ministry of Public Enlightenment and Propaganda in 1933, antisemitic publications in the forms of books, newspapers, radio broadcasts, and speeches were commissioned by the state. Joseph Goebbels, the propaganda minister, described the new ministry as a way of uniting the government and the people. The Nazi Party believed that they, by using propaganda, could unite the German people as a nation supporting their beliefs.

By 1935, the Jews in particular had become second-class citizens within Germany. This was both due to laws passed by the Nazi Party and the attitude of the Gentile population. The number of boycotts of Jewish business, throughout the 1930s, showed the antisemitic tendency within the German population. Antisemitism was allowed to spread; antisemitism and other forms of bigotry were codified and went unpunished in the German legal system. Historian Richard Grunberger argued that many in Germany wanted to see social change, and the idea of "folk community" was popular at the time. Antisemitism and many of the stereotypes used for the Jewish population was already present in much of Germany before the Nazis came to power.

After enacting the "editorial law" (Schriftleitergesetz) and other antisemitic publishing legislation, all forms of publication were censored by the Reich Chamber of Culture (Reichskulturkammer), and non-"Aryans" were forbidden from working as journalists, strengthening antisemitism among Gentiles in Germany. By the end of the 1930s Germany had created a racist system, where some areas of public life were reserved for "Aryans" and some for Jews, privileging "Aryans."

During the Nuremberg Trials against major German war criminals after the Second World War, Trust No Fox on his Green Heath was used as documentation of the deadly antisemitism in Nazi Germany.

It is pitiful and terrifying to think that tens of thousands of German children are poisoned – literally poisoned – by this disgusting product of vileness and imbecility. But since it unfortunately exists, and is in the hands of the German children, we should use it, too, as the strongest imaginable method of propaganda against the Reich of Hitler and Streicher.

— Klaus Mann on Trust No Fox On The Green Field And No Jew On His Oath, in Jewish Frontier 1937-09

If you want to know if something is good or bad, all you have to do is listen to what the Jew has to say. When the Jews of the world are railing against that picture book, it is a proof of its great value.

— The publisher's response to the foreign criticism of the book, Der Stürmer No. 10, March 1937

== Title ==
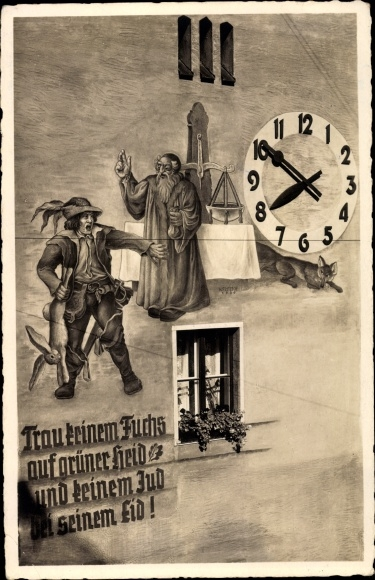
A Nazi propaganda postcard from the 1930s showing a mural in Nuremberg illustrating an old anti-Jewish saying attributed to Martin Luther: "Don't trust a fox whate'er you do, nor yet the oath of any Jew."

The title Trau keinem Fuchs auf grüner Heid und keinem Jud bei seinem Eid ("Don't trust a fox whate'er you do, nor yet the oath of any Jew.") refers to a rhymed antisemitic folk wisdom attributed to Martin Luther: "Trau keinem Wolf auf wilder Heiden / Auch keinem Juden auf seine Eiden / Glaub keinem Papst auf sein Gewissen / Wirst sonst von allen Drein beschissen" ("Trust no wolf in wild heathland / Also no Jew on his oath / Believe no Pope on his conscience / Otherwise, you will be screwed by all three").

== Analysis ==
Trau keinem Fuchs auf grüner Heid und keinem Jud auf seinem Eid is aimed at children. It tells children what a Jew is and how to identify them. This is done both through the text and the illustrations that accompany the text. Throughout the book, the author made a clear distinction between Germans and Jews. On the front cover, there is a picture of a fox and a picture of a man depicted as a Jew—he has a big nose, big ears and a chubby hand with a Star of David next to him.

The book is divided into ten sections:

- The Father of the Jews is the Devil
- The Eternal Jew
- Jewish names
- Once a Jew, always a Jew
- The Cattle Jew
- The Sabbath
- The Jewish Lawyer
- The Servant Girl
- The Jewish Doctor
- The Führer's Youth

=== The Father of the Jews is the Devil ===
In this section, Bauer wrote that the Jew works for the devil and that they can never be trusted. She asserted that "The Devil brought them to Germany" and that "like thieves, they stole our [Germany's] land." She described the Jew to always be "cursing and swearing with bent backs and oversized slippers." This is intended to inculcate in children, from an early age, the negative stereotype of Jews. Bauer also described a German in this section. A German "stands up" and "is a proud young man able to work and fight." This distinguishes the German as strong and the Jew as weak. Illustrations on the page further demonstrate this. The German, who has blond hair, is standing tall with a spade in his hand and a muscular body. The Jew, on the other hand, is fat, smoking and has big feet and big hands. The first section of this book is also written in rhyme, making it easier for children to understand it.

=== The Eternal Jew ===
In this section, Bauer linked Christianity to antisemitism. She blamed Jews for the death of Jesus and that since then they have "borne a curse" and should be avoided. They are seen "everywhere as a pest" like a fox and that "children to keep a look out." This taught Gentile children to fear and avoid Jews and Jewish children, since they might catch the Jewish curse. The illustration on this page depicts a man with scruffy hair, a big nose and a dark coat; he is surrounded by flames which links him to the Devil in the previous section.

The medieval character of the "Wandering Jew" was also demonized in a book and exhibition (1937) and a documentary (1940), all called The Eternal Jew (Der Ewige Jude), and other antisemitic Nazi propaganda.

=== Jewish Names ===
In this section, Bauer showed how to spot a Jew by their name. She described how Jews can be cunning with their names, and although some may sound German there are few differences. This represents another way in which children are being taught how to spot a Jew.

=== Once a Jew, always a Jew ===
In this section, Bauer told a story of a Jew who converts to being a Christian, but on a Friday he eats a goose. He claims that as he converted, a goose can be converted into a fish. She argued that as a goose cannot be a fish, a Jew cannot be a Christian and will always be a Jew. This was reinforced by the illustration as a man with a big nose, big feet, and big hands is eating meat on a Friday in front of a priest. This taught children that a Jew is sneaky and a liar.

=== The Cattle Jew ===
This section represents a Jew as greedy and only thinking about money; it taught children that Jews will always try to cheat Germans. The illustration is a colorful picture of a farmyard and the Jew taking animals from a German.

=== The Sabbath ===
In this section Bauer described how Jews are lazy and that on the Sabbath they expect Germans to do all the work. She taught that Jews are dishonest and keep all their money hidden away. The illustrations in this section again show a Jew to be fat, thus reinforcing what a Jew supposedly looks like. One of the pictures also shows the Jew with a fox, a common link used by the Nazi propaganda to represent them as sly and stealthy.

=== The Jewish Lawyer ===
This section tells how a Jewish lawyer took all a farmer's produce away so he could be represented in court. In the end the Jew becomes fat and the farmer has nothing left. The illustration for this section shows two scenes. The first scene is of a well-dressed farmer and a small, thin Jew. The second scene however shows a fat Jew and a poor-looking farmer. The story taught Gentile children that a Jew will take all their money and produce and leave them with nothing.

=== The Servant Girl ===
This section taught Gentile children about Gentile-Jew relationships. It depicted Jews as forcing themselves on Gentile women, contrasted with Gentile men refusing any relationship with Jewish women. This section taught Gentile girls to fear Jewish romantic and sexual advances and Gentile boys to fear any seduction from Jewish women.

=== The Jewish Doctor ===
In this section, Bauer portrayed a Jewish doctor as someone who will kill a German to save a Jew as he makes sure "that not one more Jew is saved from Hell." Bauer believed that a Jew will always go to Hell when they die, and the Jewish doctor is trying to stop that. This taught children that anything a Jew does is bad and imitating a Jew will send them to Hell.

This section praises Der Stürmer for its antisemitic stance. The colorful illustrations include depictions of Jews in a huddle next to crows, apparently plotting, while Der Stürmer is on the wall behind them. This illustrates the supposed untrustworthiness of Jews, characterized as "sneaky." This section also exhorts children—and their families—not to buy from Jewish shops, explaining the purported reasons for the absence of Jewish children from schools. The final part of this section idealized the removal of Jews in German society, creating a perfect "Fatherland."

=== The Führer’s Youth ===
The final section urged German youth join the Hitler Youth (Jungvolk for boys aged 10–14 and Hitlerjugend for boys aged 14–18) to stand together as one nation. On the other hand, the Jews are told to go away. A picture of grumpy-looking Jews walking under a sign that says "one-way road. Hurry. Hurry. The Jews are our misfortune" and in the text the phrase "what a disgusting picture" is used. This promoted a sense of urgency in ridding Jews in German society.

== Symbolism ==
Bauer used a number of animals to symbolize Jews throughout the book. The two animals that were used frequently are the fox and the crow. The fox in Greek legend often represented the devil but in Nazi Germany, other connotations were often given to the fox. Foxes were seen as sneaky and crafty and therefore fit well into antisemitic propaganda. The fox was also viewed as a carrier of rabies. By linking the fox with a Jew, it reinforced the idea that Judaism is a disease, like rabies. The fox was very common within German propaganda, and films such as Reynard the Fox and The Jew Animal were produced depicting the link between the fox and the Jew.

The other animal used throughout the book is the crow. They were often seen alongside Jews. Crows were associated with the Devil's work and connoting them with Jews implied that Jews were working with the Devil.

== See also ==
- Der Giftpilz
- Antisemitism and the New Testament
- Children's propaganda in Nazi Germany
- Reich Ministry of Public Enlightenment and Propaganda
