= Children's propaganda in Nazi Germany =

The Nazi Party (NSDAP) directed propaganda at children in Nazi Germany between the 1920s and 1945 to influence the values and beliefs of the future generation of German citizens according to their political agenda and ideology. The Nazi Party targeted children with mandatory youth organizations, school courses on racial purity, and antisemitic children’s books. The Nazi Party's propaganda took advantage of children's ignorance about the Jewish community. Although the Jewish population in Germany was the largest in central Europe, it was still a relatively small fraction of the overall population, with only 525,000 members (0.75% of the total German population).

== Youth organizations ==
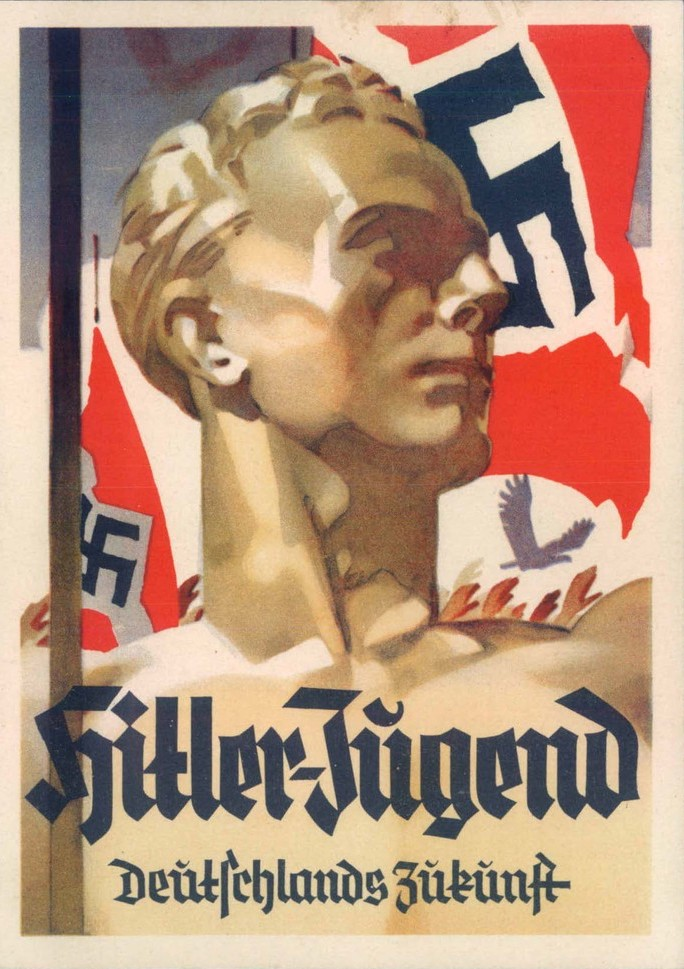
The Hitler Youth – Germany's future!, a Nazi Party propaganda postcard of an idealized 'Aryan'. Illustration: Ludwig Hohlwein 1933

Starting in the 1920s, the Nazi Party "targeted German youth as a special audience for its propaganda messages". They encouraged the formation of Nazi youth groups for children who were "dynamic, resilient, forward-looking, and hopeful." As the Nazi Party grew, the number of children they targeted increased. By 1936, "membership in Nazi youth groups became mandatory for all boys and girls between the ages of 10–17."

The Hitler Youth organization was founded in 1926 to train young boys for membership in the Sturmabteilung (SA; literally Storm Detachment), the Party's main paramilitary organization at the time. In 1933, leaders of the Hitler Youth decided to integrate boys into the Nazi national community and prepare them for service as soldiers in the Schutzstaffel (SS). Their practical methods of doing so included demonizing the previously existing independent youth organizations and replacing the concept and practice of youth hiking with marching in lock step. In fact, the Hitler Youth leadership officially banned the word "Wandern" (hiking) from their organization's language in 1937.

Membership of the Hitler Youth increased from 50,000 in January 1933 to more than 2 million by the end of the year. Before membership became mandatory in 1939, the group had surpassed 5.4 million members, with over 700,000 German youths holding leadership positions. Once membership in the Hitler Youth organization had become mandatory, "German authorities ... prohibited or dissolved competing youth organizations". The Nazi Party used the Hitler Youth and the League of German Girls as the primary tools to shape the minds of the German youth and create the illusion of a mass community that reached "across class and religious divisions that characterized Germany before 1933".

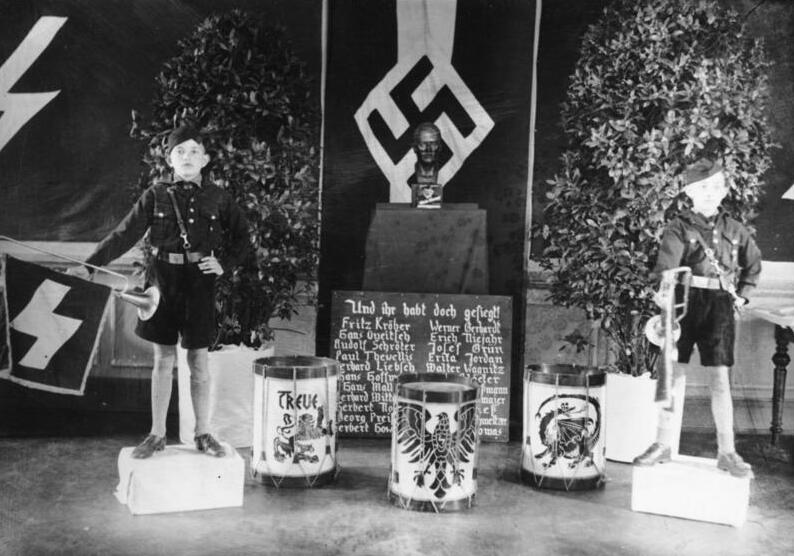
Young members of the Hitler Youth as honour guards for the Blutzeuge, Nazis "martyrs" who had been murdered by opponents in the political violence in Germany during the Weimar Republic and after the seizure of control in January 1933.
Photo: Bundesarchiv

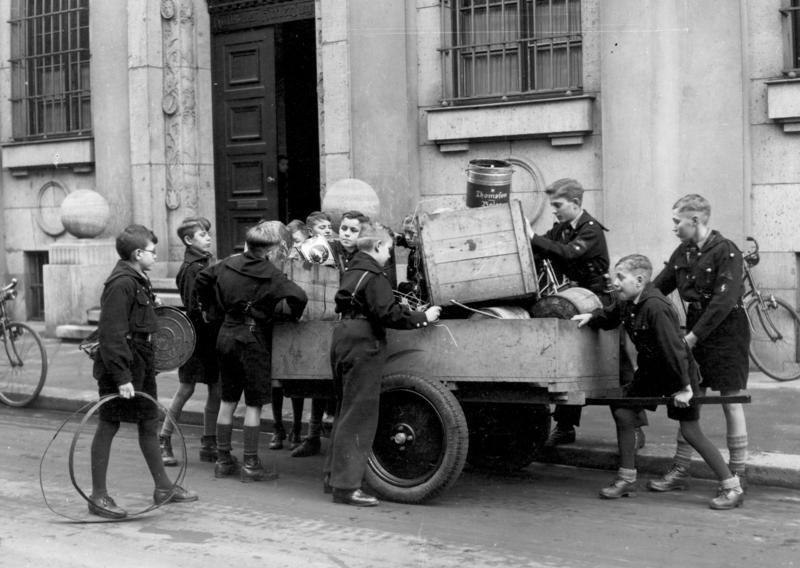
Jungvolk boys 1933 collecting metal for the German armament industry.
Photo: Bundesarchiv

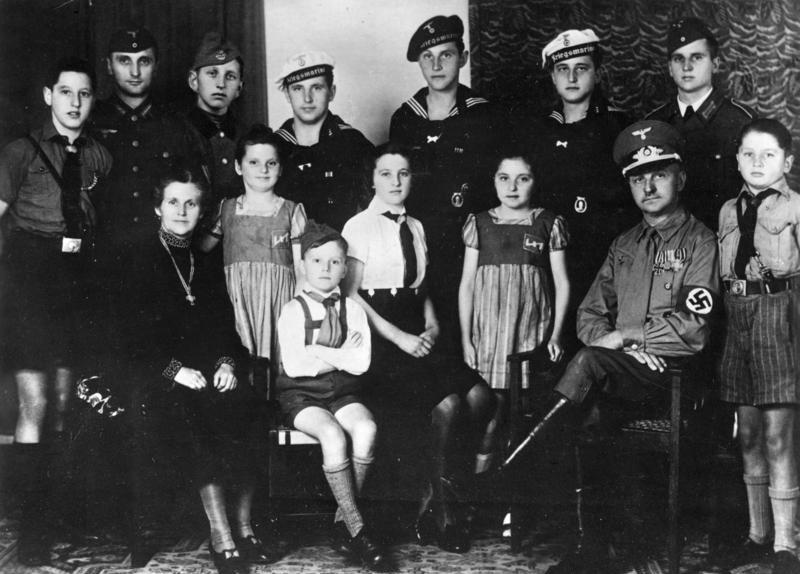
13.8.1943, The political Nazi leader Reichel (from Erdmannsdorf in Saxony) with his wife and twelve children all dressed in Nazi Party or military uniforms. The mother is decorated with the Cross of Honor of the German Mother. Five sons are with the German Wehrmacht; the sixth is with the Reich Labor Service. The smaller children are all members of Nazi youth organizations. The youngest girls have Wolfsangel symbols on their dresses; a sign for members in NS-Frauenschaft's Deutsche Kinderschar for children aged between 6 and 10.
Photo: Bundesarchiv (German Federal Archives)

== Participation in World War II ==
German field marshal Walter Model in October 1944 expresses his appreciation to a Hitler Youth leader for the entrenchment work carried out by the young men. Photo: Bundesarchiv

When boys reached age 18, they were required to enlist in the armed forces or into the Reich Labour Service and "were put through three weeks of rigorous training. The need for discipline and unquestioning obedience was drilled into the boys." Girls, on the other hand, were sent to Poland to help German farmers cultivate the land that had been seized from Poles during the course of World War II. They were required to work long hours helping inexperienced farmers work the fields, and they were also forced to act as nursemaids for the sick. In addition to this work, they had the responsibility of overseeing that the "Nazi rules and doctrine were not violated".

From 1943 to 1944, as Allied forces crossed the borders into Germany, the demands on the Hitler Youth intensified. German youths aged 16 were enlisted for active duty. Often these new soldiers fought in units alongside seniors who were over the age of sixty in the national militia (Volkssturm, literally People's Storm). As the war continued to turn in the Allied force's favor, the Nazi Party became desperate and began training boys as young as ten to handle and operate military-grade weaponry (machine guns, hand grenades, bazookas, etc.). Hitler Youth tank divisions were formed to fight in the Battle of the Bulge; the number of casualties rose steeply as "barely trained fifteen-year-olds [were] led by sixteen-year-olds".

== Propaganda through schools ==
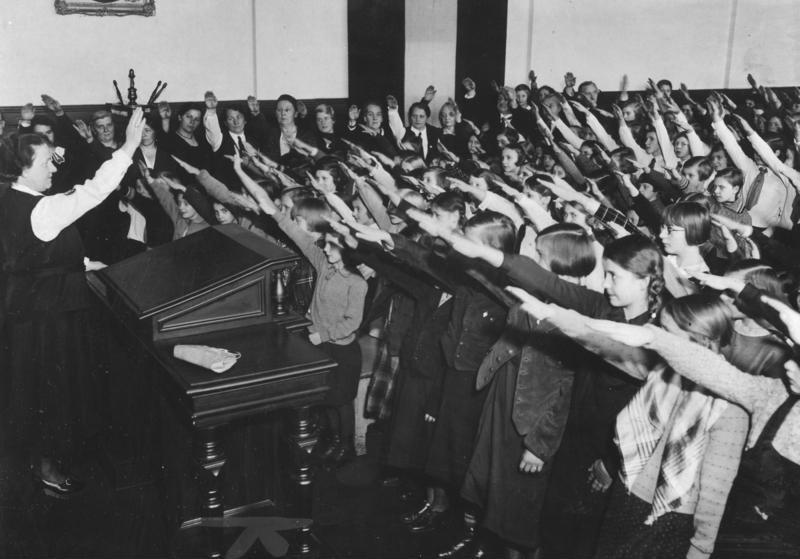
German school children 1934 celebrating Day of the founding of the German Empire with Nazi salutes. Photo: Bundesarchiv

Soon after the Enabling Act of 1933 had been passed, Jewish teachers and professors were dismissed from German schools and universities. By April 1933, there were no Jewish teachers remaining in schools attended by 'Aryan' students, a racial term used by the Nazis to describe the Germanic peoples.

In the educational system, Jewish children regularly experienced ridicule, from both their peers and teachers. For example, Jewish children would be sent to the back of the classroom to reiterate to the non-Jewish German children the notion that they were inferior to them. Additionally, "teachers would begin to pick out Jewish students in classrooms to use as examples during biology lessons about racial impurity. Jewish children would be told to stand at the front of the class, whilst teachers pointed to their eyes, ears, nose, mouth, and hair, comparing these to characteristics on Nazi propaganda sheets". Eventually, in 1938, the Jewish children were completely segregated from the non-Jewish German children in schools.

During the period of segregation, Jewish teachers were allowed to set up separate schools for Jewish students. This came, however, with its own set of issues for Jewish children, who were frequently beaten up and attacked by members of the Hitler Youth who "would wait outside at the end of the school day and set about beating Jewish boys as they left school". In 1942, Jewish children were banned from receiving education completely and were removed from schools prior to being sent to concentration camps.

From this point onward, schools heavily used propaganda to indoctrinate children into Nazi ideology. Textbooks and posters were used to teach German youth "the importance of racial consciousness". Students' school work was often provided in an ideological context. The following math problem is an example: "The Jews are aliens in Germany. In 1933, there were 66,000,000 people living in Germany. Of this total, 499,862 were Jewish. What is the percentage of aliens in Germany?" Textbook passages like this consistently reiterated the message of the racial inferiority of Jews, as well as the superiority of the German peoples they called the Aryan race, and how the German peoples deserved Lebensraum in Eastern Europe.

With the dismissal of Jewish educators, the National Socialist Teachers League required that only teachers who could prove they were "Aryan" were teaching the German youth. Every educator "was required to submit an ancestry table in triplicate with official documented proof" of their lineage. In addition, the league monitored courses for compliance with the Nazi Party's values. All educational courses had to reflect the aims of Hitler; of the required courses, they believed the most important was to teach German children racial theory and, by extension, the Jewish problem. By 1936, 97% of German educators belonged to the National Socialist Teachers League.

Children's books were created throughout the Nazi's reign to incite hatred for Jews at a young age. These books contained demeaning illustrations of Jewish people; in these books, Jewish people were depicted as "usually stocky ... the posture is crooked or bent; the feet are flat; the hair is dark; there is a lot of coarse body hair. The face usually has dark and bulging eyes, a crooked or bent nose, hanging eyelids, a hanging underlip, and a heavy beard." Furthermore, books such as Trau Keinem Fuchs auf grüner Heid und keinem Jud auf seinem Eid (in English, Trust No Fox on his Green Meadow and No Jew on his Oath), written by Elvira Bauer, aimed to reiterate to German children that the war "was being fought to save the Aryan world from the Jewish alien invaders within the midst". These books were distributed in schools with the sole purpose of teaching children Nazi ideologies.

Additionally, after-school activities and weekend trips were regularly sponsored by the Hitler Youth and the League of German Girls. These activities often acted as recruitment meetings for the participating school children. The Hitler Youth combined sports and physical outdoor activities with Nazi ideologies. Likewise, the League of German Girls emphasized collective athletics such as rhythmic gymnastics, which "German health authorities deemed less strenuous to the female body and better geared to preparing them for motherhood". This was also used for public display. Authorities wanted these sports and activities to encourage "young men and women to abandon their individuality in favor of the goals of the Aryan collective".

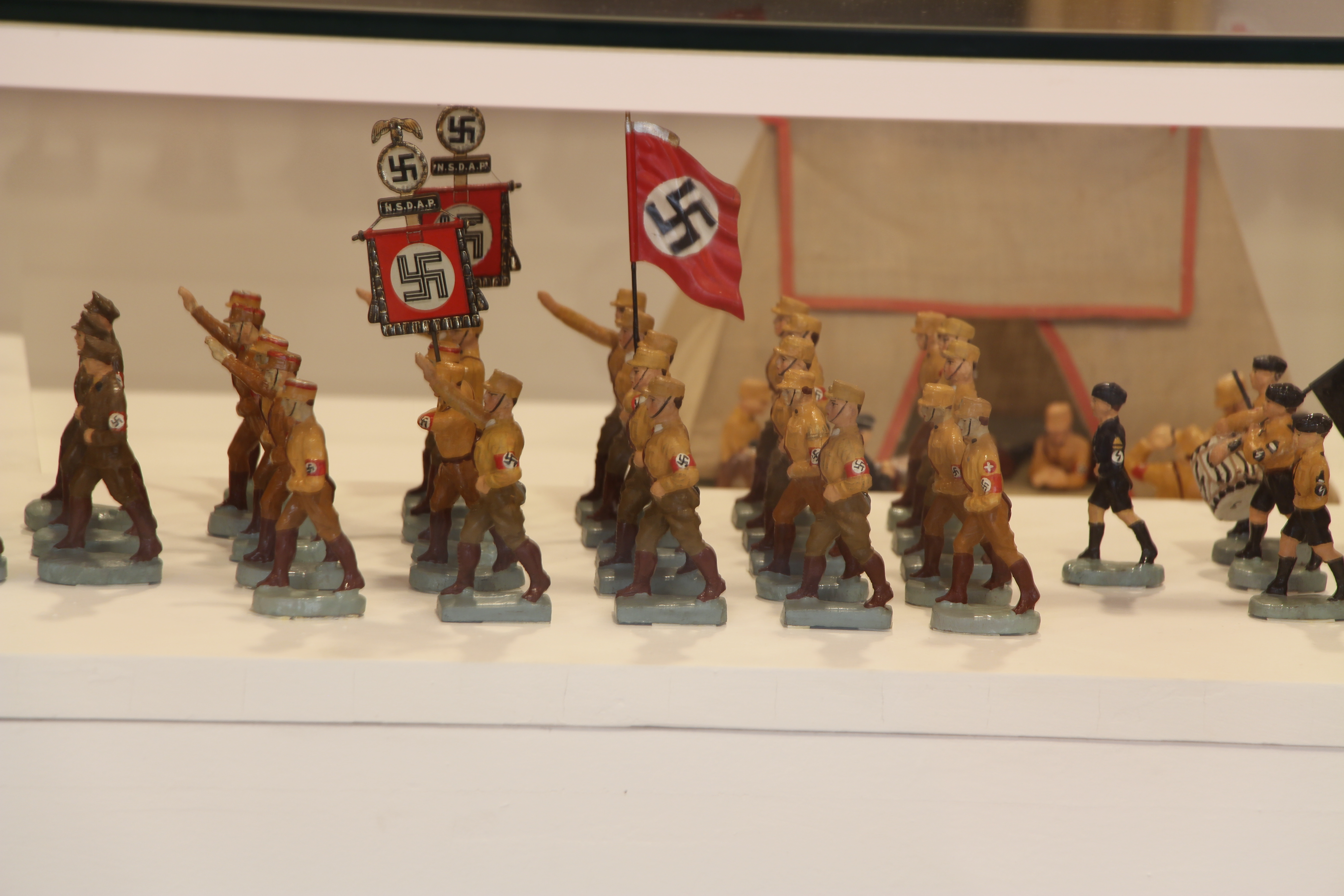
"Storm troopers" of the Sturmabteilung (SA, "brownshirts") and Pimpfe ("lads") of the Jungvolk as tin soldiers.

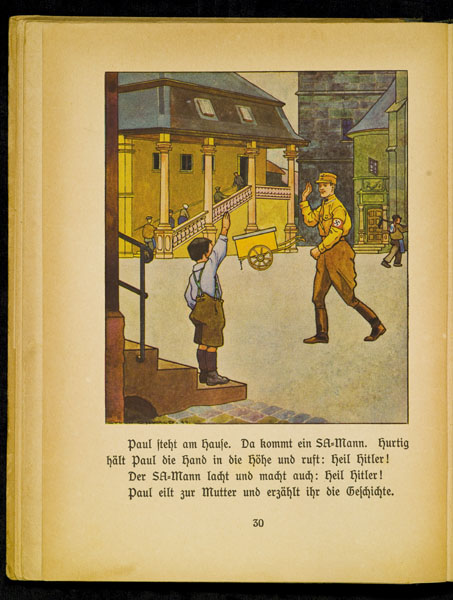
Reader for school children: Little Paul says "Heil Hitler" to a passing SA man.

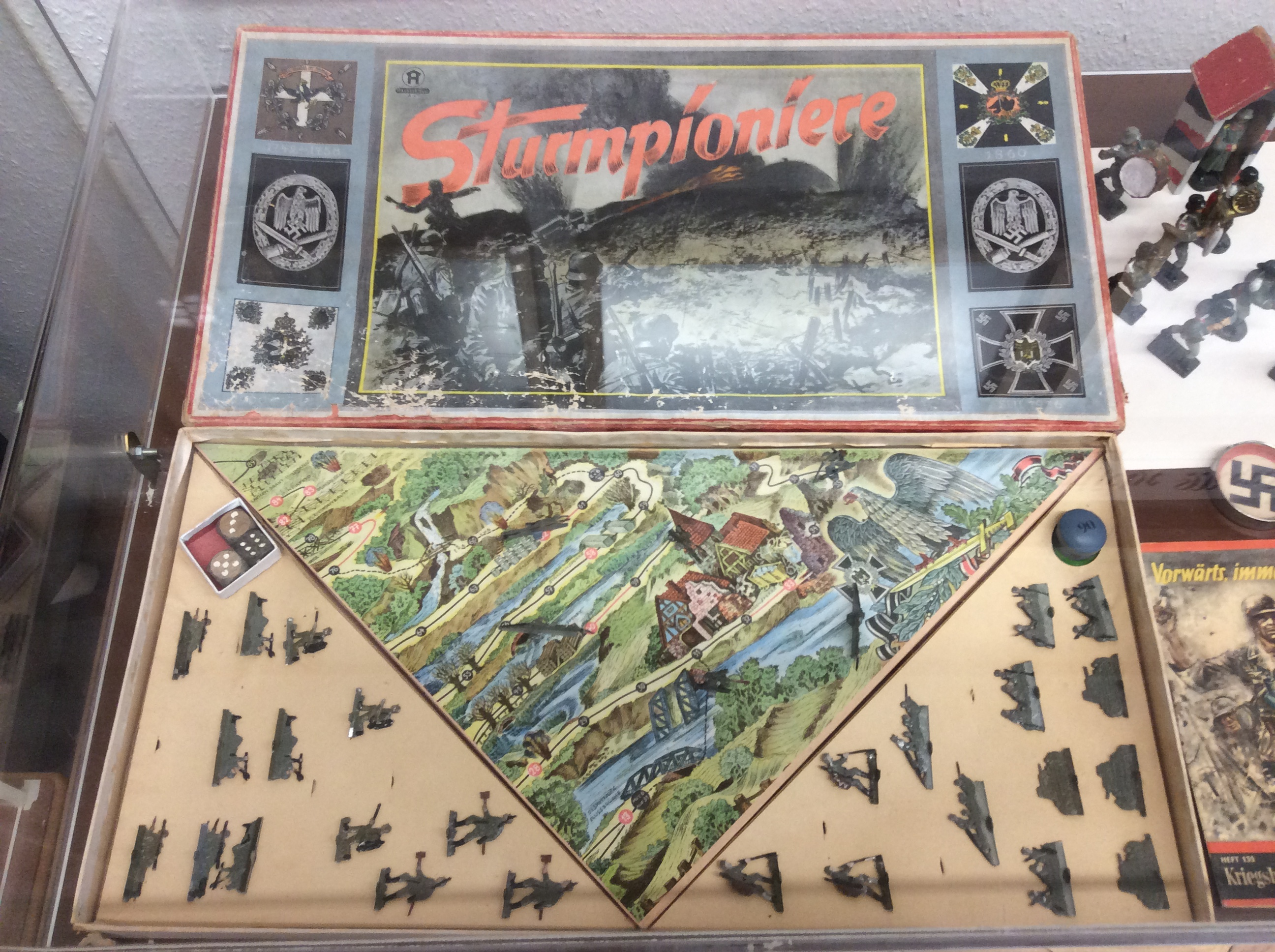
Sturmpioniere, a Nazi period war board game for children

== Effect of the propaganda on children ==
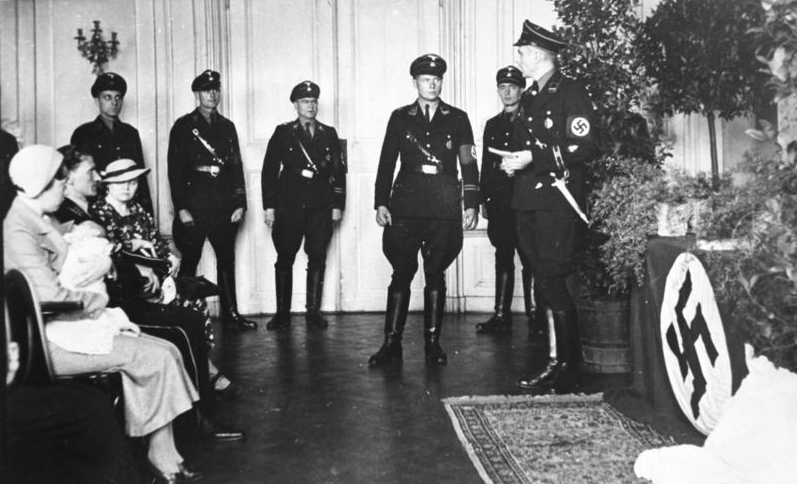
Christening of a Lebensborn child, c.1936-1944. The ceremony is conducted by members of the SS as a "Nazi cult ritual". Photo: Bundesarchiv

Hitler's ideologies were taught to the entire population of German children. These children were instructed in Nazi ideology from a very young age, and through this and mandatory membership in the youth organizations, children were taught to hate Jews. The youth of Nazi Germany came of age in the 1920s, 1930s, and early 1940s listening to racist and antisemitic lectures, reciting Nazi-inspired slogans, reading propaganda publications, and attending national youth rallies. The affected children were instructed to report any activities or conversations that could be considered treacherous. Children reported the activity of neighbors, teachers, religious leaders, and even their own family. Through these means, the youth of Germany were taught to respect, follow, and embrace the ideologies of the Nazi Party and those espoused by Hitler. The effect of propaganda on children would last for years after World War II ended.

In the last days of the war in Berlin, the Hitler Youth members of Werwolf could be heard singing, "Es zittern die morschen Knochen" (The frail bones tremble). The young members of Werwolf strongly believed that they were fighting for a just cause, and they felt disillusioned after the end of the war. In the ensuing years, Allied occupation authorities required German youths to undergo denazification programs that were designed to counter the adverse effects of the Nazi propaganda.

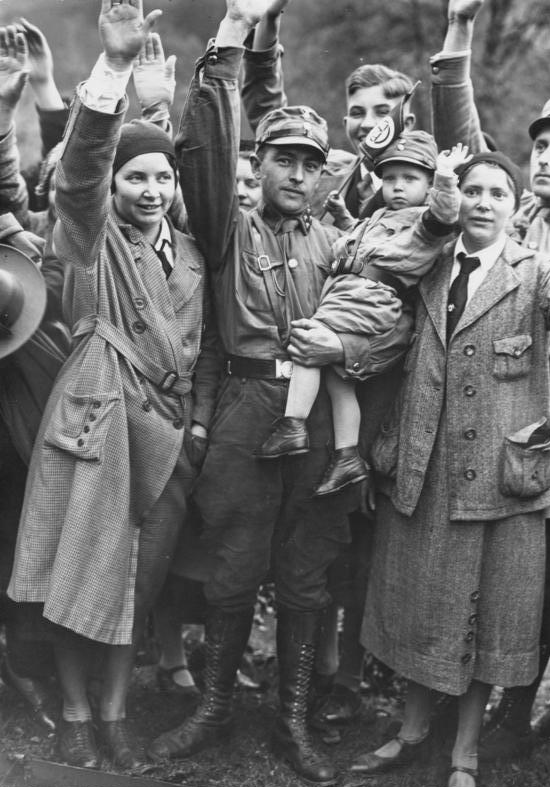
A man with a toddler on his arm in 1931, both in uniforms of the Nazi Party.
Photo: Bundesarchiv

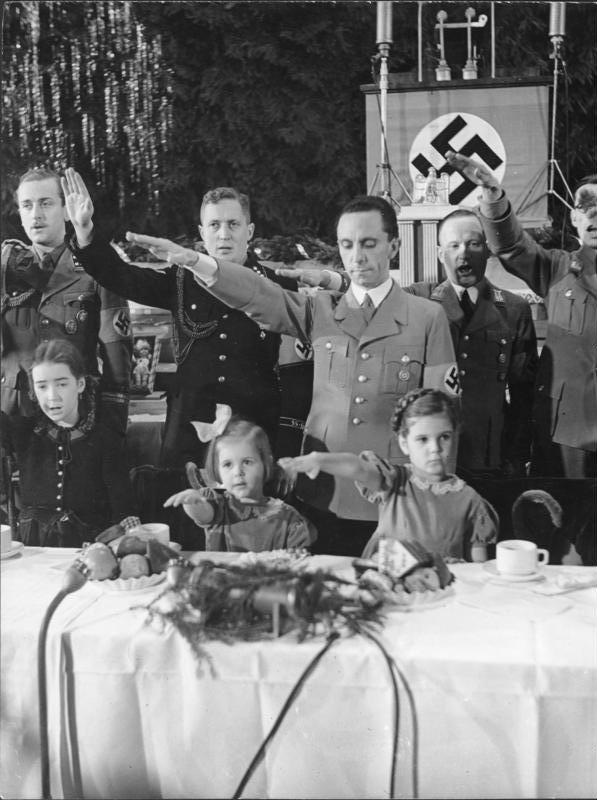
Propaganda Minister Joseph Goebbels with children celebrating Christmas 1937.
Photo: Bundesarchiv
