= Carolyn Price Horton =

American book conservator (1909–2001)

- Born: Carolyn Price; July 13, 1909
- Died: October 21, 2001 (aged 92); Medford, New Jersey, U.S.
- Other name: Carol Price Rugh
- Education: Women's Academy of Applied Art in Vienna
- Occupations: Bookbinder; Conservator-restorer
- Employers: American Philosophical Society; Yale University; Carolyn Horton and Associates
- Notable work: Cleaning and Preserving Bindings and Related Materials (1967); Saving the Libraries of Florence (1967)
- Spouses: 2, including Donald Horton
- Children: 2, Christopher and Lucy

Carolyn Price Horton (July 13, 1909 – October 21, 2001) also known as Carol Price Rugh, was an American bookbinder and conservator-restorer of books. She may have been the first conservator of an American library while working at the American Philosophical Society from 1935 to 1939. She was the first book conservator at Yale University Library and opened her own book restoration business, Carolyn Horton and Associates.

Horton and volunteers known as "Mud Angels" helped museums and libraries in Florence, Italy, to recover books and manuscripts damaged by the 1966 flood of the Arno river. Horton developed novel emergency conservation techniques which she also applied in the 1972 flood of the Corning Glass Museum in Corning, New York.

Horton is considered a pioneer of modern book and paper conservation. Her book Cleaning and Preserving Bindings and Related Materials was first published by the American Library Association in 1967 and republished in 1969. It has been described as "a landmark book describing the proper basic care to conserve books and library materials."

Horton joined the Guild of Bookworkers (GBW) on August 9, 1954, served as the Supply Chairman of the Guild from 1959–1972, and was named a most senior Honorary Member in 1992. She joined the American Institute for Conservation of Historic and Artistic Works (AIC) in the 1970s and was named an Honorary Member of the AIC as of 1982. She retired in 1984.

== Early life and education ==
Carolyn Price first became interested in bookbinding when her high school English teacher in Easton, Pennsylvania recommended she bind a book she had authored. She attended the Women's Academy of Applied Art in Vienna in 1929 to 1930, and studied bookbinding. She apprenticed for five years with Albert Oldach, a German binder and restorer in Philadelphia, Pennsylvania.

== Career ==
=== American Philosophical Society ===
Known as Carol Price Rugh (C.P. Rugh) following her first marriage, she became the first on-site conservator for the American Philosophical Society (APS) in Philadelphia in 1935. She may have been the first conservator of an American library. The collections she worked on included papers from Benjamin Franklin and the College of Physicians of Philadelphia.

She was paid $1 to $1.50 per hour to do bookbinding and restoration. During this time she first began to experiment with the freezing of materials as a way of preventing deterioration. In this way she supported herself and a sister between 1935 and 1939, during the Great Depression.

=== Yale University Library ===
In 1939, she and her second husband, Donald Horton, moved from Philadelphia to New Haven, Connecticut where she become Yale University's first book conservator. She helped to develop conservation techniques such as how to stretch vellum, humidify paper, attach boards, mend pages with paper pulp, and repair bindings using sewing and post binding.

=== Carolyn Horton and Associates ===
Between 1943 and 1958, the Hortons moved to New York (1943), Washington, D.C., Chicago (1947), and back to New York (1958). Her book restoration company, Carolyn Horton and Associates, eventually occupied three of the four floors of her home at 430 West 22nd Street. She trained and worked with both Europeans and Americans, doing book, paper and art conservation for museums, libraries and private collectors. In 1962, she and her staff undertook cleaning of the 37,000 volume collection of the Grolier Club. In 1977, they did conservation work on Vassar College's set of The Birds of America by John James Audubon.

"Based on a solid understanding of materials and techniques, the careful and individualized treatment of items became the hallmark of her work. She often commented that treating an old book was like dancing: you had to follow the lead of your partner."

The records of Carolyn Horton and Associates for 1919-1988 are archived with the Rare Book & Manuscript Library of Columbia University. These include detailed client records of work done, manuscripts, lecture notes, books and papers, including records of the 1966 flood of the Arno in Florence, Italy.

=== 1966 flood of the Arno ===
"Mud angels" recovering damaged books from a library, Florence, 1966

On the night of November 4, 1966, and on into the next day, the Arno river flooded its banks, leaving the Renaissance city of Florence, Italy, its churches, museums and libraries, and its artistic and historical treasures, in up to 22 feet of mud and water. In response to damage caused by the flooding, thousands of volunteers known as the "gli angeli del fango" or "Mud Angels" converged on Florence to help rescue it from the wreckage and mud. Many of them were young people from all over the world. The impromptu response has been described as "an expression of the internationalist instincts, transnational travel and generational solidarity that had developed out of the new-found postwar mobility of the youth of western Europe."

Horton was one of many trained conservators worldwide who responded to the crisis. She made three trips to Florence in connection with the Committee to Rescue Italian Art (CRIA). Her return there was "anxiously requested" by Peter Waters, who was working at the Biblioteca Nazionale Centrale (BNC). She and other American conservators were given the task of helping smaller libraries: fifteen in Florence and one in Venice. Horton would spend years working with them to address the ongoing challenge of preserving their damaged collections.

When Horton arrived in Florence on November 16, 1966, almost two weeks after the flood, the city lacked heat, running water, and electricity. The problem facing her and other conservators was immense. It was also not well understood: there were few established guidelines and little in the research literature about how to deal with such a disaster. Institutions with such experience had rarely shared their experiences or restoration procedures.

Manuscripts from the National Library being washed and dried in the boiler room of the Florence railway station, Florence, 1966

With her knowledge of book conservation techniques, Horton supplied essential expertise to other members of the Mud Angel army. The initial goal was to stabilize the sodden, mud-soaked books and papers before they disintegrated further. Later described as "a practical and pragmatic problem solver", Horton combined her knowledge with an ability to experiment and develop new treatment protocols. She recommended storing books in unheated, well-ventilated rooms to minimize the effects of heat, damp and mold. In Italy and throughout her career, she became known for inventing inexpensive, useful solutions, some named for her: the Horton Humidifier (a double garbage can), a small portable Horton Press, and the Horton Hinge (for re-attaching boards).

=== Establishing standards ===
Horton published a personal account of her experiences in Florence, "Saving the Libraries of Florence" (1967) in the Wilson Library Bulletin. She also published one of the first modern manuals on book repair. Cleaning and Preserving Bindings and Related Materials was first published by the American Library Association in 1967, and republished in 1969. By writing it, Horton helped to "document and standardize book conservation treatments and procedures". Horton's work continues to inform disaster preparedness and crisis response planning and responses to events such as the Prague Library floods in 2002 and Hurricane Katrina in 2005.

=== 1972 Corning Museum of Glass flood ===
External videos
- "Museum Under Water: The Corning Flood of 1972", Corning Museum of Glass, May 15, 2012.

On June 23, 1972, Hurricane Agnes caused the Chemung River to rise until it flooded the streets of Corning, New York. The Corning Museum of Glass including much of its library was submerged in over five feet of water. Following the flood, Horning worked closely with librarian Virginia Wright and museum director Paul Perrot at the Corning Museum of Glass to restore the library's collection. Horton advised library staff on freezing techniques to prevent further deterioration of the books until they could be individually conserved. By August 1, 1972, the Museum was able to reopen (in part) to the public.

Work behind the scenes went on for four more years, until 1976, to painstakingly restore the damaged glass and books from the Museum's collections and library. Carolyn Horton was hired to restore 600 of the Museum's rare books. Treatment of an individual volume, such as Comoediae Novem (1498), could involve freezing, washing away debris, de-acidifying paper to prevent decay, and repair and rebinding of the book's pages. The books Horton worked on have pages with annotations at the back, part of the careful documentation of her work. The Corning Museum retains detailed records documenting her work.

== Personal life ==
Carolyn Price was married twice. She met her second husband Donald Horton at a party for returning veterans of the Abraham Lincoln Brigade hosted by Barrows Dunham whom she met while attending a lecture he gave at Temple University. The two married within a year of meeting each other and had two children.

During the Cold War she led a campaign in Chicago's Belmont Harbor area to prevent the federal government from installing Nike anti-aircraft missiles in the residential area she lived in at the time. After the federal government abandoned the property and removed the missiles the buildings were occupied by the Chicago Indian Village. In her 60s she became an avid hiker and would visit Glacier National Park (U.S.) on a yearly basis.

She retired in 1984, due to failing eyesight caused by macular degeneration, and in 1985 she and her husband moved to the Quaker retirement community of Medford Leas, in Medford, New Jersey. She died there on October 21, 2001 and her body was donated to science.

== Recognition ==
- 1992, Honorary Member, Guild of Bookworkers
- 1982, Honorary Fellow, American Institute for Conservation (AIC)
- After 1984, the Carolyn Horton Scholarship Fund was established by the AIC to support continuing education for book or paper conservators.

== Selected publications ==
- Horton, Carolyn (1967). "Saving the Libraries of Florence". Wilson Library Bulletin. 41: 1036–1045.
- Horton, Carolyn (1967). Cleaning and preserving bindings and related materials. Chicago: Library Technology Program, American Library Association.
