= Aletha C. Huston =

American psychologist

- Education: Stanford University; University of Minnesota
- Occupation: Developmental psychologist

Aletha C. Huston is an American developmental psychologist and professor known for her research on the effects of poverty on children, on how child care and income support policies impact children's development, and for ground-breaking research on the impact of television and media usage on child development. Huston is the Priscilla Pond Flawn Regents Professor Emeritus in Child Development at the University of Texas at Austin.

Huston has received numerous research rewards including the APA Urie Bronfenbrenner Award for Lifetime Contributions to Developmental Psychology, the APA Nicholas Hobbs Award for Research and Child Advocacy, and the SRCD Award for Contributions to Child Development and Public policy. Huston has trained a number of eminent media researchers including Sandra L. Calvert, Rosemarie Truglio, and Ellen Wartella.

== Biography ==
Huston received her BA in psychology at Stanford University in 1960. She received her Ph.D. in the area of Psychology and Child Development at the University of Minnesota. From 1961 to 1965, she did her predoctoral fellowship with the National Institute of Mental Health. Since then, she has worked at a number of universities. From 1963 to 1964, she worked as an intern at the University of Minnesota Children's Hospital. From 1965 to 1968, she joined the Cornell University faculty as an assistant professor. From 1968 to 1976, she was a member of the Pennsylvania State University faculty where she helped to found the Women's Studies Program. Soon after, she joined the University of Kansas faculty as a professor in the Departments of Human Development & Family Life and Psychology. There, she was also co-director of the Center for Research on the Influence of Television on Children beginning after 1978. From 1973 to 1974, she worked as a visiting associate professor at Temple University.

Huston has also been a member of numerous organizations including the American Psychological Association (APA), the Society for Research in Child Development, the Southwestern Society for Research in Human Development, the International Communications Association, Public Policy Association, and the Society for the Psychological Study of Research Issues. Additionally, she has served on multiple advisory boards, for example, for the Hallmark Child Development Project and the National Research Council of the National Academy of Sciences. In 1976, she was named a Fellow of the APA.

Huston has served as President of Division 7 (Developmental Psychology) of the American Psychological Association and as President of the Society for Research in Child Development. She has spent her career researching child development and the effects of media, gender role development, child-care consequences and the mechanisms of poverty on it.

== Research ==
Huston's research addresses how poverty affects children and their development. She is a Principal Investigator in the New Hope Project, a study that focuses on the outcome of a work-based program that aims to reduce poverty. Huston is also a collaborator in the Next Generation Project, where child-care, income, and employment policies are investigated. She served as an investigator in the NICHD Study of Early Child Care and Youth Development and she conducted a program of research on television and children, co-directing the Center for Research on the Influences of Television on Children (CRITC).

== Accolades ==
Huston has received many awards over the duration of her career. In 1988, she received the Irvin Youngberg Award for Outstanding Achievement in Applied Sciences at the University of Kansas. In 1990, she received the Special Recognition Award for Service to the Field from the American Alliance for Theater and Education.
