= Sandra L. Calvert =

American psychologist

Sandra Calvert
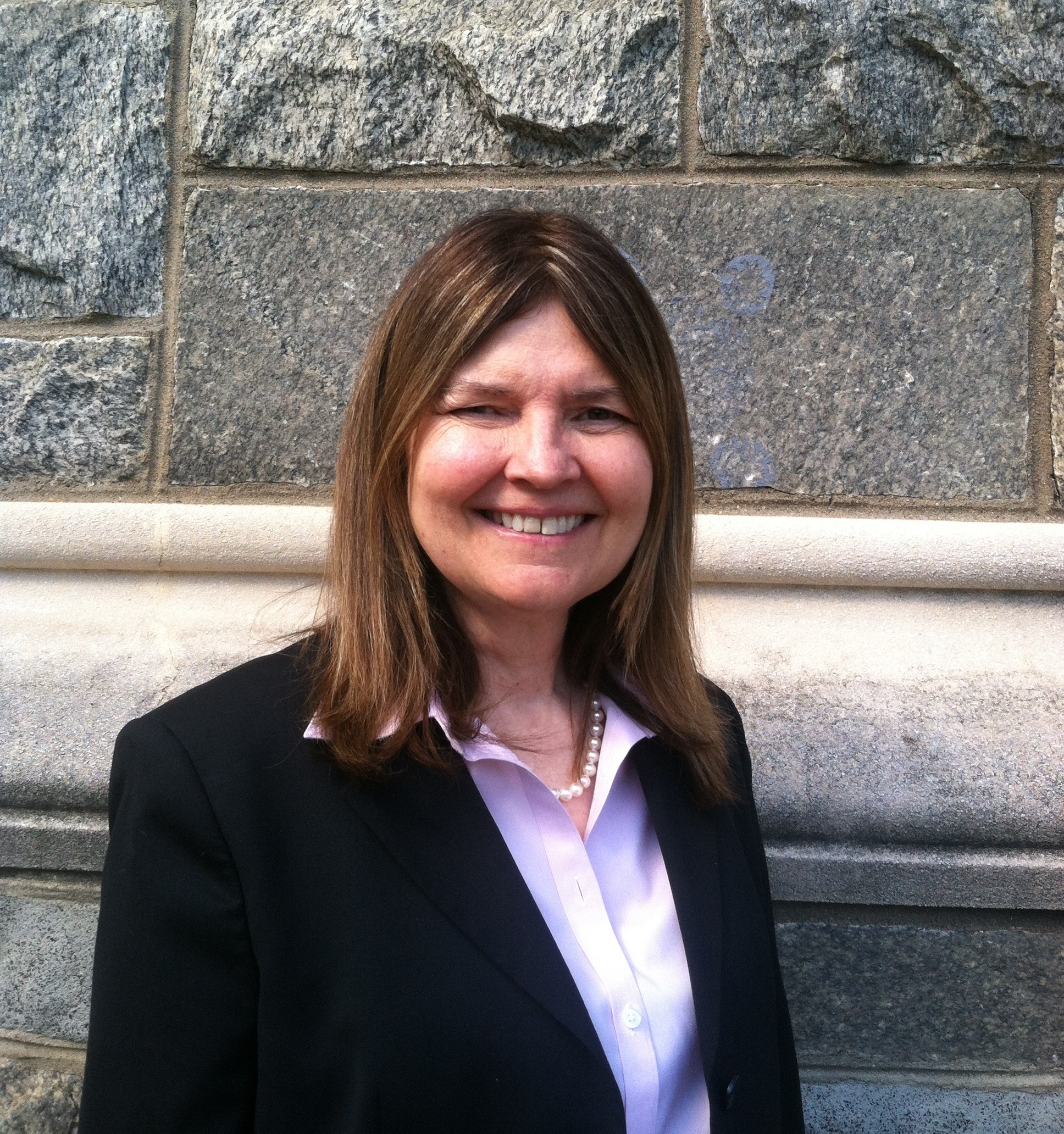
- Sandra Calvert in 2014
- Born: West Virginia, United States
- Education: West Virginia University; Pennsylvania State University; University of Kansas
- Scientific career
- Fields: Psychology
- Workplaces: Georgetown University

Sandra L. Calvert is a developmental and child psychologist, whose scholarship illuminates the children's media area, including policy implications. Calvert is currently professor of psychology, and an affiliated faculty member at the McCourt School of Public Policy at Georgetown University. Calvert is also the co-founder and Director of the Children's Digital Media Center, a multi-university research initiative funded primarily by multiple grants from the National Science Foundation, as well as by private foundations. Calvert served as chair of the department of psychology at Georgetown University from 2006 to 2009.

== Education and early career ==
Calvert received her B.A. degree with a major in psychology and a minor in sociology from West Virginia University, an MA degree in human development and family studies from the Pennsylvania State University, and her Ph.D. in developmental and child psychology from the University of Kansas. Her mentor for her doctoral degree was Aletha C. Huston, Ph.D. Prior to coming to Georgetown University, she served on the faculty in child development and family relations at the University of North Carolina-Greensboro.

== Research ==
Calvert's research spans the fields of child psychology, communications, child development, health, medicine, and social policy. She and her colleagues have been awarded more than $9.25 million in external funding to conduct research on children's media, including multiple collaborative grants from the National Science Foundation, the first of which was used to create the Children's Digital Media Center (CDMC). She has also received funding from private foundations, such as the Stuart Family Foundation, the Smith Richardson Foundation, and the Robert Wood Johnson Foundation.

Overall, Calvert has published seven books, more than 80 peer-reviewed journal articles, and more than 30 book chapters. She has also given more than 250 invited papers and refereed presentations at professional conferences and meetings. Calvert's research addresses seminal questions such as how learning from observational media interfaces like television and film are similar or different from more interactive media such as computers and tablets. Her research has covered numerous content areas and media interfaces with children ranging in age from infancy through emerging adulthood. These topics include children's comprehension of media content, particularly of educational and prosocial content, and their parasocial interaction with media characters; the influence of gender roles in the media; the impact of video games on childhood aggression; the impact of marketing, including the role of media characters, and exergaming (video games that require movement) on childhood obesity; the role of media characters in mathematical skill learning; very early learning from media; and the role of production features (e.g., action, sound effects, dialogue) as representational tools to help children think about and understand content. As media platforms have evolved and changed, she has grown with the times, examining diverse kinds of interfaces ranging from stories presented in television and film to computer, video, and virtual reality games, to apps on tablets and math games taught by intelligent agents.

== Policy ==
Calvert has served on numerous advisory committees and made numerous media presentations to improve the quality of children's media, including a series of lectures for the U.S. State Department about creating quality educational media, which was hosted by the U.S. embassy in Macedonia. In the educational media area, she presented testimony before the Senate Committee on Commerce, Science, and Transportation about the impact and future of the Children's Television Act, which requires broadcasters to provide educational and informational programming for children. She also served on two committees for the National Academies, one on youth, pornography, and the Internet, and the second on the role of food marketing in the pediatric obesity crisis, as well as on an American Psychological Task Force to examine the impact of violent video games on youth aggression.

== Awards and honors ==
- American Psychological Association Fellow
- International Communication Association Fellow
- Erskine Fellow, University of Canterbury New Zealand
- National Research Council (United States) Associate Award
- Outstanding Young Women of America
- Phi Beta Kappa
- Psi Chi Honorary

== Recent representative publications ==
- Calvert, S.L.; Wilson, B.J. (2008). The handbook of children, media and development. Boston, MA: Wiley-Blackwell. ISBN 978-1444336948.
- Institute of Medicine (2005). Food Marketing to Children and Youth: Threat or Opportunity?. The National Academies Press. ISBN 978-0-309-09713-0.
- Thornburg, D.; Lin, H.S., eds. (2002). Youth, pornography, and the Internet. National Academy Press. doi:10.17226/10261. ISBN 978-0-309-08274-7.
- Calvert, Sandra (2015). "Children and Digital Media". In Lerner, R. (ed.). Handbook of Child Psychology and Developmental Science, Ecological Settings and Processes in Developmental Systems (7th ed.). Hoboken, N.J.: Wiley. pp. 375–415. ISBN 978-1-118-13685-0.
- Calvert, S.L.; Appelbaum, M.I.; Dodge, K.A.; Graham, S.; Hall, G.C.N.; Hamby, S.L.; Fasig-Caldwell, L.; Citkovitz, M.; Galloway, D.P.; Hodges, L.V. (2017). "The American Psychological Association Task Force assessment of violent videogames: Science in the service of public interest". American Psychologist. 72 (2): 126–143. doi:10.1037/a0040413. PMID 28221065. S2CID 25565229.
- Calvert, S.L.; Richards, M.N.; Kent, C. (2014). "Personalized interactive characters for toddlers' learning of seriation from a video presentation". Journal of Applied Developmental Psychology. 35 (3): 148–155. doi:10.1016/j.appdev.2014.03.004.
- Staiano, A.E.; Abrahman, A.; Calvert, S.L. (2013). "Adolescent exergame play for weight loss and psychosocial improvement: A controlled physical activity intervention". Obesity. 21 (3): 598–601. doi:10.1002/oby.20282. PMC 3473097. PMID 23592669.
- Staiano, A.E.; Abraham, A.; Calvert, S.L. (2012). "Competitive versus cooperative exergame play for African American adolescents' executive functioning skills". Developmental Psychology. 48 (2): 337–342. doi:10.1037/a0026938. PMC 4097099. PMID 22369339.
- Pempek, T.; Yermolayeva, Y.; Calvert, S.L. (2009). "College students social networking experiences on Facebook". Journal of Applied Developmental Psychology. 30 (3): 227–238. doi:10.1016/j.appdev.2008.12.010. S2CID 18165760.
- Pempek, T.; Calvert, S.L. (2009). "Tipping the Balance: Use of advergames to promote consumption of nutritious foods and beverages by low-income African American children" (PDF). Archives of Pediatrics and Adolescent Medicine. 163 (7): 633–637. doi:10.1001/archpediatrics.2009.71. PMID 19581546.
- Calvert, S.L. (2008). "Growing consumers: Media marketing and advertising" (PDF). The Future of Children. doi:10.1353/foc.0.0001.
- Calvert, S.L.; Strong, B.L.; Jacobs, E.L.; Conger, E.E. (2007). "Interaction and participation for young Hispanic and Caucasian children's learning of media content". Media Psychology. 9 (2): 431–445. doi:10.1080/15213260701291379. S2CID 18864163.
- Calvert, S.L.; Kotler, J.A. (2003). "Lessons from children's television: Impact of the Children's Television Act on Children's Learning". Journal of Applied Developmental Psychology. 24 (3): 275–335. doi:10.1016/S0193-3973(03)00060-1.
- Calvert, S.L.; Mahler, B.A.; Zehnder, S.M.; Jenkins, A.; Lee, M. (2003). "Gender differences in preadolescent children's online interactions: Symbolic modes of self-presentation and self-expression". Journal of Applied Developmental Psychology. 24 (6): 627–644. doi:10.1016/j.appdev.2003.09.001.
