= Audience capture =

Online influencer phenomenon

Audience capture is the phenomenon where an influencer is affected by their audience, catering to it with what they believe it wants to hear or is willing to pay for. This creates a positive feedback loop, which can lead the influencer to express more extreme views and behaviors. The effect can cause ideological media creators to become more politically radical based on feedback from their audience.

== Examples ==
Online influencer Nicholas Perry, known as Nikocado Avocado, started off on YouTube with videos of himself playing the violin and supporting veganism. He then shifted to videos of himself eating known as mukbang. Audience capture led him to more and more extreme eating, resulting in obesity and poor health.

== See also ==
- Michelangelo phenomenon
- Parasocial interaction
- Political base
- Cancel culture
- Radicalization
