= Parasocial interaction =

Type of psychological relationship

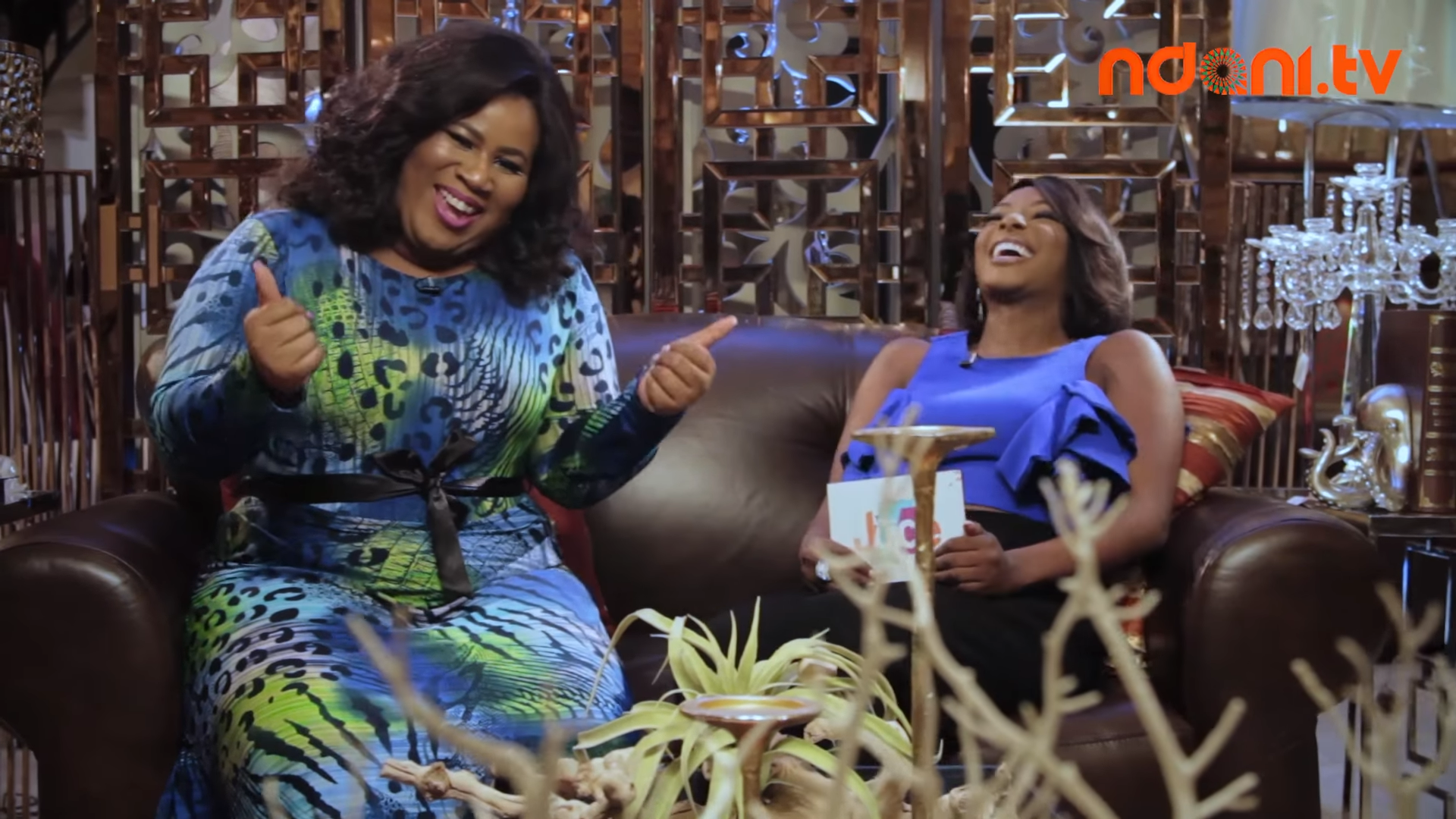
Nigerian comedian Chigul (left) giving a reaction to the camera in a NDaniTV interview. Personalities seen regularly through mass media may be perceived with a sense of closeness by the viewer.

Parasocial interaction (PSI) refers to a kind of psychological relationship experienced by an audience in their mediated encounters with performers in mass media. PSI is described as an illusory experience, such that media audiences interact with personas (e.g., talk show hosts, celebrities, fictional characters, social media influencers, AI chatbots) as if they are engaged in a reciprocal relationship with them. The term was coined by Donald Horton and Richard Wohl in 1956.

Parasocial interaction can happen through many kinds of media, including TV shows, podcasts, livestreams and social platforms where creators speak directly to viewers. The term first became widely used when researchers tried to explain why TV and radio personalities could feel familiar to audiences. Now it is used far beyond those formats. Social media and live-streaming make the feeling easier to sustain, since people get constant updates and a more casual tone. As a result, the connection can develop across time and influence how audiences react to public figures. Due to readily available media resources and the amount of time spent on media resources, children and teens are easily subjected to developing parasocial relationships at a young age. Studies involving longitudinal effects of parasocial interactions on children are still relatively new, according to developmental psychologist Sandra L. Calvert.

A parasocial interaction can also be brought by repeated exposure to the media persona. Positive information learned about the media persona results in increased attraction due to trust and self-disclosure provided by the media persona, and the relationship progresses. Media users are loyal and feel directly connected to the persona, much as they are connected to their close friends, by observing and interpreting their appearance, gestures, voice, conversation, and conduct. Media personas have a significant amount of influence over media users, positive or negative, informing the way that they perceive certain topics or even their purchasing habits.

While not universal to all parasocial interaction, a strong component of PSI are fantasies in which an individual develops ideas of romantic and sexual intimacy with a media persona despite not being in any reciprocal relationship with them. Such romantic and sexual fantasies with media personas can have varied effects, including both negative and positive.

== Evolution of the term ==
Parasocial interaction was first described from the perspective of media and communication studies. In 1956, Horton and Wohl explored the different interactions between mass media users and media figures and determined the existence of a parasocial relationship (PSR), where the user acts as though they are involved in a typical social relationship. However, parasocial interaction existed before mass media, when a person would establish a bond with political figures, gods or even spirits.

Since then, the term has been adopted by psychologists in furthering their studies of the social relationships that emerge between consumers of mass media and the figures they see represented there. Horton and Wohl suggested that for most people, parasocial interactions with personae complement their current social interactions, while also suggesting that there are some individuals who exhibit extreme parasociality, or they substitute parasocial interactions for actual social interactions. Perse and Rubin (1989) contested this view, finding that parasocial interactions occurred as a natural byproduct of time spent with media figures.

Although the concept originated from a psychological topic, extensive research of PSI has been performed in the area of mass communication with manifold results. Psychologists began to show their interest in the concept in the 1980s, and researchers began to develop the concept extensively within the field of communication science. Many important questions about social psychology were raised concerning the nature of these relationships that are problematic for existing theories in those fields. The concept of parasocial interaction and detailed examination of the behavioral phenomena that it seeks to explain have considerable potential for developing psychological theory.

The conceptual development of parasocial interaction (PSI) and parasocial relationship (PSR) are interpreted and employed in different ways in various literatures. When it is applied in the use-and-gratifications (U&G) approaches, the two concepts are typically treated interchangeably, with regard primarily to a special type of "interpersonal involvement" with media figures that includes different phenomena such as interaction and identification. In contrast to the U&G approaches, research domains such as media psychology and semiotics argue for a clear distinction between the terms.

PSI specifically means the "one-sided process of media person perception during media exposure", whereas PSR stands for "a cross-situational relationship that a viewer or user holds to a media person, which includes specific cognitive and affective components". Schmid & Klimmt (2011) further argue that PSI and PSR are progressive states such that what begins as a PSI has the potential to become a PSR. Dibble, Hartmann and Rosaen (2016) suggest that a PSR can develop without a PSI occurring, such as when the characters do not make a direct connection with the viewer.

In sum, the terms, definitions, and models explicating PSI and PSR differ across scientific backgrounds and traditions. For example, Dibble et al. (2016) argued that PSI and PSR are often "conflated conceptually and methodologically". To test their assertion, they tested for parasocial indicators with two different scales used for parasocial inquiry: the traditional PSI-Scale and the newer EPSI-Scale, and compared results between the two.

The traditional PSI-Scale, along with modified forms of it, is the most widely used measure of PSI assessment. However, Dibble et al. (2016) found evidence supporting their hypothesis that the newer EPSI-Scale was a better measure of PSIs and that the traditional scale merely revealed participants' liking of characters. Because of varying conceptions, it is difficult for researchers to reach a consensus.

== Scientific research ==
Studying social interaction, and by extension parasocial interaction (PSI), follows a social cognitive approach to defining individual cognitive activity. Accordingly, there are similar psychological processes at work in both parasocial relationships and face-to-face interactions. However, the parasocial relationship does not follow the process of the typical long-term relationship. The media user remains a stranger to the media figure, whereas this "strangeness" would gradually evaporate in typical social interaction.

Many parasocial relationships fulfill the needs of typical social interaction, but potentially reward insecurity. Many who possess a dismissive attachment style to others may find the one-sided interaction to be preferable in lieu of dealing with others, while those who experience social anxiety from typical interactions may find comfort in the lives of celebrities consistently being present. Additionally, whatever a celebrity or online figure may do can provoke emotional responses from their audiences—some even going as far as suffering from negative feelings because of it.

The research of PSI obtained significant interest after the advent of the uses and gratifications approach to mass communication research in the early 1970s. A study of early soap opera identified two essential functions of PSI: companionship and personal identity. Rosengren and Windahl further argued that PSI could be identified in the process of viewers' interacting with media figures, but such interaction did not produce identification. This is an important distinction, because identification has a longer history than PSI. Subsequent research has indicated that PSI is evident when identification is not present.

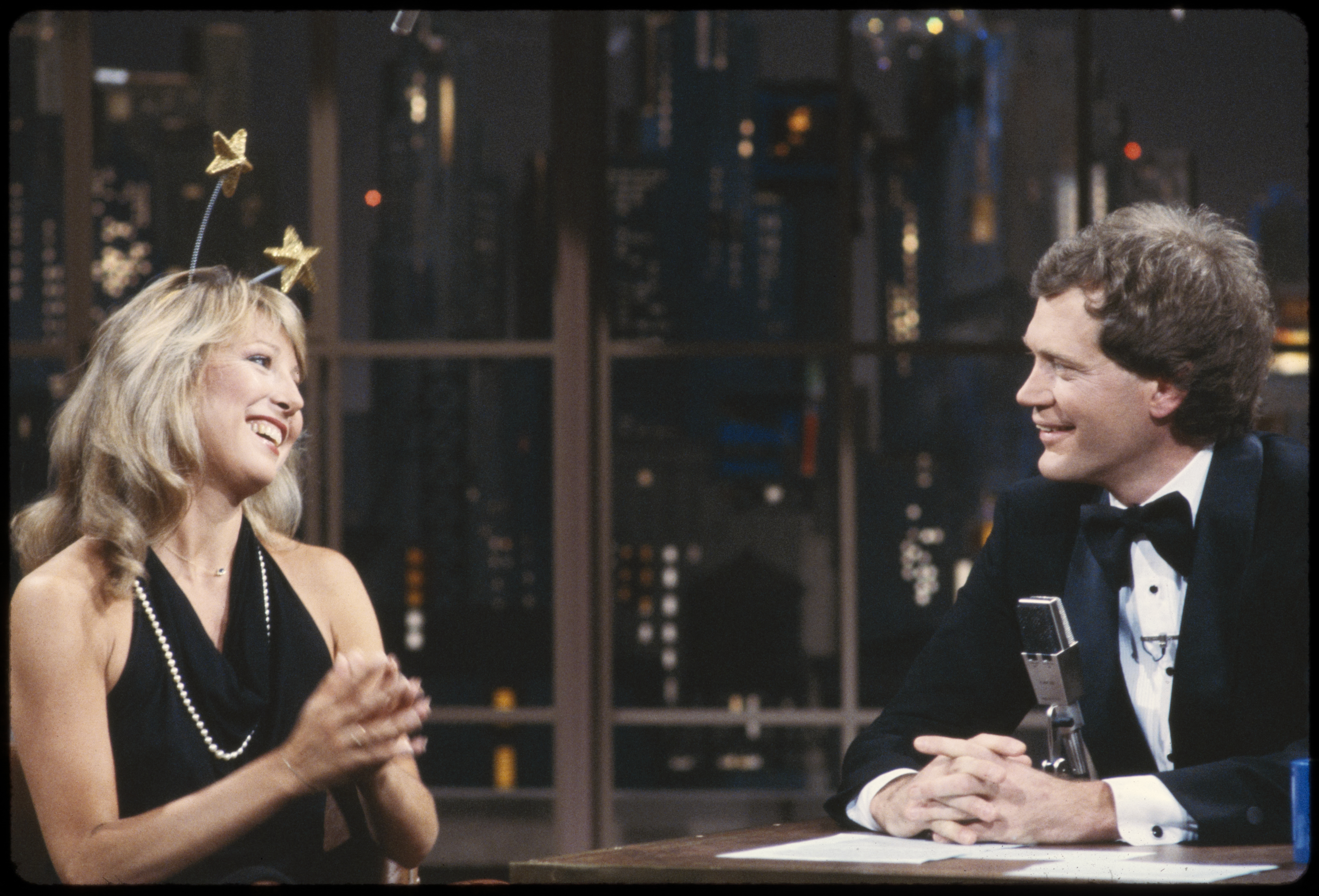
David Letterman interviewing Teri Garr on Late Night with David Letterman in 1982. Television viewers may develop parasocial relationships with celebrities or presenters seen on television.

During the last several decades, PSI has been documented in the research analyzing the relationship between audience members and television newscasters, TV and radio talk-show hosts, sitcom characters and other TV celebrities or performers. Research has also been conducted on how a favorable PSI can be facilitated between celebrities and their followers on social media, specifically through the interactions followers have with the celebrities' posts on social media. Although different PSI scales have been employed in these studies, PSI was clearly documented with each persona.

Noticing the importance of media in the area of psychological research, academic David Giles asserted in his 2002 paper that there is a need for PSI research to move away from the field of mass communication and into the field of psychology. Studies in this area are commonly conducted by focusing a key psychological issue for PSI: concerning the similarity between parasocial relations and ordinary social relations. For example, academic John Turner adopted the idea of homophily (i.e., the tendency for friendships to form between people that are alike in some designated respect) to examine the interpersonal and psychological predictors of parasocial interaction with television performers. The author found that one dimension of homophily (i.e., attitude) was the best predictor of parasocial interaction.

Hataway indicated that although there seems to be prevailing to analyze PSI in the domain of social psychology, a solid connection to psychological theory and developmental theory has been missing. Hataway further suggested that more psychological research is needed in order to develop parasocial theory. Specific issues cited were "how parasocial relationships are derived from parasocial interaction and the way those relationships further influence media usage as well as a social construction of reality, and how parasocial interaction is cognitively produced". He saw that the majority of PSI research has been conducted by mass communication scholars as a weakness and called for psychologists to refer to Giles's 2002 paper for directions of studies.

Another important consideration for the study of PSI at a psychological level is that there is a form of PSI existing even in interpersonal social situations. People may use fundamentally the same cognitive processes in both interpersonal and mediated communication. Giles's 2002 paper also suggested that the element of direct interaction occurred in mediated interaction, such as talking to a presenter or celebrity guest, may continue in social interaction, with a cartoon character or a fictional protagonist in the mind. This may finally constitute a new way of interpreting social interaction. A further consideration is application of social cognitive approaches in individual levels. It is traditionally accepted that this approach is inadequate by itself for the study of relationships.

However, a growing literature on the role of imagination in social interaction suggests that some imaginative activity (e.g., imaginary friends) may be an influential factor in the outcome of real social interaction. PSI is currently regarded as an extension of normal social cognition, specifically in terms of the use of the imagination. Current PSI literature commonly acknowledge that the psychological processes acting at the individual level parallel those used in ordinary social activity and relationship building.

== Psychological implications during childhood ==
The formation of parasocial relationships occurs frequently among adolescents, often creating one-sided and unreciprocated bonds with celebrities they encounter in the media. Parasocial interaction is best explored across a lifespan, which explains the growing focus on parasocial interaction in children and adolescents. Studies conducted have found differences between young girls and boys and how each group engages in parasocial behavior. Adolescent boys have the tendency to favor male athletes, as opposed to adolescent girls who preferred celebrities such as musicians or actresses.

Sex-role stereotyping is more common in children ages 5–6, but decreases in children age 10–11. Existing literature intimates that attachments, parasocial or otherwise, established in early childhood, are highly influential on relationships created later in life. Many studies have focused on adolescent girls because they are more likely to form a strong bond with a media figure and be influenced in terms of lifestyle choices.

=== Positive consequences ===
==== Identity formation ====
The primary effect is that of learning: consistent with Bandura's (1986) social cognitive theory, much evidence shows that children learn from positive and negative televised role models and acquire norms and standards for conduct through media outlets such as television and video games. This is supported by a study by Cynthia Hoffner with children aged 7–12, which showed that the gender of children's favorite televised characters was strongly correlated to the gender of the children. The research showed "wishful identification" with parasocial relationships, namely, that boys preferred intelligence, while girls preferred attractiveness when picking favorite characters. This particular gender correlation between children and their preferred role models is both enhanced and mitigated by their separation from reality.

The lack of actual contact with these idealized figures can offer positive social interactions without risk of rejection or consequent feelings of unworthiness. One cannot know everything about a media figure or icon, allowing adolescents to attach fantasized attributes onto these figures in order to meet their own specific wants or needs. On the other hand, entities far removed from reality tend to be less influential on children.

A study by Rosaen and Dibble examined correlation between realism of favorite television character and strength of parasocial relationships. Results showed a positive correlation between social realism (how realistic the character is) and strength of parasocial relationships. Results also show age-related differences among children. Older children tended to prefer more realistic characters, while younger children generally had more powerful parasocial relationships with any character. Age did not impact the correlation between social realism and strength of parasocial interaction, which suggests that more real characters are grounds for more powerful parasocial relationships in children of all ages.

==== Learning through the media ====
Parasocial relationships may be formed during an individual's early childhood. In particular, toddlers have a tendency to form parasocial connections with characters that they are exposed to from TV shows and film. Children's television shows, such as Dora the Explorer, involve the show's characters directly addressing the audience. The result is young children participating in "pseudo-conversations" with the on-screen characters. The process of engagement and interaction leads children to creating a one-sided bond where they believe that they have formed a relationship with these fictional characters, viewing them as friends. Exposure to this type of media often leads to opportunities for educating the child. Research has shown that children are more capable of grasping a concept if a character that they are parasocially connected to is the one to present it to them.

The ability to learn from parasocial relationships is directly correlated to the strength of the relationship, as has been shown in work by Sandra L. Calvert and colleagues. In a 2011 study by Lauricella, Gola, and Calvert, eight 21-month-old American infants were taught seriation sequencing (placing objects in the correct order—in this study, nesting a set of cups of various sizes) by one of two characters. One character, Elmo, is iconic in American culture and therefore socially meaningful, and the other, DoDo, although popular with children in Taiwan, is less well known in American media. Children were better able to learn from the socially meaningful character (Elmo) than from the character who was less easily recognized (DoDo).

Children could become better able to learn from less socially-relevant characters such as DoDo, by developing a parasocial relationship with that character. Accordingly, after children were given DoDo toys to play with, their ability to learn from that character increased. In a later study, this effect was found to be greatest when children showed stronger parasocial relationships: Children's success on the seriation task, and therefore their ability to learn from a less familiar character, was greatest for children who exhibited more emotional nurturing behaviors toward the DoDo toy during play.

Personalization of a character makes a child more likely to nurture the character, and thus more likely to form a parasocial relationship that would improve learning from videos featuring the character. In place of DoDo and Elmo, a 2014 study instead gave children My Pal Scout and My Pal Violet dolls, which are programmable toys sold by LeapFrog Enterprises. These interactive plush toy dogs can be programmed to say a child's name and have particular favorites (i.e., a favorite food, color, and song). 18-month-old children were given either personalized toys (matched for gender, programmed to say the child's name, and programmed to have the same favorites as the child) or non-personalized toys (the opposite gender, programmed to call the children "Pal" and have random favorites).

At the end of the study, children who had received personalized dolls were better able to learn from their characters than were children who had received non-personalized toys. Children also nurtured personalized toys more than non-personalized toys. It seems that perceived similarities increase children's interest and investment in the characters, which motivates the development of parasocial relationships and helps improve later screen-based learning.

=== Negative consequences ===
In the past two decades, people have become increasingly interested in the potential negative impacts media has on people's behavior and cognition. Many researchers have begun to look more closely at how people's relationships with various media outlets affect behavior, self-perception and attachment styles, and specifically in regards to creating parasocial relationships.

==== Body image ====
Further research has examined these relationships with regard to body image and self-perception. Interest in this more narrow area of research has increased as body image issues have become more prevalent in today's society.

A study was conducted to examine the relationship between media exposure and adolescents' body image. Specifically, researchers looked at parasocial relationships and the different motivations for self-comparison with a character. This study surveyed 391 7th and 8th grade students and found that media exposure negatively predicted body image. In addition to the direct negative impact, the study indicated that parasocial relationships with favorite characters, motivations to self-compare, and engagement in social comparison with characters amplified the negative effects on kids' body images. Furthermore, the researchers found that making social comparisons with favorite characters distorted actual, or ideal, body image and self-perception. Studies have been done exploring these effects of negative self-perception and body image across both male and female students.

A study examined the parasocial relationships between men and superheroes; the study looked at muscular versus non-muscular superheroes and men who either did or did not develop a one-sided psychological bond with a superhero character. The results from this study indicated a significant impact on body image, particularly when exposed to muscular superhero characters. Research conducted by Ariana F. Young, Shira Gabriel, and Jordan L. Hollar in 2013 showed that men who did not form a parasocial relationship with a muscular superhero had poor self-perception and felt negative about their bodies after exposure to the muscular character. However, if the men had a PSR with the superhero, the negative effects on body satisfaction were eliminated.

The increasing presence of beauty filters on social media has also played a large role in users' body image. On Facebook, within the first-year filters were available, over 400,000 creators released and utilized over 1.2 million filters. These filters were consistently seen by billions of viewers, as more than 150 creators surpassed 1 billion views on their content. These filters edit the appearance of the creator which can give a false reality to viewers.

==== Unrealistic life expectations ====
There is research that has been done that highlights the negative role that parasocial relationships play in a person's own self esteem about their personal life. Oftentimes, a person forms a parasocial relationship with a celebrity or influencer because of their personality and the seemingly appealing life that the person lives. Studies show that depression and a decrease in self-esteem can often occur in these relationships due to the person comparing their own life to the potentially unrealistic portrayal of the celebrity's life. It is easy to look at a celebrity who travels on private jets, takes expensive trips, and lives in a mansion and think that their life is perfect. However, most celebrities and influencers hide the negative aspects of their life from public view. This may result in some people feeling their life is boring or insufficient because of a celebrity or influencer's potentially misleading online portrayal.

==== Aggression ====
Further studies have looked into parasocial relationships and more specifically at the impacts on violent and aggressive behavior. A study done by Keren Eyal and Alan M. Rubin examined aggressive and violent television characters and the potential negative impacts they may have on viewers. The study was based on social cognitive theory and looked at trait aggression in viewers and identification and parasocial interaction with aggressive characters. The researchers measured trait aggression in each of the participants and compared that to the level of identification with aggressive characters. The study found that more aggressive viewers were more likely to identify with aggressive characters and further develop parasocial relationships with the aggressive characters.

Parasocial interaction has been linked to psychological attachment theory and its consequences have seen the same dramatic effects as real relationship breakups. In considering the relationship between parasocial interaction and attachment styles, Jonathan Cohen found that individuals who were more attached to certain television and media programs tended to be more invested in parasocial relationships. These parasocial interactions use similar psychological thought processes that are often used in real-life personal relationships.

In parasocial interaction there is no "normal" social interaction; it is a very one-sided relationship. The knowledgeable side has no direct control over the actions of the side it observes, and it is very difficult for it to contact and influence it.

=== Identification and mental health ===
Parasocial relationships may have negative impact to one's mental health. Identifying such one-sided relationships involves open conversations acknowledging the normality of interpersonal relationships, that attachments are normal, and when it became unhealthy, offer alternatives that can re-route one's attachment to something more positive.

== On the internet ==
In 1998, John Eighmey, from Iowa State University, and Lola McCord, from the University of Alabama, published a study titled "Adding Value in the Information Age: Uses and Gratifications of Sites on the World Wide Web." In the study, they observed that the presence of parasocial relationships constituted an important determinant of website visitation rates. "It appears," the study states, "that websites projecting a strong sense of personality may also encourage the development of a kind of parasocial relationship with website visitors".

In 1999, John Hoerner, from the University of Alabama, published a study titled "Scaling the Web: A Parasocial Interaction Scale for World Wide Web Sites", in which he proposed a method for measuring the effects of parasocial interaction on the Internet. The study explained that websites may feature "personae" that host to the visitors to the sites in order to generate public interest.

Personae, in some cases, are nothing more than the online representations of the actual people, often prominent public figures, but sometimes, according to the study, will be the fictional creations of the sites' webmasters. Personae "take on many of the characteristics of a [real-life] companion, including regular and frequent appearances, a sense of immediacy...and the feeling of a face-to-face meeting." The study makes the point that, even when no such personae have been created, parasocial relationships might still develop. Webmasters might foster parasocial interactions through a conversational writing style, extensive character development and opportunities for email exchange with the website's persona.

Hoerner used the Parasocial Interaction (PSI) scale, developed by Rubin, Perse, and Powell in 1985, and modified the scale to more accurately assess parasocial interactions on the Internet. They used the scale to gauge participants' reactions to a number of different websites, and, more generally, to determine whether or not parasocial interaction theory could be linked to Internet use. The study concluded, first, that parasocial interaction is not dependent on the presence of a traditional persona on a website. Data showed that websites with described "strong personae" did not attract significantly more hits than other websites selected by the study conductors. "The literal, mediated personality from the newscast or soap opera of the past [around which the original PSI-scale was framed] is gone. The design metaphor, flow of the web experience, and styles of textual and graphic presentations of the information all become elements of a website persona and encourage parasocial interaction by the visitor/user with that persona."

Algorithm-driven content on digital platforms further enhances compulsive consumption patterns in users. Current tactics have evolved from basic demographic targeting to advanced predictive personalization, especially with the advent of Artificial Intelligence (AI). Analytics investigates online behaviors, including content preferences or website visiting, to characterize users and develop custom-tailored personas that can engage millions of people simultaneously. Personalized messages created by AI have been found to have a significantly greater influence compared to non-personalized messages.

The bonding is also formed faster by algorithmic systems that simulate intimacy and authenticity, which ultimately replace social bonds. Automated parasociality offers its users a customized, ever-present, and non-judgmental companionship. The personalized information is intended to foster an deeper sense of closeness and trust with online personalities. This dynamic drives the concern among academic researchers that AI will be able to persuade people more effectively than human beings.

=== Social media ===
On social media, parasocial interaction can be easier to develop and maintain because audiences can follow a creators's daily updates and communicate through features like comments, likes, and livestream chats. This constant visibility can make a creator feel familiar and accessible, even though the relationship remains one sided. Platforms also encourage direct address, where creators speak to viewers in a conversational tone or share personal moments, which can strengthen the sense of closeness over time. While many parasocial ties stay casual, they can still shape how people interpret a creator's personality and intensions, especially when audiences feel they "know" the person behind the content.

Though most literature has focused on parasocial interaction as a television and film phenomenon, new technologies, namely the Internet, have necessitated a closer look at such interactions. The applications of PSI to computer-mediated environments are continuously documented in literature from the early 2000s and 2010s. Many researchers concluded that, just as parasocial relationships are present in television and radio, they are also present in online environments such as blogs and other social networking sites. Through an exploration of followers on politicians' blogs, academics Kjerstin Thorson and Shelly Rodgers found that parasocial interacting with the politician influences people's opinions about the politician, and promotes them to vote for the politician.

Social media is designed to be a new channel through which parasocial interaction/relationship can be formed. Research has shown that interacting with individuals through blogs and social media such as Twitter can influence the perceptions of those individuals. As Internet users become more active on social media platforms such as Facebook and Twitter, followers often feel more engaged with them, making the parasocial relationships stronger.

Social media is defined as "Internet-based applications that build on the ideological and technological foundations of Web 2.0 and that allow the creation and exchange of user-generated content". While the usage of social media for personal means is common, the use of social media by celebrities has given them an opportunity to have a larger platform for personal causes or brand promotion by facilitating word-of-mouth.

Social media networks inherit at least one key attribute from the Internet, in that they offer open accessibility for all users. Philip Drake and Andy Miah argue that the Internet, and therefore social networks and blogs, downsize the gatekeeping processes that exist in other mass media forms. They further state that this means that online information can spread unfiltered and thus does not rest on strict framework conditions such as those on television or in newspapers. This, however, remains subject to an ongoing debate within research.

Through presence on social media platforms, stars and celebrities attempt on the one hand to participate in the production of their image; on the other hand, they must remain present in these media in order to stay on the media's and consequently on the audience's agenda. According to German scholars such as Gregor Daschmann and Holger Schramm, celebrities all have to compete for the public's (limited) attention. In such a competitive environment a famous person must therefore remain present on all accessible media channels.

=== Effects and concerns ===
Parasocial interaction can influence how audiences relate to a creator or public figure. In many cases, the relationship remains casual, but stronger attachment can lead to expectations for replies, access or personal attention. When those expectations are not met, people may feel disappointed or frustrated, and the situation can turn into boundary issues or conflict online. The impact also depends on context, including the platform and how interactive the creator's content is. Research has discussed both potential benefits, such as enjoyment or a sense of connection, and potential downsides, such as unmet expectations and boundary conflicts. Strong parasocial ties can occasionally affect attitudes, consumer behavior, and decision-making. For instance, viewers might follow the advice of media personalities or embrace their viewpoints. Excessive parasocial attachment, however, can also lead to emotional pain, irrational expectations, or trouble telling the difference between mediated and authentic social relationships. The advantages and disadvantages of parasocial interaction in contemporary media environments are still being studied by researchers.

==== TikTok ====
TikTok is a social media platform that allows its creators to create, share, and post short videos. It was created by a Chinese Company ByteDance in 2016 to inspire creativity to a global community. This platform is very popular with it personalized algorithm. Due to the amount of time spent viewing posts and livestreams on TikTok, parasocial relationships can be easily formed because of having the live connection of face-to-face on camera. This experience creates an intimate and somewhat friendship in the viewer's eyes.

==== Twitter ====
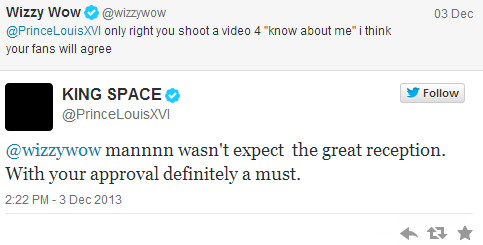
Musician Wizzy Wow communicating in public on Twitter

Twitter is one of the most popular social media platforms and a common choice for celebrities who want to chat with their fans without divulging personal access information. In 2013, the analysis from Stever and Lawson assumed that Twitter can be used to learn about parasocial interaction and the study provided a first step in that endeavor. The study included a sample of 12 entertainment media celebrities, 6 males and 6 females, all taken from 2009 to 2012 Twitter feeds.

The result showed that, although fans interacting with celebrities via Twitter have limited access to communicate with the celebrity, the relationship is still parasocial even though a fan might receive the occasional reply from the celebrity. Twitter can provide a direct connection between followers and celebrities or influencers that gives access to everyday information. It is an entertaining way for most fans since Twitter enables them to be a part of life that they enjoy.

The more followers one has on Twitter, the greater perceived social influence one has. This is particularly because tweets are broadcast to every follower, who may then retweet these posts to their own followers, which are then rebroadcast to thousands of other Twitter members. Seen as the equivalent to a movie earning a box-office hit or a single track hitting the top of the Billboard charts, the phenomenon of "trending" (i.e., words tagged at a higher rate than others on a social media platform) on Twitter grants users the ability to earn influence on the platform. Twitter, alongside other social media websites, can be utilized by its users as a form of gaining social capital.

=== Online video and livestreaming ===
Academics at the 2022 Hawaii International Conference on System Sciences referred to interactions on livestreaming services as "cyber-social relations"; they stated that these interactions "take a middle position between" social (there are no spatial proximity and no bodily contact) and parasocial relations (as there is reciprocity and temporal proximity).

==== YouTube ====
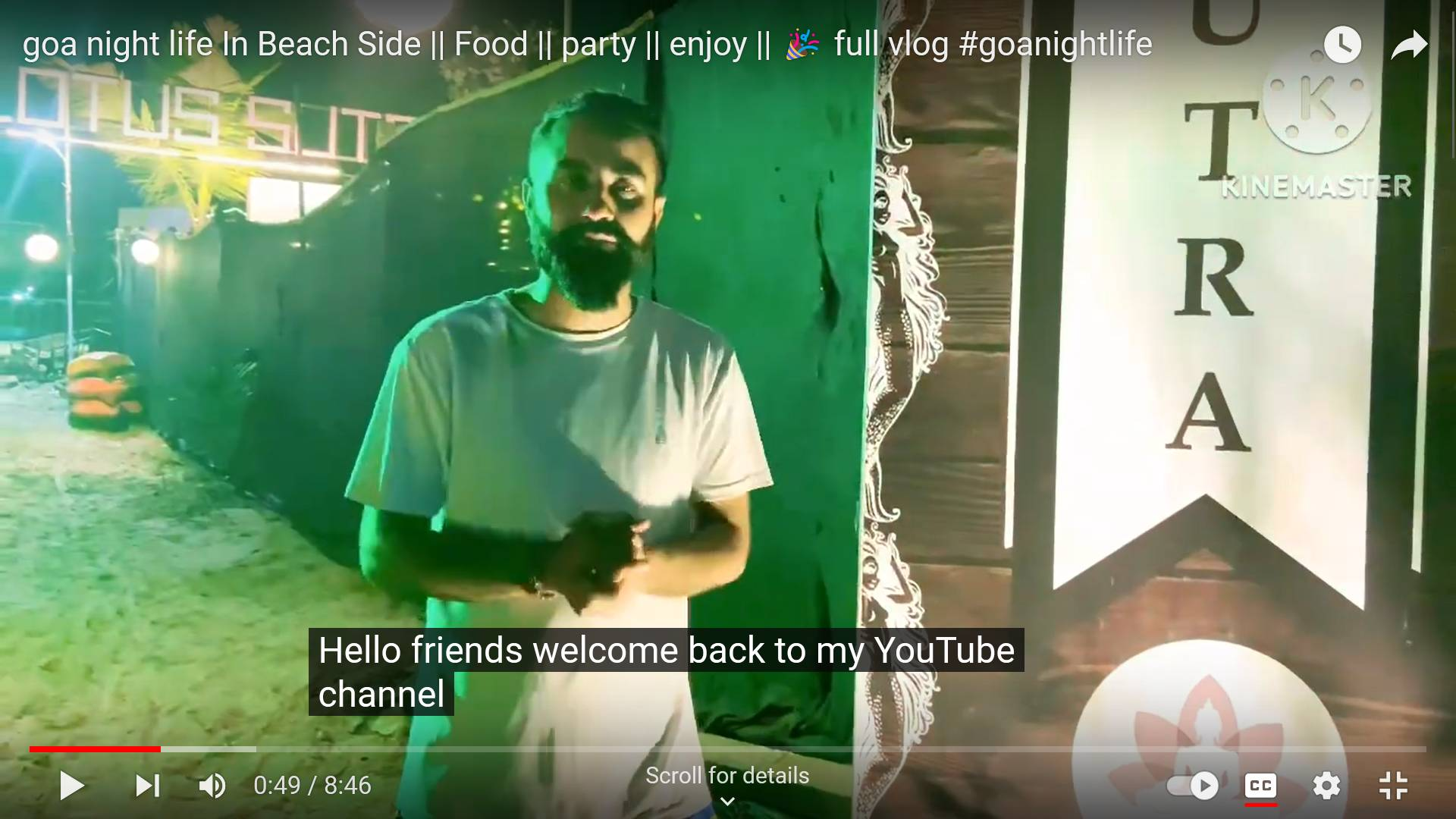
A YouTube vlogger greeting his viewers as "friends"

YouTube, a social media platform dedicated to sharing video-related content produced by its users, has grown in popularity to become a form of media that's likened to television for the current generation. By content creators granting insight into their daily lives through the practice of vlogging, viewers form close one-sided relationships with these creators that manifest in comment chains, fan art and consistent responses with the creator in question. Parasocial interaction and relationships are commonly formed between the creators and their audiences due to the creator's desire to interact with their fanbase through comments or posts. Many creators share "personal" details of their lives, even if there is little authenticity in the polished identity they convey online.

The interaction between viewers and celebrities is not limited to product placement or branding – the viewers could socialize with celebrities or influencers that they might not have any chance to contact in reality. Megan Farokhmanesh, for The Verge, wrote that parasocial relationships "are vital to YouTubers' success, and they are what turns viewers into a loyal community. ... Viewers who feel friendship or intimacy with their favorite creators can also have higher expectations and stronger reactions when those expectations are disappointed. ... Because creators often earn money off their fans through memberships, Patreons, and other cash avenues, there are fans who feel entitled to specific details about the lives of creators or even specific content. ... The divide between creators' lives and their work is a fine line".

In a study conducted by Google in 2017, a reported 40% of millennial YouTube subscribers claimed their "favorite creators understands them better than their friends". For many viewers, parasocial relationships check off the four factors that are defined by Mark Granovetter's "The Strength of Weak Ties" theory: intimacy is gained by the creator's sharing of personal details, by which their viewers may react emotionally; viewers dedicate time to watching content the creator uploads; and what the creator posts—whether sponsored or not—may make the viewer feel as if they are being offered something, like a favor.

==== Twitch ====
Twitch, a video livestreaming service with focuses such as video game live streaming, creative content, and "in real life" streams, has also grown in popularity since launching in June 2011. Twitch's platform encourages creators to directly engage with their fans. According to research, a large draw towards the website is the aspect of users directly participating in a livestream through the chat function. In turn, streamers interact with their audience by greeting them by username or addressing their messages in comments.

As noted in one study, this type of interaction forms "a sense of community". Twitch livestreams create a digital "third place", a term coined by Ray Oldenburg that describes a public and informal get-together of individuals that are foundational to building a community. This sense of community is further enhanced when users become regular participants of a stream, either by watching live shows frequently or subscribing to the creator.

Subscribing to a Twitch channel is another way in which viewers participate in a live stream. This is considered a form of digital patronage where audiences pay money to financially support a creator. Forming what an audience member perceives as a personal relationship with their favourite streamer plays a large role in whether or not they choose to subscribe.

Wired stated that Twitch pioneered "the digital parasocial thing. More specifically, monetizing it on a massive scale". David Finch, in the book Implications and Impacts of eSports on Business and Society, highlighted that streamers on Twitch have many options to monetize their content such as donations through Twitch, channel subscriptions and ad revenue; additionally, Twitch is more associated with livestreaming than YouTube and has "a much higher degree of interaction" between the content creator and the viewer. Finch wrote that "the popularity of Twitch parallels other emerging digital media forms in that it is user-generated, draws on parasocial relationships established online and establishes intimacy in new ways. ... Twitch viewers might similarly regard their time on their favourite Twitch channels as familiar, hilarious and informative encounters with their gaming pals".

Academics Time Wulf, Frank Schneider, and Stefan Beckert found that parasocial relationships are a key component to a Twitch streamer's success and the audience's enjoyment of Twitch; particularly, Twitch's chat features can foster this relationship. They highlighted that "professional streamers have a personal schedule of streaming times so that users can rely on seeing their friends again—similar to characters of a periodic TV show. Therefore, viewers are able to maintain their relationships with streamers. The stronger bonds between viewers and streamers grow, the more users may support their favorite streamer's success". The Guardian also highlighted the interactive nature of Twitch and that the "format is extremely good at cultivating a relationship among community, establishing itself as a virtual hangout spot for its millions of teenage and college-age users".

Twitch streamers have also discussed the negatives associated with these parasocial relationships such as harassment and stalking by fans. Cecilia D'Anastasio, for Kotaku, wrote that "Twitch streamers are like digital-age geisha. They host, they entertain, they listen, they respond. They perform their skill—gaming, in most cases—from behind a thick veneer of familiarity. Maybe it's because they let viewers into their homes, or because the live-streaming format feels candid or because of their unprecedented accessibility, but there's something about being an entertainer on Twitch that blurs the line between viewer and friend. It can be hard to keep a healthy distance from fans. And, for fans, it can occasionally be hard to tell the difference between entertainer and companion".

The Verge and the HuffPost have both specifically highlighted the harassment female Twitch streamers experience. Jesselyn Cook, for HuffPost, wrote that "most all women who earn a living on Twitch know what it's like to have male viewers who, after spending countless hours watching them in real time, develop obsessive feelings of romantic and sexual entitlement. The result is an environment where extreme harassment, rape and death threats, blackmailing, stalking and worse have become regular workplace hazards. Female streamers who spoke to HuffPost said they wish they'd known before joining Twitch that they were also signing up for a torrent of endless, dehumanizing harassment with little to no recourse".

=== Podcasters ===
Podcasts, episodic series of spoken-word digital audio files that a user can download to a personal device, are also known for fostering parasocial relationships between podcasters and listeners. As early as 2012, Robert C. MacDougall wrote "The podcast, and particularly the podcast listened to on the move, may be part of an evolution in parasocial phenomena and a fundamentally new part of mediated interpersonal communication. Podcasts enhance the personal feel and all attendant psychodynamic effects of Fessenden's primordial radio show."

Laith Zuraikat wrote on "The Parasocial Nature of the Podcast" in his book Radio's Second Century (2020). Author Wil Williams wrote, "there is a difference between feeling a friendship, a sense of comfort, between yourself and a podcaster, and assuming that friendship to be real. Something that makes podcasters appealing is that they have an everyman quality to them: anyone can make a podcast, and this means that in many genres, podcasters feel more "normal" than creators in other mediums. It's easy to feel like podcasters would be your friend if you ever met: it's likely the listener is of the same socioeconomic status as the podcaster, sharing not only other basic demographics as the podcaster, but also their interests, jokes, and philosophies."

In The Guardian, Rachel Aroesti wrote about how, during the lockdowns necessitated by the COVID-19 pandemic, "podcasters replaced our real friends [...] providing companionship that is increasingly difficult to distinguish from the real thing." She wrote how "Podcasts are intimate, with no in-the-room audience to remind you of your own distance."

Semantic scholar Mikhaela Nadora (Portland State University) wrote that "[Parasocial relationships] with podcast hosts may cultivate the same way real-life relationships do. As social relationships are important to us, with the new self-autonomous and personalized advances in our media and technology landscape, we can have the same intimate relationships with media figures."

== Commercial influences ==
Parasocial interaction theory has been used to understand consumers' purchasing behavior in online context. With the development of social media, such as Facebook, Twitter, Instagram, and YouTube, both companies and consumers start to use social commerce platforms more frequently. Many studies indicate that, among various factors affecting consumers' purchase decision on social commerce platforms, such as credibility of products, parasocial interaction exerts more potential influence on users' final decisions. Sokolova and Kefi conducted a study with large data set (1209 respondents) from the audiences of four popular influencers in the beauty and fashion sector in France to discover the influence of parasocial interaction and credibility on consumers' purchase intention. Their study discovers that younger generations value parasocial interaction and their personal attachment to influencers more than credibility.

On the social commerce platforms, users intend to build parasocial interaction, one with other users, one with celebrities.

=== Influencers ===
Certain social media users, called influencers, are active creators of online content, such as personal experiences, ideas, or reviews for targeted audiences. Influencers can become experts, similar to celebrities to some extent, and their posts may influence products and brands and affect potential customers, i.e. their followers. The users in a social commerce platform "meet" with other users and influencers through the images, videos, and feedbacks that they share on the social media. By the time, after multiples times of "meetings", the imaginary intimacy is improved, and the users will deliberately maintain the online friendship, which is a parasocial interaction. Influencers on the social media platforms often comment on the products they have tested, and promote them online to other users by providing their feelings and personal experiences along with images and videos.

Some brands have their Instagram influencer marketing strategies to increase followers' buying intention and trustworthiness perception. Under the parasocial relationship, users intend to rely on the images or comments that influencers had on the products, which will influence consumers' final decisions. Thus, many social commerce merchants utilize this psychological implication, and propagate beautiful images and positive comments on products to provide users a more intuitive shopping experience.

For instance, the popularity of vlogs creates a social space where strangers can share feelings and build intimate relationship. Followers of influencers would make a comparison of the tastes between themselves and the celebrities or influencers they watch, so that PSI has generated among them. Many merchants pay vloggers for recommending and persuading their subscribers to purchase the products. Vlogs provide vivid visual experience for viewers, and the audience could perceive the closeness with the vloggers that build a virtual relationship like face to face via this medium. The audience may be influenced by those vlogs and vloggers to make their purchasing decisions.

=== Celebrities ===
Parasocial relationships are more readily formed between social media users and celebrities. On social media, celebrities build and strengthen more intimate relationships with consumers and fans. Celebrities' self-disclosure could allow their fans and audience get connected with those celebrities and stimulate their illusion of in-person relationship with celebrities. Simultaneously, the context of SCPs, supported by Web 2.0 social media technologies, stimulates users' parasocial interactions with celebrities and experts. Uncertainty reduction theory is an example of a way that this can occur. The process of repeated exposure to an individual gradually reduces the user's level of uncertainty, which increases the user's chances of liking this celebrity.

On some social shopping websites, users could follow celebrities and interact with those people to generate an illusory bond between the celebrities and themselves. Repeated exposure to the celebrity gives users a sense of predictability in their actions, which engenders a sense of loyalty. Parasocial interactions help to increase more social attractions for celebrities and present greater credibility to customers.

Fans in parasocial relationships with celebrities may affirm their loyalty through various activities, including purchasing products endorsed by celebrities. Unlike influencers, celebrities bring their fans with stronger impulse purchase. Targeted consumers (fans) desire to interact with celebrities, instead of passively receiving information from celebrities. By purchasing and supporting the celebrity endorsing products, fans may build more intimate relationship with celebrities in their imagination.

In a 2014 journal article, Seung-A Annie Jin and Joe Phua discussed how they conducted studies to determine multiple hypotheses based on the number of followers a celebrity had in correlation to the trust that imparted onto a consumer. This study was done in terms of a celebrity endorsing a product and the likelihood of the consumer to purchase the product after seeing the promotion. Consumers perceived the celebrity with a high number of followers as being more physically attractive, trustworthy, and competent.

A high number of followers on the celebrity endorser's profile also significantly increased consumers' intention to build an online friendship with the celebrity. The study found that if a celebrity with a higher number of followers was perceived as more trustworthy, the consumer exhibited significantly higher postexposure product involvement and buying intention as opposed to those who were exposed to a celebrity with a lower follower count.

Merchants on social commerce platforms will find huge potentials of analyzing and applying parasocial interactions to manipulate consumers' purchase intention. In addition to influencing fans to purchase products, celebrities can also influence fans to engage in similar conversational styles. Fans, or audience members, in parasocial relationships may "appear to be accommodating to characters' linguistic styles". As fans continue to interact in a parasocial relationship, there is potential for them to mirror the conversational style of the celebrity while communicating on different platforms of social media.

==== Global fandoms ====
Unlike Western models, K-pop employs its own highly structured and corporate-based approach to mass intimacy production. K-pop artists entertain their local and global fans through various formats, including music videos, live-streaming programs, and non-music content. Access to paid content through membership creates a sense of exclusive closeness to their idols. Special applications, such as Weverse and V Live, are used by K-pop performers to connect with followers in real-time and update them through a text-simulated environment, which fosters a stronger parasocial relationship. The combination of these sites and social networks (like X/Twitter) allows fans to have direct access to celebrities, making PSRs less one-sided and more vigorous, which sustains loyalty and high popularity.

The intimate connections between K-pop fans and their idols can be referred to as "parasocial kinship" that develops the illusion of idols as an objects of familial affection and adulation. Some fans explicitly credit their idols for fostering a "zest for life" and aiding them in coping with mental health issues. However, excessive PSI can lead to unhealthy emotional attachment and distorted perceptions of interpersonal relationships and body image anxiety.

The K-pop fandom system contributes to the parasocial experience, establishes a sense of community, and strengthens PSI. Through fandom activity and communication within fan communities, parasocial interaction is perpetuated at all times. Their activities, such as collaborative projects to market their idols through streaming, viewing, or running support projects, bolster the social bond not only with the band members but also among themselves.

=== Companies ===
As social media relationships grew between celebrities and influencers, businesses created social media profiles for audience engagement. Fast food restaurants have started comedy Twitter accounts to interact with their customers in a personal way. The companies' Twitter accounts respond to tweets from customers, tell jokes and engage in the online industry in ways that create PSI with the consumers. This strategy is working.

A study done by Lauren I. Labrecque in 2013 found that customers have higher loyalty intentions and are more likely to provide information for the brand when the brand fostered PSIs. The study also showed that these outcomes were less likely when the consumer felt the response from the company's social media account were automated. Furthermore, including personal details and behind-the-scenes ideation in interactions with consumers also triggers PSI and results in a positive impact.

Another parasocial interaction usage in organizational communication is that CEOs' social media image also contributes to the company's image and reputation. Therefore, CEOs have paid attention to their communication with customers, employees, and investors. They would improve their public features through social media to communicate with the stakeholders.

In a 2023 study involving the quick serving restaurant (QSR) industry, Banerjee, Sen, and Zahay find that customers' in-store engagement in the form of their social media usage can have strong predictive power. The authors find that social media posts containing product brand mentions created by an engaged customer within a store premise can trigger parasocial interactions in the form of likes, retweets, and replies which can further lead to an increased competitive spillover. Such effects can either increase or decrease based on the competitor density in the area. Combining data from six different databases, the authors show how social media can be leveraged to influence competitive positions in local markets. In this interesting study, the authors caution that seemingly positive customer testimonials from within a store can ultimately end up helping competitor brands and hence store managers must practice diligence in monitoring customer social media posts.

=== Livestreaming ===
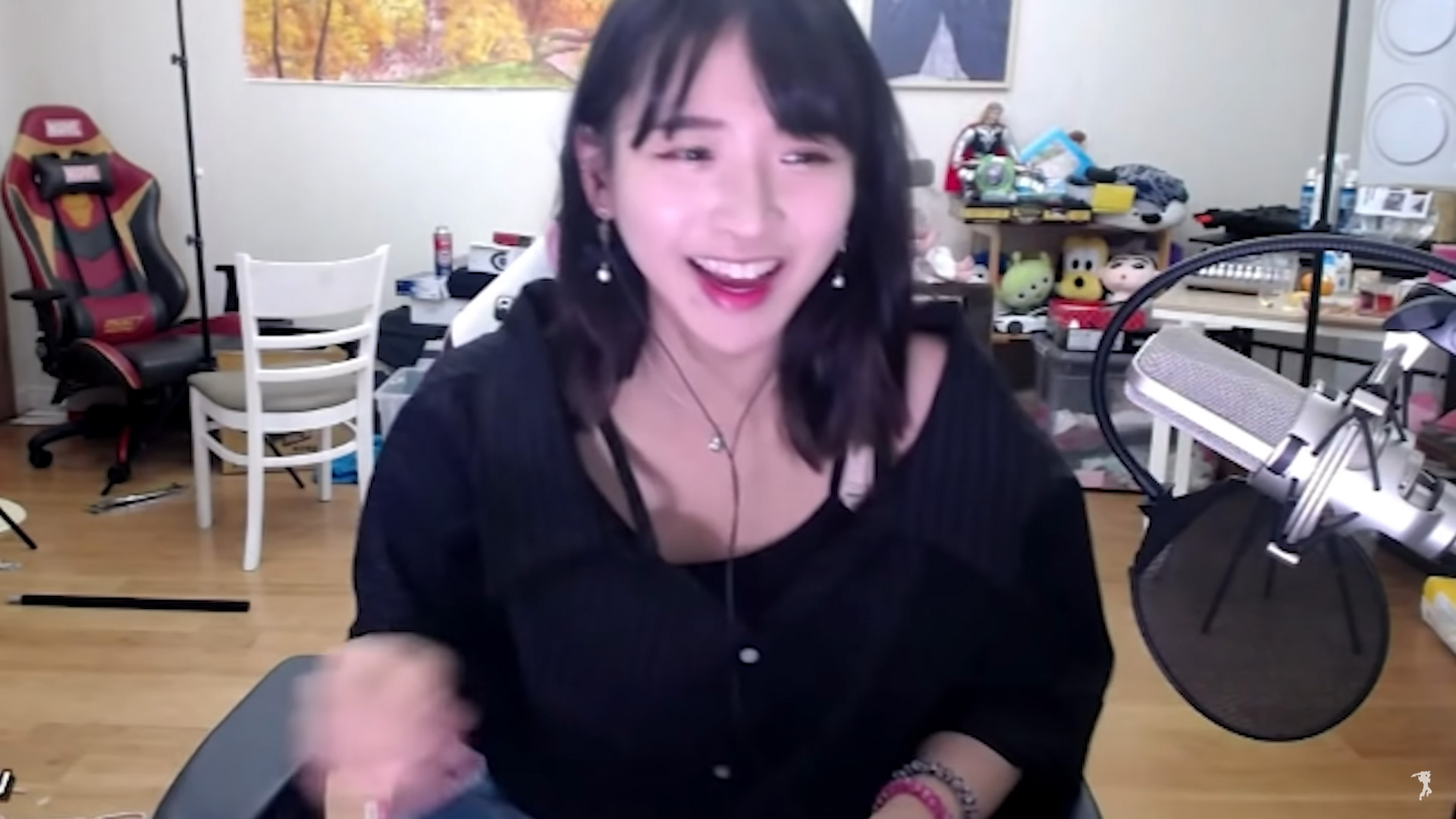
Twitch streamer Jinnytty during a live broadcast

According to Ko and Chen (2020), "Live streaming was originally used in broadcasting sporting events or news issues on TV. As the mobile Internet gets more and more popular, now the netizen and small companies can broadcast themselves via the use of live-streaming APP". Many platforms have developed and launched their live stream function, like Taobao.com and Facebook. For online retailers like Taobao.com or Tmall.com, users could follow and interact with the hosts and celebrities like being friends with them.

"China had up to 433 million live streaming viewers in August 2019 [CNNIC 2019]. The use of live streaming to promote brands and products is "exploding" in the E-commerce field in China [Aliresearch 2020]. For example, during the "June 18" event in 2019, Taobao's live streaming platform drove sales of 13 billion yuan, with the number of merchants broadcasting live streaming increasing by nearly 120% year-on-year. The number of broadcasts grew by 150% year- on-year [CNNIC 2019]."

From the perspective of a retailer, live streaming provides more opportunities for marketing, branding, improving customer services and increasing revenue. As a customer, live streaming also offers a more synchronic and interactive shopping experience than before. Interactions between streamers/sellers and consumers also help customers get higher quality information about the products, which is different from traditional shopping method.

According to Xu, Wu and Li (2020), "streaming commerce creates a novel shopping environment that provides multiple stimuli to motivate potential consumers to indulge in their shopping behaviors. It has emerged and shows great potential as a novel business model to add dynamic real-time interaction among sellers (streamers) and consumers (viewers), provide accurate information, and involve hedonic factors to attract consumers to indulge in consumption processes. Viewers are enabled to obtain dynamic and accurate information by watching live streams, develop virtual social relationships with streamers, and enjoy relaxing and entertaining hours while watching attractive streamers".

Livestreaming permits the viewers and the streamers engage in a real-time interaction, which could create a sense of intimacy and closeness. Thus, the perceived credibility and trustworthiness would be reinforced through dynamic interactions. In America, retailers like Amazon and QVC have also worked on their own live streaming shopping platforms to take advantage of this dynamic. Interpersonal relations on livestreaming services occupy a position in between social and parasocial relations, giving livestreaming a unique position in the landscape of social media.

== Limitations ==
Most studies find that PSI only occurs as friendship, which is overly restrictive theoretically and practically. People may develop parasocial interactions with media figures they do not consider to be "friends", such as a villain in a show. Though PSI with disliked figures is less likely than with heroes and positive characters, the situation of "love to hate" relationship with disliked characters still occurs. Some researchers realize the restriction of limiting PSIs to friendship, which may preclude them from capture broader situation of meaningful media user reactions.

In 2010, Tian and Hoffner conduct an online questionnaire measuring the responses from 174 participants to a liked, neutral, or disliked character from the ABC drama Lost. All participants reported the identification they had perceived with the character, as well as the parasocial interaction and how did they try to change their perspectives to be more like the character. According to the whole sample, perceived similarity was a significant positive predictor of both identification and parasocial interaction. Undeniably, parasocial interaction was higher for liked than for neutral and disliked characters based on the study. Parasocial interaction still appeared with liked, neutral and disliked characters. The prevailing perspective of PSI as a friendship is not appropriate based on the theoretical and experimental findings, and many researchers start to improve the measurement of the PSI's concept.

== Future research ==
One direction for future PSI concerns the advancement of methodology. As theories become more defined and complex, experiments seem to be necessary to be employed in testing hypotheses. Because the meanings of perception and emotion take up much of what parasocial interaction/relationship research interest, the cause and effect is hard to be distinguished and potential spuriousness is difficult to be avoided. For example, whether similarity precedes PSI and whether mediated interaction create a sense of similarity requires experimental validation.

Cohen also suggested that different types of relationships are encouraged to be analyzed within different genres, which particularly challenges scholars in examining the mediated relationship in reality TV shows (e.g., Survivor). These prototypical reality shows are built around narratives, displaying a lot of emotions which seem to solicit empathy and identification, and also demonstrating the characters' skills towards developing fandom. Ratings and audience responses provide strong evidence that those reality shows create significant mediated relationship, but future inquiries should examine whether this new kind of mediated interaction/relationship evolves or do these interactions/relationships conform to existing patterns.

The influence of media in childhood has received little attention from developmental psychologists, even though children have a high degree of exposure to media. While many studies and experiments have explored the nature of parasocial relationships, there are many opportunities for future research. For example, a potential future area of research could be the issue of reruns, where the relationships have outcomes which are already known or well-established. In addition, another area of research could focus on production techniques or televisual approaches. This would include techniques such as chiaroscuro or flat lighting, the strategic placement of close-ups or establishing shots, deductive or inductive shot sequences, hip hop editing, or desaturation. These techniques have long been theorized to have some sort of influence on the formation of parasocial relationships, but their influence has yet to be determined.

The prevailing use of social media and its impact on mediated relationships also requires further study of PSI. Different social media platforms provide channels through which celebrities communicate with their followers easily, making parasocial interaction/relationships seem less unidirectional and perhaps more satisfying and intense. As such, whether social media has made PSI more a part of everyday life needs further exploration. Technological development has been raising questions regarding the role of PSI in our social lives, as media content is available in more places and times. Our mediated friends are never too far away; instead, they actually rest in our pockets and sleep in our beds. Whether this means that we spend more time and effort on cultivating these relationships and will be less dependent on real social relationships, needs further exploration.

While parasocial relationships are typically seen as a relationship with a media persona whom the individual views positively, more research should be done surround parasocial relationships with media personas who the individual views in a negative sense. There are many instances on social media where negative interactions exist (negative sentiments expressed towards politicians, athletes, etc.). It would be interesting to understand how these negative interactions and relationships can affect us, and our other relationships. Additionally, more research should be done on the well-being consequences of parasocial relationships with media persona who may inspire hate or other negative emotions, such as towards a particular group of people.

The role that mediated communication and engagement played during the pandemic may have led to media personas being evaluated with similar (or the same) cognitive processes we use when interacting with real-life friends. This may continue to influence our parasocial relationships, and more should be learned regarding the long-term effects of COVID-19 on the functioning of parasocial relationships.

Other concerns include the continuity of media figures representation across various media outlets, and the notion of parasocial interaction as compensation for lack of social outlets. Popstars, for example, may not only appear on television, but on several different television or radio programs, as either a chat guest or a performer; further repeated viewings of these stars would intensify visual aspects of parasocial interaction with that star. Most research has typically characterized media users as a television viewer who is often solitary and in need of social interaction. The different types of user-figure interaction can be addressed by conceptualizing parasocial interaction as an extension of ordinary social interaction. Through close examination of social encounters that are significant for parasocial relationships, we can continue to distinguish between parasocial interaction as an isolated activity and as longer-term interaction.

== Focus on relationships ==
=== Background ===
The terms parasocial interactions and parasocial relationships were coined by anthropologist Donald Horton and sociologist R. Richard Wohl in 1956, laying the foundation for the topic within the field of communication studies. Originating from psychology, parasocial phenomena comes from a wide range of scientific backgrounds and methodological approaches. The study of parasocial relationships has increased with the growth of mass and social media such as Facebook, Twitter, and Instagram, particularly by those investigating advertising effectiveness and journalism. Horton and Wohl have stated that television personas offer the media user a sense of intimacy and have influence over them by using their appearance and gesture in a way that is seen as being engaging, directly addressing the audience, and conversing with them in a friendly and personal manner. By viewing media personas regularly and feeling a sense of trust with the persona, parasocial relationships offer the media user a continuous relationship that intensifies.

=== Celebrity endorsements and advertising ===
Advertising and marketing can use media personas to increase brand awareness, keep media users engaged, and increase purchase intention by seeking out attractive media personas. If media personas show that they are interested in and engage in rewarding interactions with media users, then if the media user likes the persona they will reciprocate interactions and over time form a parasocial relationship with them.

In this social media era, media users are able to have interactions with the media persona that are more intimate, open, reciprocal, and frequent. More media personas are using social media platforms for personal communication, revealing their personal lives and thoughts to consumers. The more frequent and conversational that the media persona self discloses via social media results in media users feeling high levels of intimacy, loyalty, and friendship. Media users know that the chances of receiving a direct message or getting a retweet from a celebrity are highly unlikely, but the possibility gives fans a sense of intimacy and adds authenticity to one-sided parasocial relationships with their favorite personas.

Celebrity endorsements are so effective with purchase intention because parasocial relationships form such an influential bond of trust. The acceptance and trustworthiness that the media user feels towards the media persona is carried over into the brand that is being promoted. Media users feel that they understand media personas and appreciate their values and motives. This accumulation of time and knowledge acquired of the media persona translates into feelings of loyalty, which can then influence their attitudes, voting decisions, prejudices, change their ideas about reality, willingness to donate, and purchasing advertised products. Celebrities and popular social media personalities who engage in social media endorsements are referred to as influencers.

=== Politics ===
Through parasocial relationships, politicians seeking to hold office may utilize these relationships to appeal to their voting base and any potential new voters. With the rise of social media being used during campaigns, these politicians now have the opportunity to engage in more personal types of communication with voters. These parasocial interactions between voters and candidates can also be vital in predicting particular political support in various national elections. Voters are starting to feel more connected to candidates who at a glance appear to understand their hardships. When looking at someone like then-candidate Donald Trump in 2016, there was a study that showed those who had already formed parasocial bonds with Trump from his reality TV career were more likely to support him for president than those that did not. Trump was able to make himself appear more authentic which increased the number of parasocial relationships formed by his voters. However, the tendency to form parasocial relationships was not designated to just one party. Both the Democratic and Republican parties attempt to connect with fans on a more personal basis during election periods. As a result, all high-profile politicians regardless of their party may be subject to parasocial relationships from their voters and supporters.

=== Causes and impact ===
Parasocial relationships are a psychological attachment in which the media persona offers a continuing relationship with the media user. They grow to depend on them, plan to interact with them, count on them much like a close friend. They acquire a history with them and believe they know the persona better than others. Media users are free to partake in the benefits of real relations with no responsibility or effort. They can control their experience or walk away from parasocial relationships freely.

A media user's bond with media personas can lead to higher self-confidence, a stronger perception of problem focused coping strategies, and a stronger sense of belonging. However these one-sided relationships can also foster an impractical body image, can reduce self-esteem, increase media consumption, and media addiction.

Parasocial relationships are seen frequently with post-retirement aged media users due to high television consumption and loss of social contacts or activities. However, adolescents are also prone to form parasocial relationships. This is attributed to puberty, the discovery of sexuality and identity, and the idolization of media stars. Women are generally more likely to form stronger parasocial relationships than men.

Some results indicate that parasocial relationships with media personas increase because the media user is lonely, dissatisfied, emotionally unstable, and/or has unattractive relationship alternatives. Some can use these parasocial relationships as a substitute for real social contact. A media user's personality affects how they use social media and may also vary an individual's pursuit of intimacy and approach to relationships i.e. extroverts may prefer to seek social gratification through face-to-face interactions as opposed to mediated ones.

Media users use mediated communication to gratify their personal needs, such as to relax, seek pleasure, boredom, or out of habit. In this era of social media and the internet media users have constant access to on demand viewing, constant interactions on hand held mobile devices, and widespread Internet access.

=== Parasocial breakups ===
Experiencing negative emotional responses as a result of an ending parasocial relationship, i.e. death of a television persona in a series, is known as a parasocial breakup. Eyal and Cohen, who examined responses to the end of the television series Friends, define a parasocial breakup as "a situation where a character with whom a viewer has developed a PSR goes off the air".

The distress that media consumers experienced after a parasocial breakup was quite similar to that of a social relationship. However, the emotional distress experienced after the parasocial breakup was weaker than that of the real life interpersonal relationship. The in-person/real life social relationship status of an individual does not affect the intensity of distress or discomfort felt in parasocial breakups. Age, however, shows correlation with the intensity of distress at parasocial breakups, as Cohen finds young people (under the age of 20) are more susceptible to strong symptoms of PSB (Parasocial breakup). For some people, parasocial breakups can be as simple as avoiding the content concerning the subject of the parasocial tie. According to Cohen, the level of distress to the individuals experiencing parasocial breakup depends on the strength and extremity of the bond. More intense levels of parasocial breakup could be predicted by loneliness and observing media for companionship.

Lather and Moyer-Guse also considered the concept of parasocial breakup, but in a more temporary sense. While the study focused on parasocial breakups as a result of the writers' strike from 2007 to 2008, the researchers found that media consumers still experienced different levels of emotional distress. This study, like previous studies, showed that parasocial relationships operate very similarly to real-life relationships.

Gerace examined fans' reactions to the end of the long-running Australian television series Neighbours. Fans reported feelings of considerable grief and perceptions of a parasocial breakup with their favorite character. Fans who formed stronger parasocial relationships with their favorite character, self-identified strongly as a fan of the series, and viewed the series for motives such as entertainment and exposure to different lifestyles reported greater grief and distress at the end of the series. In this study, parasocial bonding with a favorite character involved empathizing with their on-screen experiences and imagining what they were thinking and feeling.

Jonathan Cohen, from the Department of Communications in University of Haifa, links parasocial relationships and breakups to social relationship attachment styles. The results and lasting effects of a parasocial breakup may rely on the attachment styles of the person experiencing and initiating the attachment, much like social relationships. Individuals with an anxious attachment style experience more extreme reactions to parasocial breakups, compared to avoidant and secure types.

=== With fictional characters ===
Parasocial relationships with fictional characters are more intense than with nonfictional characters, because of the feeling of being completely present in a fictional world. Narrative realism—the plausibility that a fictional world and its characters could exist—and external realism—the level at which aspects of the story map to a person's real world experiences—play a part in heightening one's connections to fictional characters. If a narrative can convince a viewer that a character is plausible and/or relatable, it creates a space for the viewer to form a parasocial relationship with said character. There is a desire for camaraderie that can be built through bonding over a fictional persona.

Due to the span and breadth of media franchises such as the Harry Potter, Disney, and Star Wars series, consumers are able to engage more deeply and form strong parasocial relationships. These fictional parasocial relationships can extend further than watching the movies or reading the books into official and fan fiction websites, social media, and even extend beyond media to have an in-person experience at national and international theme park attractions.

For individuals who become very attached to fictional characters, and may or may not depend on them emotionally, even the thought of that character being removed from the story in some way (death, being written out of the story, etc.) can be extremely painful.

The dread of a fictional character's death (the parasocial breakup) can be much stronger than that of a parasocial breakup with a public figure.

Parasocial relationships with fictional characters may be affected by external events relating to the actors who play them, and vice versa. For example, if a scandal were to occur with an actor, individuals who had parasocial connections to the character they played may reevaluate their opinions on the character. A parasocial breakup may occur with the fictional character, as a result of the scandal. However, the reverse, where a positive impression of an actor due to an event is created, does not apply. Fictional characters, in this case, are seen as separate from the actor and their good contributions or personality outside of the role.

==== My Little Pony: Friendship Is Magic fandom ====
In a 2018 study of thousands of bronies (the "Brony Study Project"), clinical psychologist Patrick Edwards and his research colleagues examined preferences of the Mane Six—the main pony characters of My Little Pony: Friendship Is Magic—and their psychological and parasocial relationships with fans of the series (commonly known as bronies). They found that fans of different characters exhibited distinct psychological profiles that often mirrored their chosen character's canonical personality traits, with characters serving various parasocial functions from aspirational role models to sources of emotional support. Edwards's study showed correlations between character preference and traits like creativity, social anxiety, community engagement, and psychological well-being.

Tulpas—autonomous mental companions created through sustained imaginative practice—are used by some bronies to create deeper and more interactive parasocial relationships with their favorite characters. Tulpa communities gained popularity when bronies started discussing tulpas of characters from Friendship Is Magic, with the fans using meditation and lucid dreaming techniques to create imaginary friends. According to Samuel Veissière, tulpamancers believe a tulpa is a "real or somewhat-real person".

A 2022 study by Erica C. Rarity, Matthew R. Leitao, and Abraham M. Rutchick examined the psychological relationship between the brony fandom and the Mane Six. According to the authors, the brony fandom serves as an exemplary case study for parasocial relationships due to its long-running nature, robust community interactions, and clearly defined personalities of the Mane Six. The researchers surveyed 829 bronies to determine whether identification with specific characters correlated with participants exhibiting the personality traits those characters canonically embody. Most of the Mane Six demonstrated strong correlations between character identification and corresponding personality traits.

=== Parasocial romantic fantasy ===
==== Reciprocation ====
The traditional definition of a parasocial relationship emphasizes that it is one-sided and cannot be reciprocated by performers, meaning that fans solely construct this imagined relationship. With the rise of K-pop, it has become a cultural force across many social aspects beyond music itself. Idol groups debut and build various types of fan communities to attract audiences worldwide. Their success does not rely only on fans individually constructing parasocial relationships. Instead, agencies and idols actively create what can be described as a "reciprocated" process. For example, idols open accounts on fan platforms to send exclusive messages and host live-stream sessions that give fans a sense of intimacy. Fans who are deeply attached to their favorite idols or groups may be more prone to a phenomenon called parasocial romantic fantasy.

==== Internal motivation ====
One of the main pleasures in parasocial romantic fantasy is the opportunity to experience a better version of oneself. These fantasies not only encourage people to imagine a perfect partner but also to construct an ideal version of themselves. When fans immerse themselves in romantic fantasies with their idols, they may follow their inner desires and shape the personality they prefer in that imagined relationship. Fans often project their expectations of an ideal partner onto the idol, imagining the idol as more caring, more serious, or possessing other desired traits. This desire for a specific type of partner encourages fans to become deeply involved in such fantasies. In addition, imagining a better version of oneself can bring significant pleasure. Some fans may feel dissatisfied with their real-life personality; through fantasy, they can construct a "perfect" self and interact with a "perfect" partner. From an escapism perspective, some fans engage in these fantasies to escape stressful circumstances in real life. Immersing themselves in fantasies with a desired partner becomes a way to temporarily distance themselves from real-world concerns and pressures.

==== External motivation ====
The training system, long-term contracts with entertainment companies, and limitations on personal freedom closely resemble the practices Hollywood employed in the 1940s, known as the star system. Under this system, celebrities signed contracts with studios and were deeply controlled and restricted by the terms in those contracts. In many ways, what K-pop does today can be seen as a projection of this earlier system of control. K-pop entertainment companies often shape idols into seemingly "perfect" commodities to maximize revenue. They carefully construct each idol's personality so that it can fulfill different fans' expectations. South Korean entertainment companies actively train idols not only in performance skills but also in building and maintaining a sense of closeness with fans. At the same time, they guide fans to immerse themselves in the illusion of forming an intimate relationship with their idols. The structured training systems of entertainment companies are therefore a major contributor to the formation of this fan community, especially among deeply engaged fans who develop parasocial romantic fantasies.

==== Positive impacts ====
Social interaction is necessary for human beings, but not everyone can fully acquire it in real life. One way to fill this gap is through what can be called "media interaction". Fans can meet their social needs by engaging in romantic fantasies about their idols, which may reduce their loneliness to some extent. Romantic fantasy can function as an extension of real social interaction and can also affirm a sense of group belonging. In real life, relationships are often unstable because they involve many uncertainties and risks. In parasocial romantic fantasy, however, social pressure is greatly reduced, since most interactions between fans and idols occur online. When idols behave within certain boundaries — acting in ways that meet fans' expectations — fans can easily gain a sense of belonging and satisfaction from these virtual interactions. In addition, some fans have stated that idols have guided them toward discovering clearer career paths and life goals. Through their engagement with idols, fans may better understand their own interests and clarify what they want to pursue in the future. Many highly loyal fans devote significant time to fan-related activities or even seek careers in the entertainment industry, demonstrating the powerful influence that idols can have on their fans.

==== Negative impacts ====
This phenomenon cultivates competitive consciousness. Fans are encouraged to support their idols through activities such as voting, purchasing albums, and making fan calls, which directly increase visibility. This dynamic fosters intense competition among fan communities. When fans place themselves in a highly important position in their idols' lives, they feel responsible for protecting their idols' reputation and demonstrating how superior their idols are compared to others. For example, conflicts may arise among fans over issues such as screen time distribution. Fans may feel proud and honored when their idols receive more screen time but may become defensive or aggressive when their idols receive less attention. This dynamic can contribute to harsh arguments, hate speech, and cyberbullying. Furthermore, excessive focus on idols' personal lives and deeply imagined intimate relationships can escalate into pathological and uncontrollable situations. Some fans may develop a strong aversion to real life, choosing to avoid it or feeling depressed when facing real-world challenges. This imbalance between the virtual fantasy world and reality can increase the risk of mental health issues.

=== Theoretical connections and measurement instruments ===
Rubin analyzed the process of parasocial relationship development by applying principles of uncertainty reduction theory, which states that uncertainty about others is reduced over time through communication, allowing for increased attraction and relationship growth. Other theories that apply to parasocial relationships are social penetration theory, which is based on the premise that positive, intimate interactions produce further rewards in the relationship and the uses and gratifications theory, which states that media users are goal driven and want media to gratify their needs.

In 1956, T.M. Newcomb's (1956) reinforcement theory explained that following a rewarding interaction an attraction is formed. A gratifying relationship is formed as a result of social attraction and interactive environments created by the media persona.

The most used measurement instrument for parasocial phenomena is the Parasocial Interaction Scale (PSI Scale), which was developed by Rubin, Perse, and Powell in 1985 to assess interpersonal relationships with media personalities.

Mina Tsay and Brianna Bodine developed a revised version of Rubin's scale by addressing that parasocial relationship engagement is dictated by a media users personality and motivations. They identified four distinct dimensions that address engagement with media personas from affective, cognitive, and behavioral perspectives. The dimensions assessed how people see media personas as role models, how people desire to communicate with them and learn more about them, and how familiar they are to the individuals. Tsay and Bodine noticed how greater levels of interaction can be formed between the media user and the media persona because of the shift of media and mass communication in recent years. Media users are now able to choose how they want to interact with and initiate in their own media experiences online, such as fan groups, Twitter, and character blogs.

== During the COVID-19 pandemic ==
Parasocial relationships have been studied in various contexts, but the COVID-19 pandemic created a unique environment in which to study them. Due to the global pandemic, people's social routines were abruptly interrupted; with the beginning of social-distancing and isolation protocols, people forcibly experienced a decrease in their face-to-face (FtF) interactions. To maintain communication with others, people turned to screens and media such as Zoom and FaceTime ("mediated" communication). This shift to mediated communication "blurred" the differences that existed between social and parasocial interactions and relationships. People would interact with their friends in similar ways as they would with media personas who they had parasocial relationships with. For example, one could like and comment on someone's Instagram posts in the same way in both scenarios.

This environment presented a unique environment to study the parasocial compensation hypothesis, which suggests that parasocial relationships can function as an alternative to typical social relationships.

=== Findings ===
One study found that individuals in a certain identity domain who lacked friends in real life made up for this deficiency by forming intense parasocial relationships (Bond, 2018), supporting this hypothesis. During the pandemic, studies found that parasocial relationships strengthened during the social distancing phase of COVID-19, further demonstrating how parasocial relationships may in fact have a compensation function.

The individuals who reported the strongest growth in their parasocial relationships were those who decreased their face-to-face social interactions; this supports the parasocial compensation hypothesis. However, these weren't the only individuals who experienced an increase in strength in their parasocial relationships. Those who increased their use of mediated communication to communicate with friends also demonstrated growth. Overall, there was a strengthening of parasocial relationships during the beginning phases of the pandemic.

=== Explaining increases in growth ===
One potential explanation for the growth in parasocial relationships is the cognitive distinctions between social and parasocial interactions which were no longer as well-defined. There were likely greater similarities in processing the social engagement of friends and media persona. When the only way to interact with others is through a screen, social engagement becomes much more similar to parasocial engagement. When utilizing these mediated communications, users can perceive greater distance (as compared to real-life interactions), leading them to cognitively process their actual friends in a similar manner as liked media persona. This could lead to processing parasocial interactions with greater intention, which could develop into greater and stronger parasocial relationships.

Overall, parasocial relationships with media personae grew during the global pandemic, especially for those who may have used these types of interactions to make up for the "social deficiencies" that were caused by COVID-19.

== See also ==
- Audience capture – Online influencer phenomenon.
- Celebrity worship syndrome – Disorder involving obsession with celebrities
- Contact hypothesis – Psychological hypothesis about intergroup contact
- Cult of personality – Idolization of a leader
- Dōtan kyohi – Concept in otaku culture
- Parasocial contact hypothesis – Influential theory in psychology and media
- Personal god – Deity who can be related to as a person
- Sasaeng fan – Obsessive fan of Korean idols
- Simp – Slang for sycophancy
- "Stan" – 2000 single by Eminem about a fictional fan who is obsessed with the rapper.
  - Stan Twitter – online community of Twitter users named after the Eminem song.
- "Turn It On Again" – 1980 single by Genesis about a man who perceives the people he sees on his television as friends.
- Uses and gratifications theory – Theory stating that audiences have power over their media consumption
- Waifu – Fictional character that one feels attraction to
