= Richard Wohl =

American sociologist (1921–1957)

Richard Wohl (1921 – November 15, 1957) was an American sociologist who, together with Donald Horton, coined the term parasocial interactions. They introduced the term in their influential 1956 paper, where they defined it as a sense of friendship or relationship that viewers form with media personae. He died of cancer in 1957.
