= Rosemarie Truglio =

- Occupation: Television executive
- Known for: Sesame Workshop

Dr. Rosemarie Truglio is the senior vice president of education and research for Children's Television Workshop (now known as Sesame Workshop), the organization that produces Sesame Street.

In 2001, she co-edited G is for Growing, a collection of research studies on Sesame Street's effectiveness as an educational show.

== Career ==
Truglio is former assistant professor of communication and education at Teachers College, Columbia University.

In her tenure with Sesame Street, Truglio assesses the role of television in the socialization and education of children. She helps ensure that the material is presented on the show in a safe, sensitive, responsible and age-appropriate manner.

Truglio serves on the advisory board of the Children's Digital Media Center, Alliance for a Media Literate America, and The Council on Excellence in Children's Media at Annenberg School of Communication.

Truglio has appeared on talk shows such as The Today Show on behalf of Sesame Workshop. She can also be seen providing an introduction to the Sesame Beginnings video series with her son Lucas. Truglio was born in Hoboken New Jersey.

== Literary career ==
Truglio is a published author on child development topics whose articles have appeared in child and developmental psychology journals. In 2001, she co-edited G is for Growing: 30 Years of Research on Sesame Street and Children with Sholly Fisch.
