= Donald Horton =

American anthropologist, sociologist, and communication researcher

- Born: 1910
- Died: 2004 (aged 93–94)
- Education: University of Pennsylvania (BA); Yale University (PhD)
- Known for: Co-developing the concept of parasocial interaction
- Scientific career
- Fields: Anthropology, sociology, communication studies
- Workplaces: CBS; University of Chicago; Bank Street College of Education

Donald Horton was an American anthropologist, sociologist, and communication researcher. He is best known for co-authoring the 1956 article "Mass Communication and Para-Social Interaction: Observations on Intimacy at a Distance" with sociologist R. Richard Wohl. The article introduced the concept of parasocial interaction, describing the apparent face-to-face relationship that audiences may experience with performers and personalities presented through mass media.

Horton's work encompassed cross-cultural anthropology, military psychology, television audience research, the sociology of popular culture, and educational research. His research career included positions at CBS, the University of Chicago, and Bank Street College of Education.

== Education ==
Horton received a bachelor's degree from the University of Pennsylvania in 1935. After graduating he was hired as project head of the ceramics research lab for the University of Pennsylvania Museum where he contributed new developments in the technical studies of archaeological pottery. Horton later earned a doctorate in anthropology from Yale University in 1943 and began teaching anthropology classes as a visiting lecturer at Columbia University.

== Career ==
=== Anthropological and wartime research ===
In 1943, Horton published "The Functions of Alcohol in Primitive Societies: A Cross-Cultural Study" in the Quarterly Journal of Studies on Alcohol. The study compared drinking customs in a large number of societies and examined the relationship between alcohol consumption, anxiety, aggression, and subsistence conditions.

During the same period, Horton worked with psychologist John Dollard at Yale's Institute of Human Relations. Their study Fear in Battle examined fear, morale, and behavior under combat conditions using interviews with approximately 300 veterans of the Abraham Lincoln Brigade.

Horton also wrote an ethnographic overview of the Mundurucu people of Brazil for the 1948 volume Handbook of South American Indians.

=== CBS and television audience research ===
From approximately 1944 until 1947, Horton headed the CBS Television Audience Research Institute. A contemporary television-industry publication reported that he had directed the institute for three years before resigning in 1947 to accept a research fellowship at the University of Chicago. The fellowship involved a three-year study of television as a new instrument of communication in American society.

Horton's experience in commercial audience research influenced his later interest in the relationships created between media performers and their audiences.

=== University of Chicago ===
Horton subsequently became associated with the Department of Sociology at the University of Chicago. His research there addressed mass communication, popular culture, and the organization of social interaction. During this time he served on the doctoral committee for sociologist Erving Goffman.

In 1956, Horton and R. Richard Wohl published "Mass Communication and Para-Social Interaction". They argued that radio and television could produce an illusion of direct, reciprocal contact between an audience member and a media performer. They called the performer's constructed public identity a persona and described the resulting apparent relationship as para-social interaction.

The article examined techniques such as direct address, conversational presentation, recurring appearances, and subjective camera work. According to Horton and Wohl, these techniques encouraged viewers to experience media personalities as familiar social acquaintances even though the relationship remained largely one-sided.

In 1957, Horton published "The Dialogue of Courtship in Popular Songs", analyzing the language of romantic relationships in American popular music.

That year, he and sociologist Anselm Strauss published "Interaction in Audience-Participation Shows". The article treated television audience-participation programs as organized systems involving personal, parasocial, and vicarious forms of interaction between performers, studio participants, and home audiences.

=== Academic-freedom controversy ===
Horton was affected by anti-communist investigations directed at members of the University of Chicago faculty during the early Cold War. Sociologist Gary D. Jaworski had written that Horton and fellow Chicago sociologist Ernest Burgess resisted both the accusations directed against them and the authority of government commissions to investigate their political beliefs and associations. University archives contain files concerning Horton's academic-freedom case dating from 1947 to 1953.

=== Bank Street College of Education ===
By the 1960s, Horton was working in the Research Division of Bank Street College of Education in New York. He served as associate director of the college's Head Start Evaluation and Research Center.

Horton was the principal investigator of a study examining the social organization of Head Start centers. The research considered organizational tensions between professional and paraprofessional workers, parental participation, and efforts to organize parents for collective action.

He also contributed research on the relationship between schools and their surrounding communities, including a study entitled "The Interplay of Forces in the Development of a Small School System".

== Parasocial-interaction theory ==
Horton and Wohl's concept of parasocial interaction became influential in media psychology and communication studies. Later scholars applied it to relationships involving television presenters, actors, fictional characters, athletes, musicians, celebrities, and online content creators.

Subsequent research has often distinguished between a parasocial interaction, understood as the temporary experience of apparent interaction during media consumption, and a parasocial relationship, understood as an enduring sense of attachment that may continue between individual media encounters.

== Selected publications ==
- Horton, Donald (1943). "The Functions of Alcohol in Primitive Societies: A Cross-Cultural Study". Quarterly Journal of Studies on Alcohol. 4 (2): 199–320. doi:10.15288/qjsa.1943.4.199.
- Dollard, John; Horton, Donald (1943). Fear in Battle. New Haven, Connecticut: Institute of Human Relations, Yale University.
- Horton, Donald (1948). "The Mundurucu". In Steward, Julian H. (ed.). Handbook of South American Indians. Vol. 3. Washington, D.C.: United States Government Printing Office. pp. 271–282.
- Horton, Donald; Wohl, R. Richard (1956). "Mass Communication and Para-Social Interaction: Observations on Intimacy at a Distance". Psychiatry. 19 (3): 215–229. doi:10.1080/00332747.1956.11023049.
- Horton, Donald (1957). "The Dialogue of Courtship in Popular Songs". American Journal of Sociology. 62 (6): 569–578. doi:10.1086/222105.
- Horton, Donald; Strauss, Anselm (1957). "Interaction in Audience-Participation Shows". American Journal of Sociology. 62 (6): 579–587. doi:10.1086/222106.
- Horton, Donald (1967). Studies of the Social Organization of Head Start Centers (Report). New York: Bank Street College of Education. ERIC ED021612.

== See also ==
- Parasocial interaction
- Media psychology
- Celebrity culture
- Chicago school of sociology
- Mass communication
